= Lee rifle =

Lee rifle may refer to:

- Several different caliber .50 rifled breechloaders, made in the early 1870s by James Paris Lee, tested by the U.S. Ordnance Board in 1872-73 and designated Lee No. 53, 54, 61 respectively;

- Lee No. 53 bolt-action, concealed lock, weighing 2 lbs 7 oz.
- Lee No. 54 breech-block, weighing 2 lbs 13 oz.
- Lee No. 61 breech-block, weighing 2 lbs 11 oz.

- The Lee rifle prototype, built in 1878 by Scottish-Canadian brothers John Lee and James Paris Lee;
- The M1885 Remington–Lee rifle (in service in different armies, especially in the U.S. Navy, from 1879 to 1907);
- The M1895 Lee Navy rifle (in service in the U.S. Navy and the U.S. Marine Corps from 1895 to 1907);
- The Lee–Metford rifle (in service in the British Army as of 1888);
- The Lee–Enfield rifle (in service in the British Army as of 1895).
