= Eastern Military Academy =

Location
- Cold Spring Harbor, New York
- Coordinates: 40°49′44″N 73°26′54″W

Information
- Type: Military school
- Motto: "Your doorway to college"
- Opened: 1944
- Closed: 1979

Eastern Military Academy (EMA) was a high school military academy founded in 1944 in Connecticut, United States, by Roland R. Robinson, a former mathematics teacher at Peekskill Military Academy (now also defunct), and his brother-in-law, Carleton Witham. The relationship with the local town was poor from the start, and in 1948 the school moved to Cold Spring Hills on Long Island, New York, until the school closed in 1979.

== History ==
At its new location, the school was based in one of the largest mansions ever constructed in the United States, Oheka Castle, built by Otto Kahn, a multimillionaire. Following Kahn's death in 1934, his heirs had little interest in the estate, and the town of Huntington briefly used it as a retirement home for municipal employees.

EMA was organized for most of its existence as a battalion, with a band company, troop (using horses stabled a few miles away), two infantry companies of high school and junior high school students, a company of children sixth grade and below, a company of day students, i.e. students who did not board in the school, battalion staff of two to four members, and a four-member color guard. For several years of very high enrollment, the school organized as a regiment.

Robinson and Witham died within six weeks of one another in the summer of 1968, leaving the school in the hands of Alice Robinson, who was Robinson's widow and Witham's sister. According to an article in Newsday on September 30, 1968, she was then the first woman ever to head a military academy in the USA. In 1970 she sold the school to three investors, without notifying the longtime dean and new Headmaster, Leopold Hedbavny, or alumni. These investors immediately took out a three million dollar bank mortgage, although they had paid Mrs. Robinson only $50,000 plus stock in their new corporation, and stock in several other of the ultimately nine schools they bought. All nine schools were eventually closed following the taking out of large mortgages.

In 1955 the Army granted EMA status as an honor Junior ROTC unit. From 1951 to 1968 students ninth grade and up were taken to a military training base, Camp Smith, for a week in May for riflery training and practice. This continued at a base in New Jersey until 1975, the same year the school lost its honor rating. In 1977 the Army struck it from the rolls of recognized Junior ROTC units, and removed all military supplied equipment, mostly M-1 Garand rifles (prior to 1955 cadets used Springfield M1903 rifles). In 1979, enrollment was down to just ninety from a high of over 350. The school closed in 1979 after a fire had been set in the dormitory floors.

In the late 1960s, as the school was declining, two groups of disgruntled staff broke away and founded the General Douglas MacArthur Military Academy and the Marine Military Academy.

For a few years EMA had an armored unit based on some surplus Armored Personnel Carriers. Operating these when gasoline prices began rising became prohibitively expensive, and two were given to the New York City police department. One was allegedly buried on the school grounds. At the funeral of President John F. Kennedy the riderless horse following Kennedy's caisson bore a saber from EMA which had been presented to the White House by the senior class of 1962 on their class visit to Washington. EMA's sabers were engraved with a unique, copyrighted design.

== Extra-curricular ==
The school newspaper was called The Guidon. The yearbook was The Saber. The honor society (based on academic grades, military rank, being a class officer, and participation in sports and clubs) was the Order of the Key. At various points the school had a chess club, camera club, glee club, chorus, ham radio, equestrian, swimming, riflery, fencing, basketball, baseball, varsity and junior varsity football teams. EMA also hosted one of the first chapters of the Lions Club to be based in a school.

== Uniforms ==
Uniforms worn by cadets followed the style of the United States Military Academy at West Point. Shoes were black, and loafers were not permitted. Socks had to be black (medical exceptions allowed). The "uniform of the day" for all cadets included gray pants with a black stripe on each leg. The belt was black with a brass buckle that had to be kept polished. A gray long-sleeved shirt had a shield shaped patch on the right shoulder. This was the emblem of EMA, an open book atop a vertical saber, hilt down. The collars had indicia of which company each cadet was attached to, a harp for the band, cross sabers for the troop, and crossed rifles for all others. Officers had "pips" to indicate rank on the right collar, one circular pip for second lieutenant, two for first lieutenant, and three for captains. The cadet major had a single diamond shaped pip. A black tie completed the ensemble. It did not hang freely, but was tucked into the shirt between the second and third buttons. On Sundays and for some other occasions cadets wore a "choker" instead of the shirt and tie. This was a gray jacket with a high collar. Rank was shown by stripes on both shoulders. For parades and other very formal occasions such as dances and the graduation ceremony cadets wore a jacket known as a 44 for the brass buttons on it. These had to be kept polished. The 44 had the usual stripes for rank, plus cadets had any ribbons awarded them, as well as riflery medals. These medals were the ones used by the United States military for marksman, sharpshooter and expert.

== Alumni association ==
An alumni association was formed in 1969, and still exists with its own website. One of the former EMA cadets, Roger Hall, has written about his memories and about Oheka Castle. The association's meetings (generally luncheons or dinners) were suspended in April 2020 due to the COVID-19 pandemic, but resumed in May 2021.
