= M1903 Springfield =

American bolt-action .30 caliber rifle

U.S. Rifle, Caliber .30, M1903
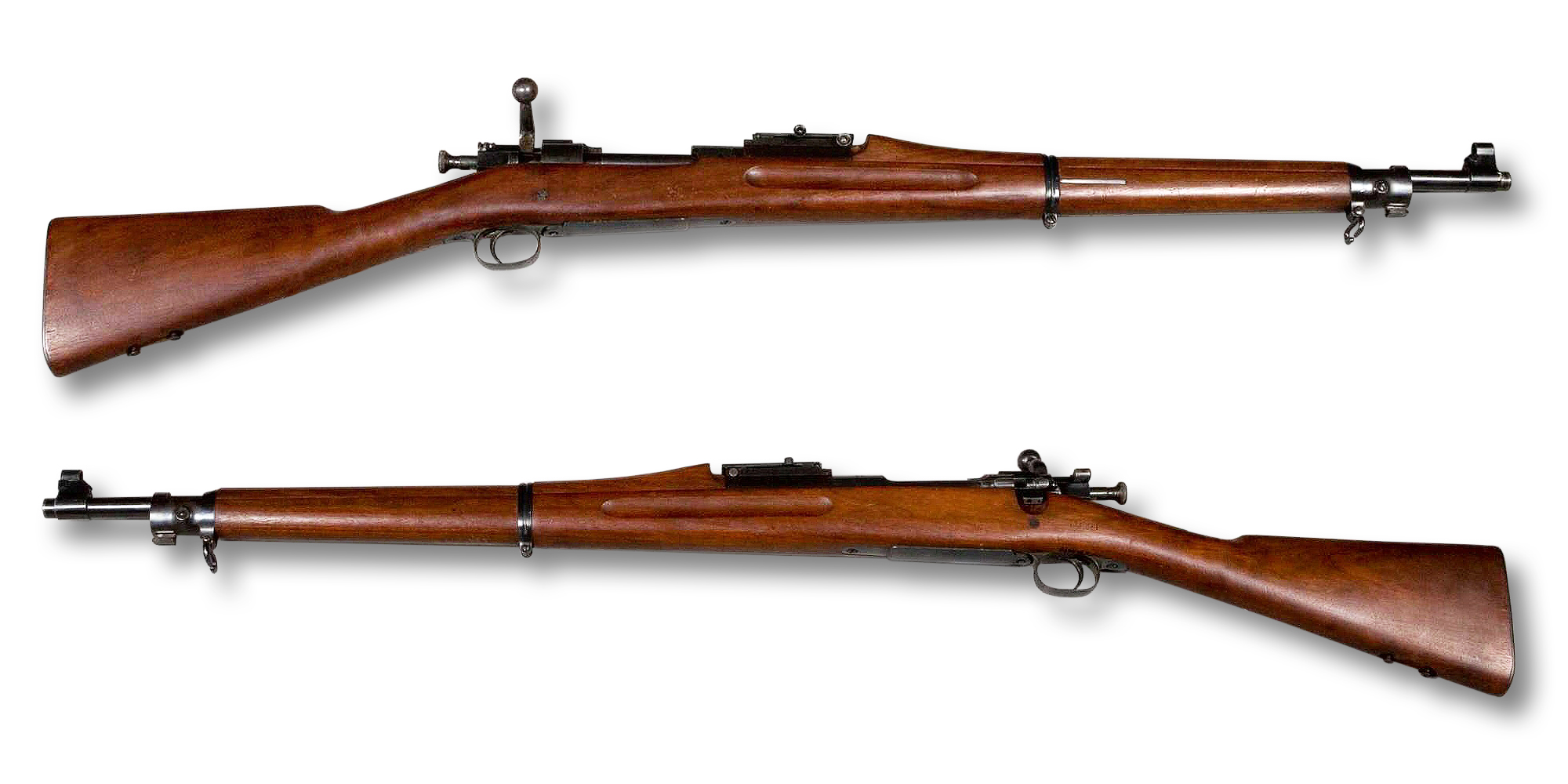
- Type: Bolt-action rifle
- Place of origin: United States

Service history
- In service: 1903–1936 (as the standard U.S. service rifle); 1936–1970s (as a U.S. Army sniper rifle)
- Used by: See Users
- Wars: Philippine–American War; Banana Wars; Mexican Revolution; World War I; Siberian Intervention; Irish War of Independence; Irish Civil War; Coto War; World War II; Egyptian revolution of 1952; Greek Civil War; First Indochina War; Chinese Civil War; Indonesian Revolution; Korean War; Cuban Revolution; Hukbalahap Rebellion; Algerian War (limited); Vietnam War (limited); Laotian Civil War; Bay of Pigs Invasion; Cambodian Civil War

Production history
- Designed: 1903
- Manufacturer: Springfield Armory; Rock Island Arsenal; Remington Arms Company; Smith Corona
- Unit cost: $41.35 (1903), equal to $1482 now
- Produced: 1903–1949
- No. built: 3,004,079
- Variants: See Variants

Specifications
- Mass: 8.7 lb (3.9 kg)
- Length: 43.2 in (1,100 mm)
- Barrel length: 24 in (610 mm)
- Cartridge: .30-03 Springfield; .30-06 Springfield
- Action: Bolt action
- Rate of fire: User dependent; usually 15 to 30 rounds per minute
- Muzzle velocity: 2,800 ft/s (853 m/s)
- Effective firing range: 100–300 yd (91–274 m)
- Maximum firing range: 5,500 yd (5,000 m) with .30 M1 ball cartridge
- Feed system: 5- or 25-round (air service variant) internal box magazine fed with 5-round stripper clips
- Sights: Flip-up rear sight graduated to 2,700 yd (2,500 m), blade post-type front sight; M1903A3: Aperture rear sight, blade type front sight.
- Blade type: Bayonet

The M1903 Springfield, officially the U.S. Rifle, Caliber .30, M1903, is an American five-round, non-removable, staggered-row box magazine-fed, bolt-action, repeating service rifle, used primarily during the first half of the 20th century.

The M1903 was first used in combat during the Philippine-American War and was officially adopted by the United States as the standard infantry rifle on 19 June 1903. It saw service in World War I and was replaced by the faster-firing semi-automatic eight-round M1 Garand starting in 1936. However, the M1903 remained a standard-issue infantry rifle during World War II, since the U.S. entered the war without sufficient M1 rifles to arm all troops. It also was used as a sniper rifle during World War II, the Korean War, and the Vietnam War. It remains popular as a civilian firearm, collector's piece, a competitive shooting rifle, and as a military drill rifle.

== History ==
=== Background ===
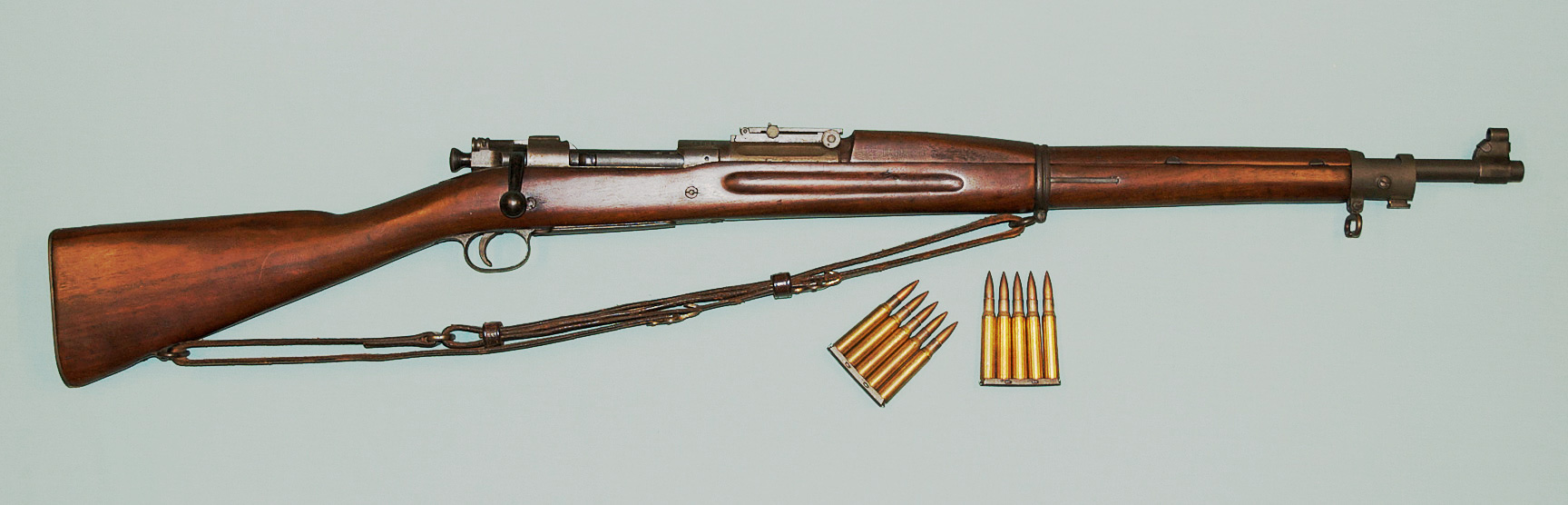
M1903 Springfield with loading clips

During the 1898 war with Spain, the Mauser M1893 used by the Spanish Army gained a deadly reputation, particularly from the Battle of San Juan Hill, where 750 Spanish regulars significantly delayed the advance of 15,000 US troops armed with outclassed Springfield Krag–Jørgensen bolt-action rifles and older single-shot Springfield model 1873 trapdoor rifles. The Spanish soldiers inflicted 1,400 casualties on the US in a matter of minutes. Likewise, earlier in the day, a Spanish force of 540 regulars armed with the same Mauser rifles, under Spanish general Vara Del Rey, held off General Henry Ware Lawton's Second Division of 6,653 American soldiers and an independent brigade of 1,800 men for ten hours in the nearby town of El Caney, keeping that division from assisting in the attack on the San Juan Heights. A US Army board of investigation was commissioned as a direct result of both battles. They recommended replacement of the Krag.

The 1903 adoption of the M1903 was preceded by nearly 30 years of struggle and politics, using lessons learned from the recently adopted Krag–Jørgensen and contemporary German Mauser Gewehr 98 bolt-action rifles. The design itself is largely based on the Mauser M1893 and its successive models up to the Gewehr 98 rifle. The M1903's forward receiver ring diameter is 1.305 in (33.15 mm), slightly over the 33 mm (1.30 in) ring diameter of the older "small ring" Mauser models and less than the "large ring" 35.8 mm (1.41 in) Gewehr 98s. The US military licensed many of the Mauser Company's and other German patents, including the spitzer bullet, later modified into the .30-06 Springfield. The M1903 not only replaced the various versions of the U.S. Army's Krag, but also the Lee M1895 and M1885 Remington–Lee used by the United States Navy and the United States Marine Corps, as well as all remaining single-shot trapdoor rifles. While the Krag had been issued with barrel lengths of both 30-inch rifle and 22-inch carbine models, the Springfield was issued only as a short 24-inch-barrel rifle in keeping with current trends in Switzerland and Great Britain to eliminate the need for both long rifles and carbines.

The two main problems usually cited with the Krag were its slow-to-load magazine and its inability to handle higher chamber pressures for high-velocity rounds. The United States Army attempted to introduce a higher-velocity cartridge in 1899 for the existing Krags, but its single locking lug on the bolt could not withstand the extra chamber pressure. Though a stripper-clip or charger loading modification to the Krag was designed, it was clear to Army authorities that a new rifle was required. After the U.S. military's experience with the Mauser rifle in the 1898 Spanish–American War, authorities decided to adopt a stronger Mauser-derived bolt-action design equipped with a charger- or stripper clip-loaded box magazine.

=== Advances in small arms technology ===
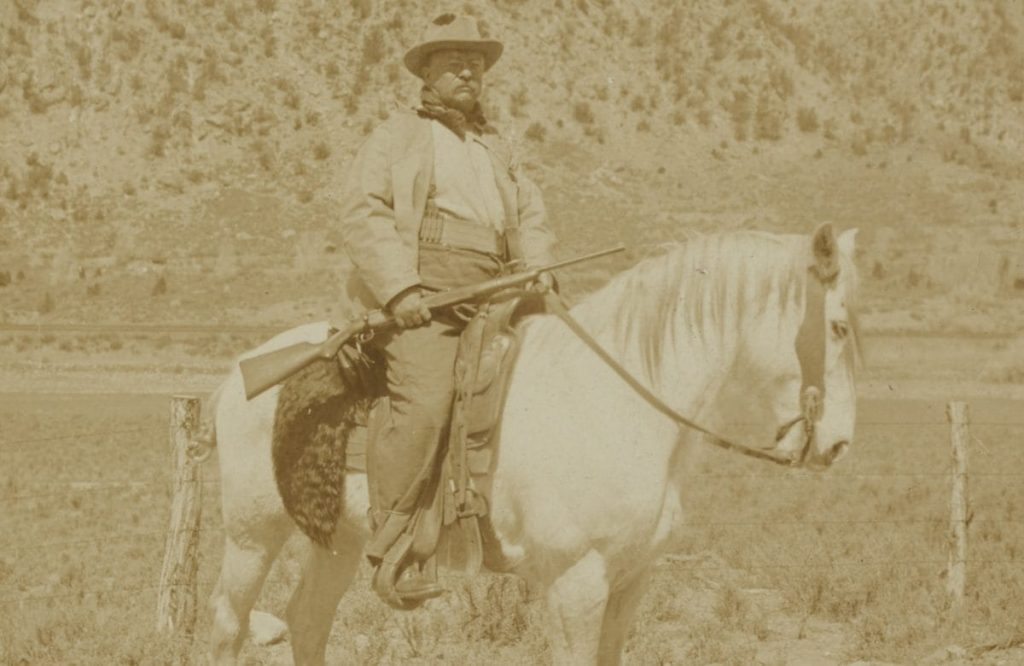
Theodore Roosevelt with an M1903

In 1882, the bolt action Remington Lee rifle design of 1879, with its newly invented detachable box magazine, was purchased in limited numbers by the U.S. Navy. Several hundred M1882 Lee Navy models (M1882 Remington-Lee) were also subjected to trials by the U.S. Army during the 1880s, though the rifle was not formally adopted. The Navy adopted the M1885, and later different style Lee M1895 (a 6 mm straight pull bolt), which saw service in the Boxer Rebellion. In Army service, both the M1885 and M1895 6 mm Lee were used in the Spanish–American War, along with the .30-40 Krag and the .45-70. The Lee rifle's detachable box magazine was invented by James Paris Lee, and was very influential on later rifle designs. Other advancements had made it clear that the Army needed a replacement. In 1892, the U.S. military held a series of rifle trials, resulting in the adoption of the .30-40 Krag–Jørgensen rifle. The Krag officially entered U.S. service in 1894, only to be replaced nine years later by the M1903.

=== Development ===
Thousands of Spanish Mauser M1893 rifles, surrendered by Spanish troops in Cuba, were returned to the US and extensively studied at Springfield Armory, where it was decided that the Mauser was the superior design.

==== U.S. rifle Model 1900 .30 prototype ====
A prototype rifle was produced in 1900; it was very similar to rifle No. 5, the final Mauser M92 prototype in the U.S. Army rifle trials of 1892. This design was rejected, and a new design combining features of the M1898 Krag rifle and the Spanish Mauser M1893 was developed.

==== U.S. rifle Model 1901 .30 prototype ====
Springfield began work on creating a rifle that could handle higher loads around the turn of the 20th century. The Springfield Model 1901 prototype combined the Krag–Jørgensen's cock-on-opening bolt, 30-inch barrel, magazine cutoff, stock and sights with the Mauser M1893's dual locking lugs, external claw extractor, and staggered-column magazine. Taking a cue from the Mauser Gewehr 98, a large safety lug was added to the side of the bolt behind the extractor, which engaged the receiver bridge and prevented the bolt from moving rearwards. The bolt handle was also bent downwards, to make it faster to operate. The Model 1901 almost entered production. Springfield was sure enough that the Model 1901 prototype would be accepted that they began making some of the parts for it, but it was not accepted; further changes were asked for.

=== Adoption ===
Following then-current trends in service rifles, the barrel was shortened to 24 inches after it was discovered that a longer barrel offered no appreciable ballistic advantage, and the shorter barrel was lighter and easier to handle. This "short rifle" also eliminated the need of a shorter carbine for mounted troops or cavalry. A spike-type bayonet with storage in the forend of the stock was added to the design. This new design was accepted, type classified and officially adopted as the United States Rifle, Caliber .30, Model 1903 and entered production in 1903. The M1903 became commonly known among its users as the "aught-three" in reference to the year, 1903, of first production.

Despite Springfield Armory's use of a two-piece firing pin and other slight design alterations, the M1903 was, in fact, a Mauser design, and after that company brought suit, the U.S. government was judged to pay $250,000 in royalties to Mauser Werke.

By January 1905, over 80,000 of these rifles had been produced at the federally-owned Springfield Armory. However, President Theodore Roosevelt objected to the design of the sliding rod-type bayonet used as being too flimsy for combat. In a letter to the secretary of war, he said:

I must say that I think that ramrod bayonet is about as poor an invention as I ever saw. As you observed, it broke short off as soon as hit with even moderate violence. It would have no moral effect and mighty little physical effect.

All the rifles to that point consequently had to be re-tooled for a blade-type bayonet, called the "M1905". The sights were also an area of concern, so the new improved Model 1904 sight was also added.

The retooling was almost complete when it was decided another change would be made. It was to incorporate improvements discovered during experimentation in the interim, most notably the use of pointed ammunition, first adopted by the French in the 1890s and later other countries. The round itself was based on the .30-03, but rather than a 220-grain (14 g) round-tip bullet fired at 2,300 ft/s (700 m/s), it had a 150-grain (9.7 g) pointed bullet fired at 2,800 ft/s (850 m/s); the case neck was a fraction of an inch shorter as well. The new American cartridge was designated Cartridge, Ball, Caliber .30, Model of 1906. The M1906 cartridge is better known as the .30-06 Springfield round, used in many rifles and machine guns, and is still a popular civilian cartridge. The rifle's sights were again re-tooled to compensate for the speed and trajectory of the new cartridge.

By the time of the 1916 Pancho Villa Expedition, the M1903 was the standard issue service rifle of US forces. Some rifles were fitted with both the Warner & Swasey Model 1913 and 1908 "musket sights" during the campaign, "musket sights" being the vernacular at the time for telescopic sights. The Warner & Swasey Model 1913 musket sight continued in use after the Pancho Villa Expedition and during World War I, but was eventually deemed inadequate and had been removed from the US Army's inventory by the 1920s.

The military tested several M1903 rifles with Maxim suppressors starting in 1909, and requisitioned 500 in 1910 to be used for recruit training. Anecdotal evidence indicates that some of the M1903 rifles during the Pancho Villa Expedition were fitted with Maxim suppressors, possibly making them the first suppressed rifles used in the field by the US military; however, during World War I American M1903s were not fitted with suppressors due to opposition from officers and the suppressor precluding the use of a bayonet.

=== World War I and interwar use ===
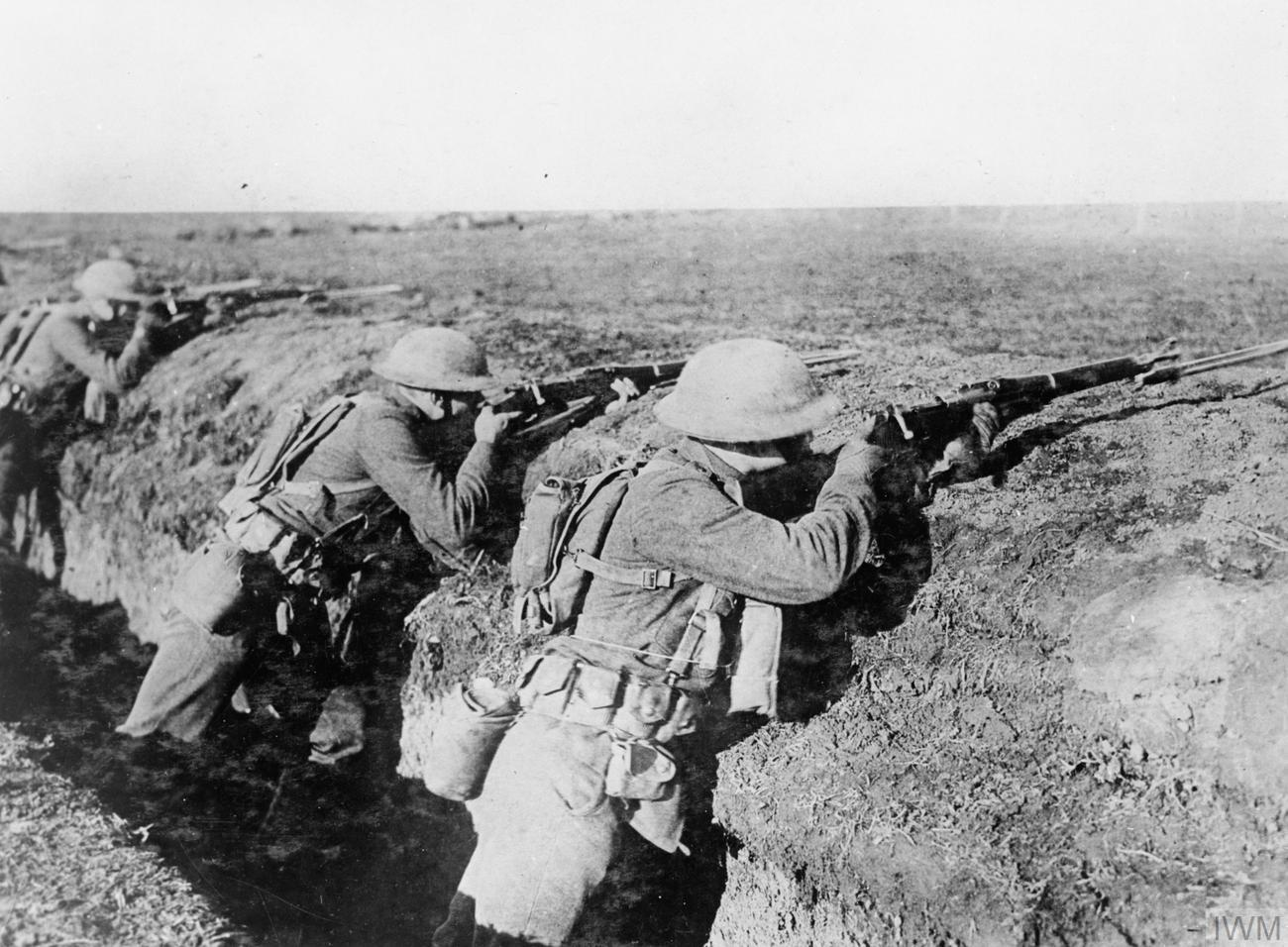
US Marines with M1903 rifles and bayonets in France, 1918

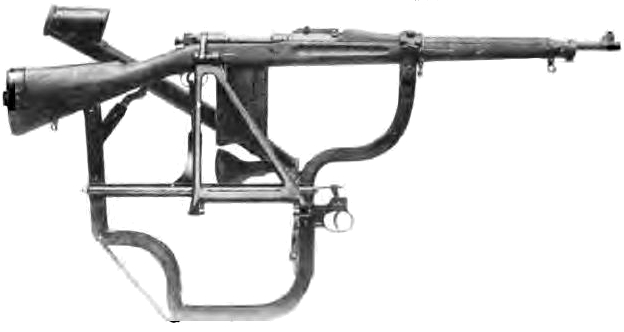
An Elder-type periscope stock fitted to an M1903 (1918). Designed for trench warfare, this enabled the shooter to fire over the parapet of a trench while remaining under cover and protected; the rifle is also fitted with a 25-round magazine.

By the time of US entry into World War I, 843,239 M1903 rifles had been produced at Springfield Armory and the Rock Island Arsenal in Illinois. Pre-war production utilized questionable metallurgy. Some receivers constructed of single-heat-treated case-hardened steel were improperly subjected to excessive temperatures during the forging process, "burning" carbon out of the steel and producing a brittle receiver. Documented evidence indicates that some early rifles were improperly forged, but actual cases of failure in use were very rare. Several cases of serious injury from receiver failure were documented, but the U.S. Army never reported any fatalities. Many failures were attributed to use of incorrect cartridges, such as the 7.92×57mm Mauser. Evidence also seems to suggest that improperly forged brass cartridge cases could have further exacerbated receiver failure.

Pyrometers were installed in December 1917 to accurately measure temperatures during the forging process. The change was made at approximately serial number 800,000 for rifles made at Springfield Armory and at serial number 285,507 at Rock Island Arsenal. Lower serial numbers are known as "low-number" M1903 rifles. Higher serial numbers are said to be "double-heat-treated".

Toward the end of the war, Springfield turned out the Model 1903 Mark I. The Mark I has a cut on the left hand side of the receiver meant to act as an ejection port for the Pedersen device, a specialized insert that replaced the bolt and allowed the user to fire caliber .30 cartridges semi-automatically from a 40-round detachable magazine. The stock was also slightly cut down on the left side to clear the ejection port. In all other respects, the Mark I is identical to the M1903. Temperature control during forging had been improved before Mark I production. The receiver alloy was toughened by addition of nickel after Mark I production.

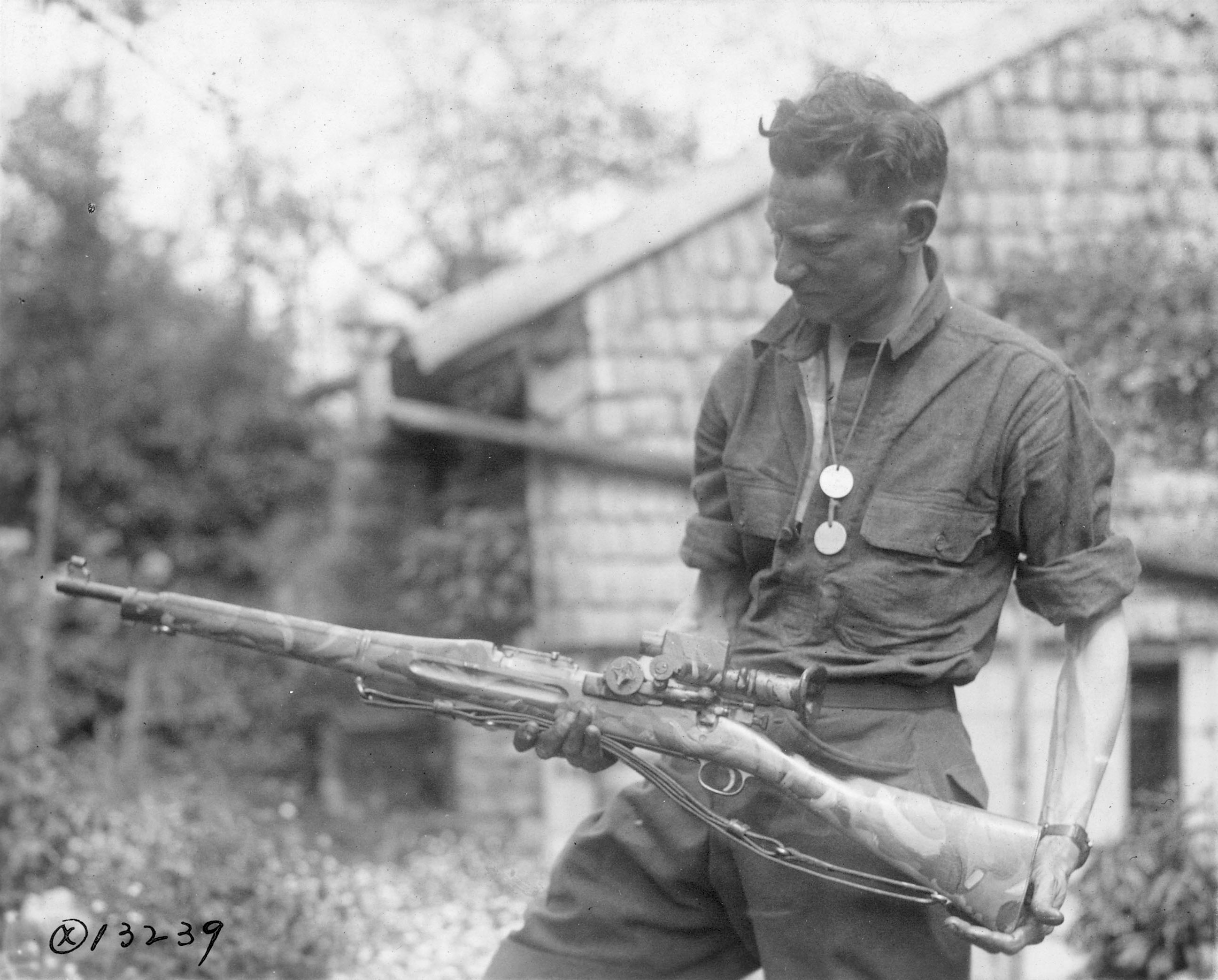
Camouflage painted M1903 Springfield sniper's rifle with Warner & Swasey telescopic sight in France, May 1918

In 1926, after experiencing the effect of long-range German 7.92×57mm rifle and machine gun fire during the war, the U.S. Army adopted the heavy, 174-grain, boat-tail bullet for its .30-06 cartridge, standardized as Cartridge, Ball, caliber 30, M1. M1 ammunition, intended primarily for long-range machine gun use, soon became known by Army rifle competition teams and marksmen for its considerably greater accuracy than the M1906 round; the new M1 ammunition was issued to infantrymen with the Springfield rifle as well as to machine gun teams. However, during the late 1930s, it became apparent that, with the development of mortars, high-angle artillery, and the .50 caliber M2 Browning machine gun, the need for extreme long-range, rifle-caliber machine-gun fire was decreasing. In 1938, the US Army reverted to a .30-06 cartridge with a 152-grain flat-base bullet, designated "M2 ball", for all rifles and machine guns.

In the 1920s and the 1930s, M1903s were delivered to US allies in Central America including Cuba, Costa Rica, and Nicaragua. Costa Rican troops were equipped with Springfields during the Coto War, and some rifles were captured by the opposing Panamanians. The Cuban Springfields were used by Batista forces after WW2 and later by the Revolutionary Armed Forces, for instance during the Bay of Pigs Invasion.

The Federal Bureau of Investigation acquired some M1903 rifles configured like National Rifle Association sporter models in response to the 1933 Kansas City Massacre.

In service, the Springfield was generally prized for its reliability and accuracy, though some problems remained. The precision rear aperture sight was located too far from the eye for efficient use, and the narrow, unprotected front sight was both difficult to see in poor light and easily damaged. The Marine Corps issued the Springfield with a sight hood to protect the front sight, along with a thicker front blade. The two-piece firing pin-striker also proved to be no improvement over the original one-piece Mauser design, and was a cause of numerous ordnance repairs, along with occasional reports of jammed magazine followers.

=== World War II ===
World War II saw new production of the Springfield at private manufacturers such as the Remington Arms and Smith-Corona Typewriter companies. Remington began production of the M1903 in September 1941, at serial number 3,000,000, using old tooling from the Rock Island Arsenal which had been in storage since 1919. The very early Remington-made rifles are almost indistinguishable from 1919-made Rock Island rifles. As the already worn tooling began to wear beyond use Remington began seeking Army approval for a continuously increasing number of changes and simplifications to both speed up manufacture and improve performance. The milled parts on the Remington M1903 were gradually replaced with stamped parts until, at about serial number 3,330,000, the Army and Remington recognized that a new model name was appropriate. Other features of the M1903, such as high-grade walnut stocks with finger grooves, were replaced with less expensive but serviceable substitutes. Most milled parts made by Remington were marked with an "R".

Production of the M1903 was discontinued in favor of the M1903A3. The most noticeable visual difference in the M1903A3 was the replacement of the barrel-mounted rear sight with a smaller, simpler aperture rear sight mounted on the rear of the receiver which was designed by Remington; it was primarily adopted in order to speed familiarization by soldiers already trained on the M1 Garand, which had a similar sighting system. However, the leaf spring providing tension to the elevation adjustment on the new aperture sight tended to weaken with continued use over time, causing the rifle to lose its preset range elevation setting. Other modifications included a new stamped cartridge follower; the rounded edges of the new design largely alleviated the "fourth-round jam" complaints of the earlier machined part. All stock furniture was also redesigned in stamped metal.

In late 1942, Smith-Corona Typewriter Company began production of the M1903A3 at its plant in Syracuse, New York. Smith-Corona parts are mostly identified by the absence of markings, except for occasions when time permitting during manufacture, on early to mid-production rifles, and also only on certain parts.

To speed up production, two-groove rifled barrels were adopted, and steel alloy specifications were relaxed under "war emergency steel" criteria for both rifle actions and barrels. All M1903A3 rifles with two-groove "war emergency" barrels were shipped with a printed notation stating that the reduction in rifling grooves did not affect accuracy. As the war progressed, various machining and finishing operations were eliminated on the M1903A3 in order to increase production levels.

Original production rifles at Remington and Smith-Corona had a dark gray-black finish similar to the bluing of late World War I. Beginning in late 1943 a lighter gray-green parkerizing finish was used. This later finish was also used on arsenal repaired weapons.

It is somewhat unusual to find a World War I or early World War II M1903 with its original dated barrel. Most, if not all, World War II .30-06 ammunition used a corrosive primer which left corrosive salts in the barrel. If not removed by frequent and proper barrel cleaning, these residues could cause pitting and excessive wear. Cleaning was sometimes lax when fighting in the jungle on various Pacific islands, and the higher moisture levels compounded the corrosive action of the residue.

The M1903 and the M1903A3 rifles were used in combat alongside the M1 Garand by the US military during World War II and saw extensive use and action in the hands of US troops in Europe, North Africa, and the Pacific. The US Marines were initially armed with M1903 rifles in early battles in the Pacific, such as the Battle of Guadalcanal, but the jungle battle environment generally favored self-loading rifles; later Army units arriving to the island were armed with M1 Garands. The U.S. Army Rangers were also a major user of the M1903 and the M1903A3 during World War II with the Springfield being preferred over the M1 Garand for certain commando missions. The US Army Military Police (MP) and the US Navy Shore Patrol also used M1903s and M1903A3s throughout the war.

According to Bruce Canfield's U.S. Infantry Weapons of WW II, final variants of the M1903 (the A3 and A4) were delivered in February 1944. By then, most American combat troops had been re-equipped with the M1 Garand. However, some front-line infantry units in both the U.S. Army and Marine Corps retained M1903s as infantry rifles beyond that date and continued to use them alongside the M1 Garand until the end of the war in 1945. The Springfield remained in service for snipers (using the M1903A4), grenadiers (using a spigot type rifle 22 mm with the M1 grenade launcher until the M7 grenade launcher was available for the M1 rifle in late 1943), and Marine scout sniper units.

==== Sniper rifle ====
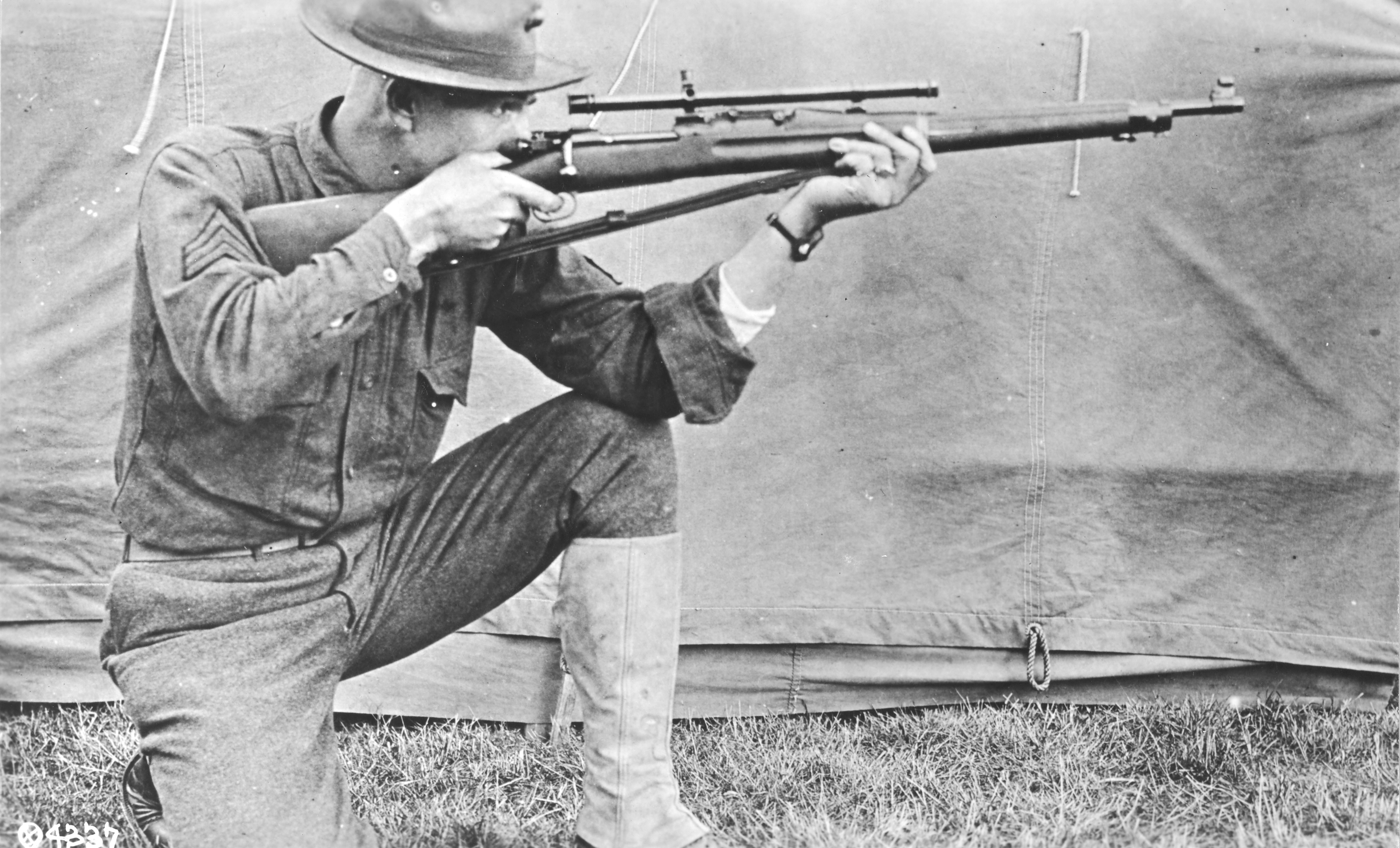
M1903 Springfield with a telescopic sight

The M1903A4, a variation of the M1903A3 was the U.S. Army's sniper rifle of choice during the Second World War. The only difference between receivers was that the model and serial number on the receiver were split on M1903A4 to make room for the Redfield scope mount. The Redfield scope mount removed the rear peep sight that was standard on the M1903A3. The scope used on the M1903A4 was a Weaver Model 330 or 330C, which was a 2.75x telescopic sight. The receivers were tested by Remington Arms and those that were deemed best, meaning those closest to design specifications were selected to become M1903A4s. The barrels were also selected specifically to be added to the M1903A4 rifle only if they were within almost exact specifications for the design. The front sight on the barrel was never installed on the A4 barrels, however, the notch for it was still in place. Barrel specifications were, in general, unchanged between the M1903A3 and M1903A4, however, the War Department did start installing barrels with two-groove rifling instead of four-groove, despite the lack of clear changes from the four-groove rifling that was the standard until 1942. From its adoption in 1943 until the end of the war the M1903A4 was used extensively in every theater of operation by both the US Army and the USMC.

While the M1903A4 was a relatively accurate rifle with an effective range of about 600 yards (550 m), by some accounts it was inadequate as a sniper rifle. Its limitations on long-range targeting were due to limitations of both the Weaver scopes. The Weaver scopes (later standardized as the M73 and M73B1) had limited field of view, were of low magnification, and were not waterproof and frequently fogged over or became waterlogged during humidity changes. The optional M81/82 scopes also had significant flaws; they most notably had less power (2.2x vs. 2.75x) and, like the other scopes on the M1903A4, had serious issues with the field of view. The USMC and the US Army eventually switched to a large 8x scope that spanned the length of the rifle, designed by John Unertl.

==== Foreign users ====
Various US allies and friendly irregular forces were equipped with the weapon. The Brazilian Expeditionary Force (FEB), operating in the 5th Army in Italy, was equipped with M1903 rifles. In August 1943, the Free French Forces of General Charles de Gaulle were re-equipped by the United States, primarily with M1903 Springfield and M1917 Enfield rifles. The M1903 became one of the primary rifles used by French forces until the end of the war, and was afterwards used in Indochina and by local militia and security forces in French Algeria. Large numbers of M1903 rifles were sent to China. The M1903 rifles captured by the Germans were designated Gewehr 249(a).

During the Korean War, South Korean Marines used the M1903A3.

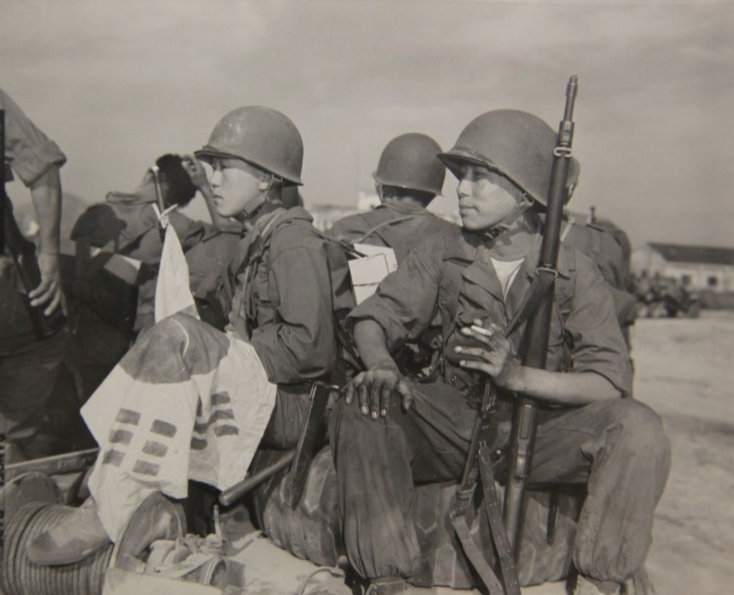
South Korean marine armed with M1903 rifle, 20 September 1950

=== Korean War ===
The M1903A4 was slowly phased out during the Korean war by the Army, but saw extensive use in the Marine Corps in the form of the M1941 Sniper rifle. This new rifle was simply equipped with a very long and powerful Unertl 7.8x (as compared to the M73B1 2.5X telescopic sights issued with the army's M1903A4) variant type scope. It was used in situations when the range to the target simply exceeded that of the Marines' M1C and M1D sniper rifles, which were effective to about 500 yards (460 m). In some rare cases, kills from up to 1,000 yards (910 m) were reported by Marines using the M1941 sniper rifles.

=== Post–Korean War service ===
After the Korean War, active service (as opposed to drill) use of the M1903 was rare. Marine Corps armorers continued to rebuild some M1903 sniper rifles as late as the early stages of U.S. involvement in the Vietnam War and technical manuals for them were printed as late as 1970. The U.S. Navy also continued to carry some stocks of M1903A3s on board ships for use as anti-mine rifles.

=== Today ===
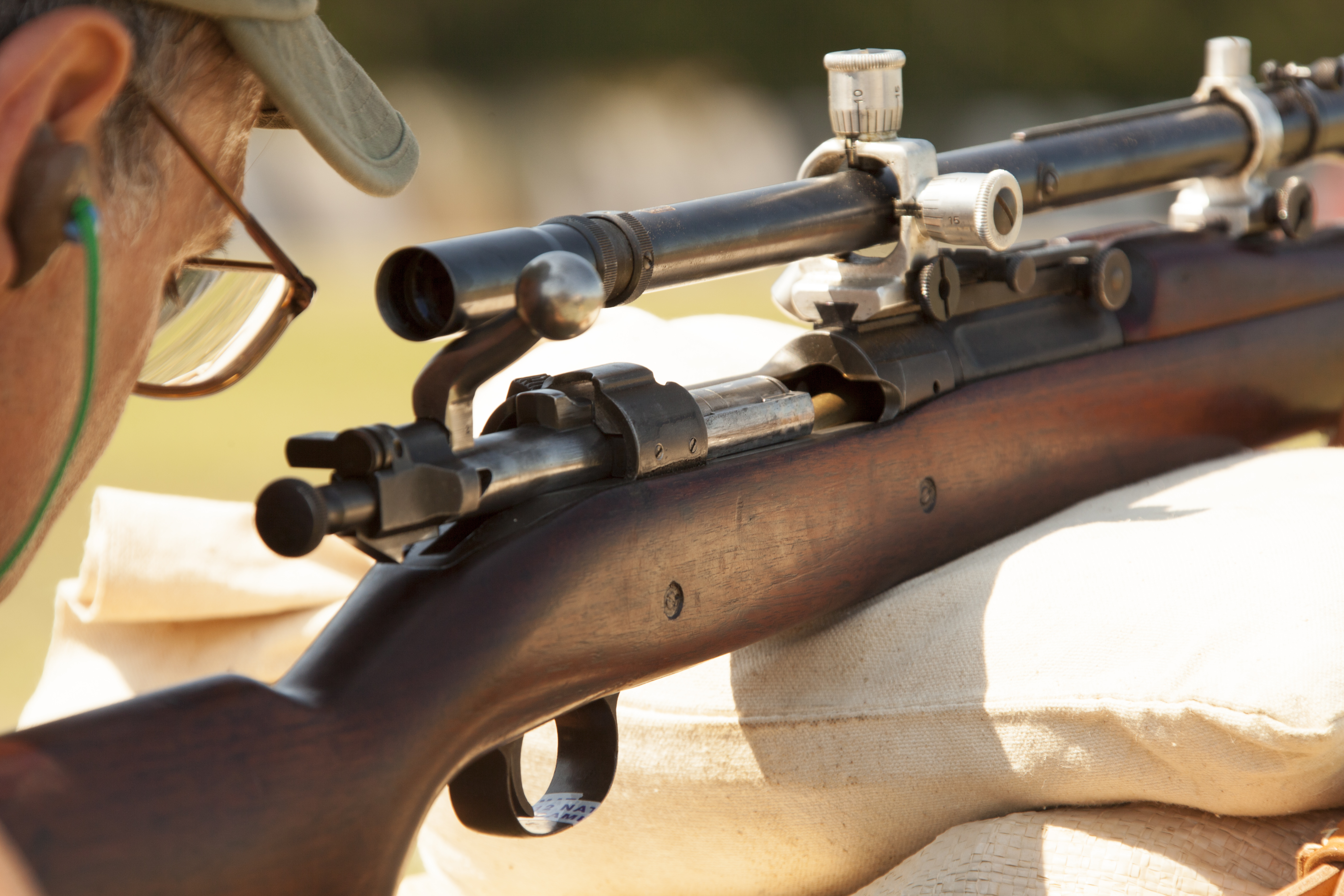
M1903 Springfield with 8x Unertl scope used during a vintage sniper rifle match in 2012.

Due to its balance, the M1903 is still popular with various military drill teams and color guards, most notably the U.S. Army Drill Team. M1903 rifles (along with the M1 Garand, M1917 Enfield and M14 rifles) are also common at high school Junior Reserve Officer Training Corps (JROTC) units to teach weapons handling and military drill procedures to the cadets. JROTC units use M1903s for regular and inter-school competition drills, including elaborate exhibition spinning routines. Exhibition teams often use fiberglass stocks in place of wooden stocks, which are heavier and more prone to breaking when dropped. JROTC Color Guards still favor wooden stocks over fiberglass because of their weight characteristics and appearance. The M1903 is the standard parade rifle of the Virginia Tech Corps of Cadets, which has over six hundred M1903s, very few of which are still fireable. The Summerall Guards of The Citadel also use the M1903 Springfield for their silent drill performances.

U.S. Naval Sea Cadet Corps color guard rifles bear many similarities to the 1903 Springfield, although they are non-functional replicas with a plugged bore.

In 1977, the U.S. Army located a rather large cache of unissued M1903A3 rifles which were demilitarized and then issued to JROTC units as a replacement for their previously issued M1 Garand and M14 rifles, which were then returned to Army custody due to concerns about potential break-ins at high school JROTC armories.

For safety reasons, the JROTC M1903s are demilitarized to make them permanently unable to fire by plugging the barrel by inserting a very cold steel rod which became too tight to remove after expanding when warmed to room temperature, or having it filled with lead, soldering the bolt and welding the magazine cutoff switch in the "off" position.

== Specifications ==
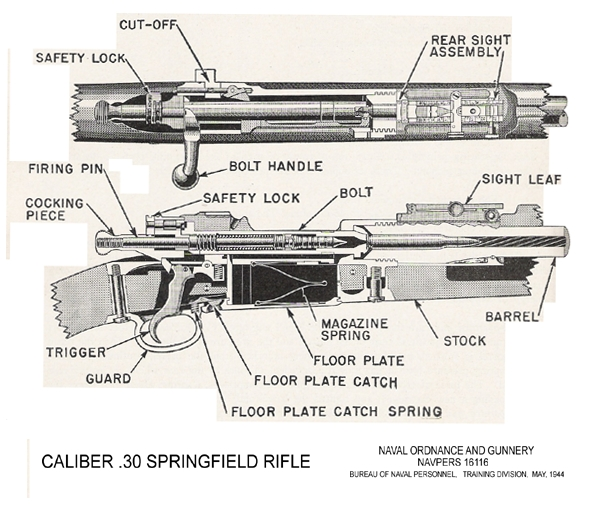
Diagram of the .30 Springfield rifle

The US rifle, Model of 1903 is 44 7/8 inches (1.14 m) long and weighs 8 lb 11 oz (3.9 kg). A bayonet can be attached; the M1905 bayonet blade is 16 in (410 mm) long and weighs 1 pound (0.45 kg). From 1906, the rifle was chambered to fire the .30 caliber M1906 cartridge (.30-06 cartridge), later the M1 (1926) and M2 ball (1938) rounds. There were four standard types of cartridge:

- Ball: consists of a brass case or shell, primer, a charge of smokeless powder, and the bullet. The bullet has a sharp point called a spitzer, and is composed of a lead core and a jacket of cupro-nickel (later gilding metal), and in the M1906 design, weighs 150 grains (9.7 g). The bullet of the M1906 cartridge, when fired from the rifle, has an initial velocity of 2,700 ft/s (820 m/s).
- Blank: contains a paper cup instead of a bullet. It is dangerous up to 33 yd (30 m).
- Guard: has a smaller charge of powder than the ball cartridge, and five cannelures encircle the body of the shell at about the middle to distinguish it from ball cartridges. It was intended for use on guard or in riot duty, and it gives good results up to 200 yd (180 m). The range of 100 yd (91 m) requires a sight elevation of 450 yd (410 m), and the range of 200 yd (180 m) requires an elevation of 645 yd (590 m).
- Dummy: this is tin-plated and the shell is provided with six longitudinal corrugations and three circular holes. The primer contains no percussion composition. It was intended for drill purposes to accustom the soldier to the operation of loading the rifle.

The rifle is a magazine-fed clip-loader and can fire at a rate of 20 shots per minute. Each stripper clip contains five cartridges, and standard issue consisted of 12 clips carried in a cloth bandoleer. When full the bandoleer weighs about 3 lb 14 oz (1.8 kg). Bandoleers were packed 20 in a box, for a total of 1,200 rounds. The full box weighs 100 lb (45 kg).

The bore of the rifle is 0.30 inches (7.62 mm) in diameter. It was then rifled 0.004 in (0.1 mm) deep, making the diameter from the bottom of one groove to the bottom of the opposite groove 0.30787 in (7.82 mm) of the barrel.

The M1903 rifle included a rear sight leaf that can be used to adjust for elevation and windage. This type of rear sight was previously designed by Adelbert R. Buffington of the U.S. Army Ordnance Department. The M1905 rear sight was calibrated to match the trajectory of M1906 service ammunition and offers several sighting options. When the leaf and slider are down, the battle sight notch appears on top. This was set for 547 yd (500 m) for the down position of the slide, and is not adjustable. When the leaf is raised its range slider can be adjusted to a maximum range of 2,850 yd (2,606 m). The .30-06 Springfield M1906 service ammunition long-range performance was originally overstated. When the M1906 cartridge was developed, the range tests had been done to only 1,800 yd (1,646 m); distances beyond that were estimated, but the estimate for extreme range was wrong by almost 40 percent. The external ballistic discrepancy at long-ranges became evident during World War I. The M1905 rear sight can also be adjusted for windage.

The M1903A3 introduced a ramp-type rear aperture sight adjustable both for elevation and windage. It can be adjusted from 100 to 800 yd (91 to 732 m). This new sightline also lengthened the sight radius.

A feature inherent to the M1903 and not found on the Mauser M98 is the cocking piece, a conspicuous knob at the rear of the bolt, allowing the rifle's striker to be released without dry firing, or to cock the rifle if necessary, for example to attempt a second strike on a round that failed to fire. This was implemented from the U.S. model of the Krag–Jørgensen rifle.

== Variants ==
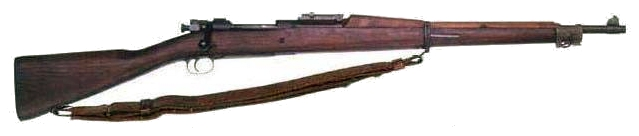
M1903

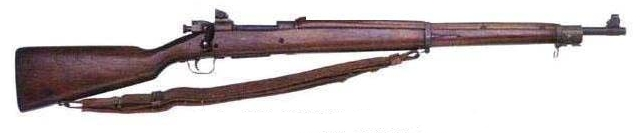
M1903A3

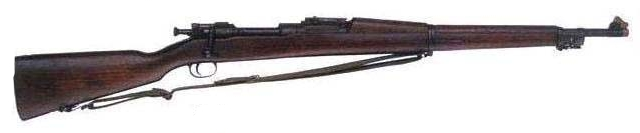
M1903 with 'scant' stock

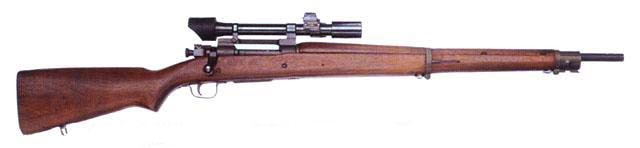
M1903A4 with Type C stock and M84 sight

There were four main variants given official nomenclature, though there are a number of important sub-variants:

- M1903 (1903): developed for the .30-03 (also known as the .30-45) cartridge. Used original Type S stock.
  - M1903 bullpup (1903): experimental bullpup conversion for the USMC.
  - M1903 (1905): changed from a rod type bayonet to the knife type Model 1905 bayonet and to the improved Model 1905 sight.
  - M1903 (1906): modified again to specifically fire the new M1906 .30-06 cartridge ("ball cartridge, caliber 30, Model of 1906").
  - M1903 NRA (1915–1917): sold to National Rifle Association members and stamped "NRA" on the forward tang of the trigger guard.
  - M1903 air service (1918): issued to aircrew with permanent 25-round magazine and modified Type S stock forend designed as backup if a plane's machine gun jammed in combat.
  - M1903 Mark I (1918–1920): modified with an ejection port on the left side of the receiver for specific use with the Pedersen device.
  - M1903 NM (1921–1940): selected rifles produced at Springfield Armory for National Match shooting competition. Production barrels were measured with star-gauges, and those meeting specified tolerances were stamped with an asterisk shaped star on the muzzle crown. These barrels were fitted to selected receivers with hand-fitted and polished parts. The bolt was left unblued while the receiver and barrel were finished with a black Parkerizing process. Some bolts have the safety direction reversed to prevent it from striking the nose of a right-handed shooter and those made from 1924 to 1929 have the knurled cocking piece removed to decrease lock time. Early rifles used the type S stock until the type C stock became standard in 1929. Rifles made for sale to NRA members (priced at $40.44) were drilled and tapped for a Lyman 48 receiver sight and had either a type B (or NB) stock with no grasping grooves and a noticeable drop at the heel for a long pistol grip, or a special National Match stock with a high comb and pistol grip. Total production was 28,907. Most were issued to service teams and 25,377 were reconditioned at Springfield Armory after one year of match use. Reconditioned rifles have a large gas-escape port drilled into the left side of the receiver.
  - M1903 Bushmaster carbine (1940s): the barrel and stock were cut down to 18 inches (460 mm) for easier use in Panama; 4,725 such rifles were made. It was a training rifle and saw no action. After World War II most were dumped into the ocean and surviving pieces are rare.
  - M1903 with "scant" stock (1942): in late 1941, before the M1903A3 was standardized, Army ordnance wanted to standardize on a pistol-grip stock for all M1903 rifles. There were thousands of stock blanks that had been sized for the old straight stock. They were not deep enough for the full pistol grip of the Type C stock, so they were modified to allow a "scant" grip that was the largest grip they could form. These "scant" stocks would only fit on a M1903, and would not fit an 03A3. Springfield only rebuilt existing M1903 rifles using this stock in 1942 and marked the cut-off seat with a small "s".

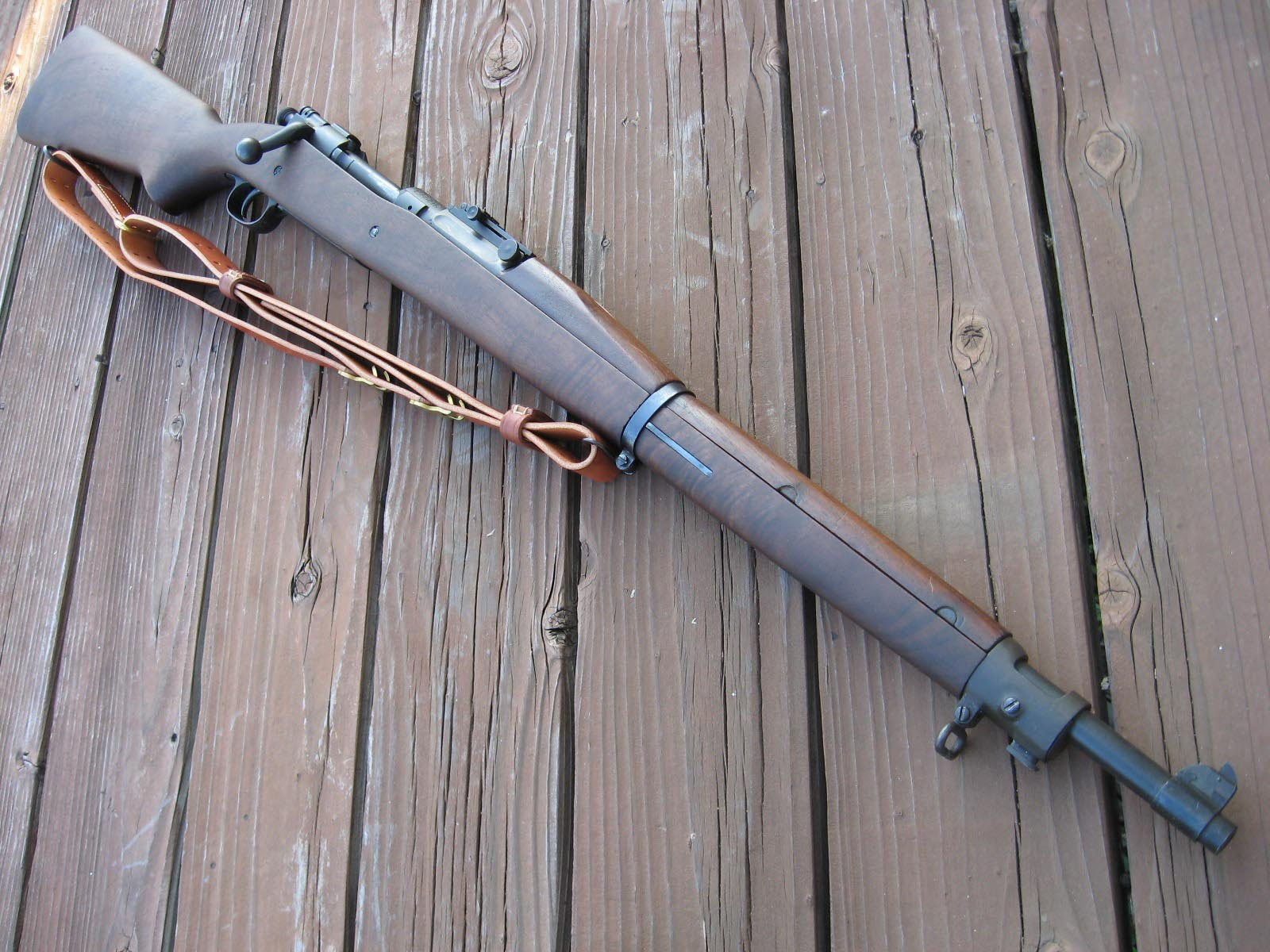
Springfield M1903A1

- M1903A1 (1929–1939): changed from a straight stock to a pistol grip type stock (Type C stock). The pistol grip stock was conducive to improved marksmanship and was fitted to National Match rifles until World War II. Pistol grip stocks became standard for later M1903 production and were subsequently fitted to older rifles. The Army considered any rifle with a pistol grip stock an M1903A1, but M1903 receiver markings were unchanged.
- M1903A2 (1930s–1940s): basically a stripped A1 or A3 used as a subcaliber rifle with artillery pieces.
- M1903A3 (1942–1944): sights were changed to an aperture (peep) system mounted on the receiver, and the rifle was modified for easier production with stamped metal parts and somewhat different grip and stock (late model Type S stock; no finger grooves).
  - M1903 (modified) (1941–1942): transition production of M1903 rifles by Remington Arms until the M1903A3 design was implemented involved modification of various parts creating a hybrid between the M1903 and M1903A3.
- M1903A4 (1942): an M1903A3 modified to be a sniper rifle using an M73 or M73B1 2.5× Weaver telescopic sight and different stock, and omitting the iron sights. USMC versions instead used the 8x Unertl scope.

There are two main other types, various training types, and competition versions such as the National Match types. Aside from these there are some other civilian versions, experimental versions, and other miscellaneous types. Due to the duration of its service, there is also a range of smaller differences among ones from different periods and manufacturers.

In military use it was outnumbered by the M1917 Enfield for much of the war. Also, during World War II many remained in use early on, especially in the Pacific (generally replaced as M1s became available), in addition to service (along with other weapons) as a sniper rifle and to launch rifle grenades.

- Bannerman Springfield: After the outbreak of World War I in 1914, Scottish-born military surplus magnate Francis Bannerman VI assembled 1,000 M1903 rifles from surplus parts which were rebored to accept .303 British ammunition. He presented these to the British Army together with bayonets, pouches and webbing as a patriotic gesture. However, the conversion was not a success and it was found that rimmed .303 cartridges would not feed properly from the magazine. The rifles were stamped "DP," i.e., fit for "drill purposes" only, and presented to the City of London's Volunteer Training Corps, who were otherwise without any weapons.

=== Automatic conversion ===
In 1904 the US Government authorized Springfield to sell the M1903 to inventors, this measure was taken to assist the private firearms industry which in return should improve the capabilities of the military.

- Headspace-Operated Prototype Rifle
- Experimental primer-actuated conversion made in 1921.

== In popular culture ==
Ernest Hemingway used an M1903 to shoot big game, including lions, on his first African safari in 1933. His experiences during the safari is the subject of Green Hills of Africa, published in 1935.

An M1903A4 is used by Private Daniel Jackson in the film Saving Private Ryan.

== Users ==
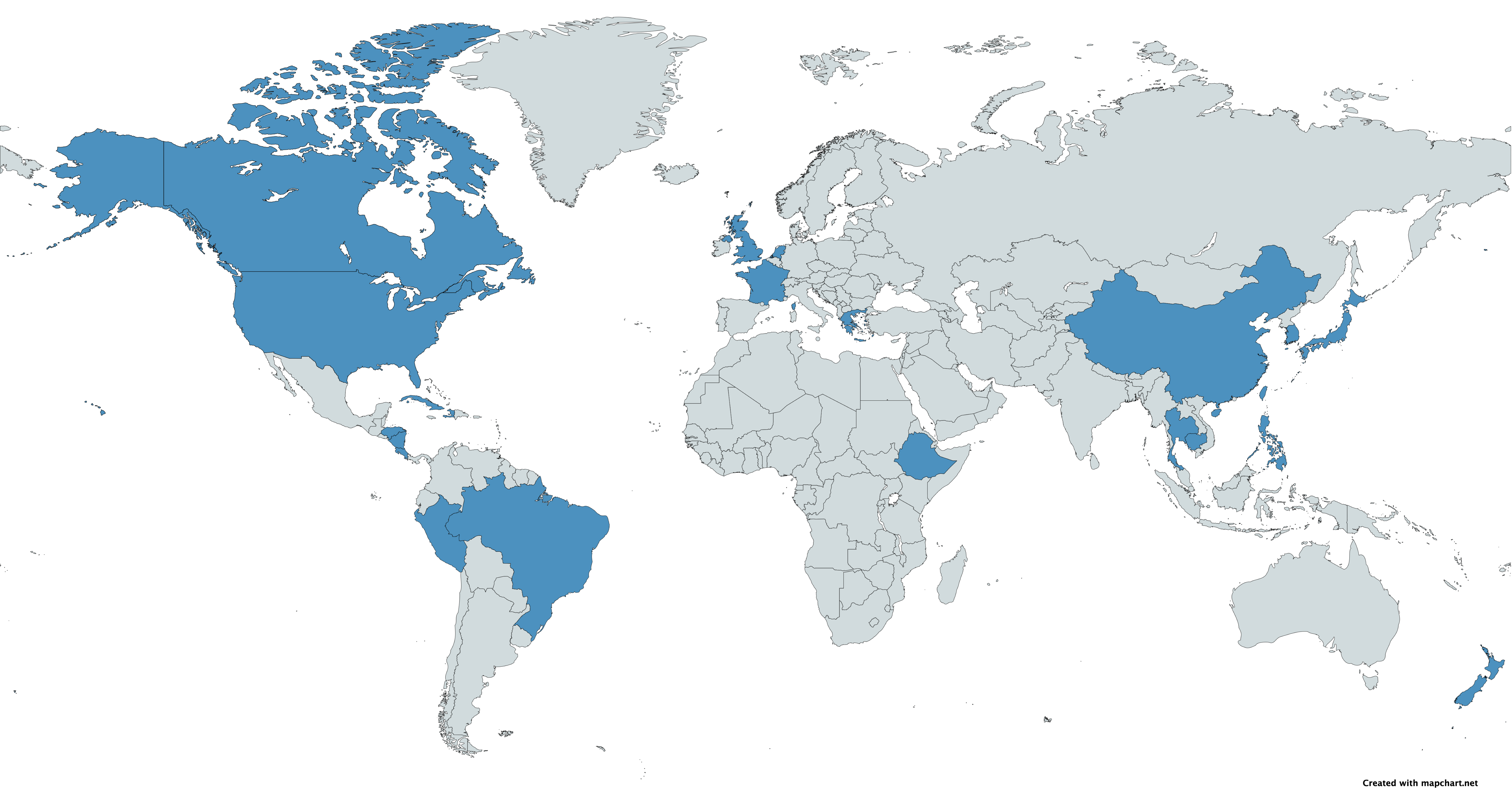
A map with M1903 Springfield users in blue

- Austria: Equipped with 470 M1903A4s used as a marksman rifle. Called "Zielfernrohrgewehr 03" in Austrian service.
- Brazil
- Cambodia
- Canada
- China
- Costa Rica
- Cuba
- Ethiopia: Received after World War II.
- France
- Nazi Germany: Captured rifles from American soldiers designated the Gewehr 249(a). Captured rifles from Commonwealth soldiers designated the Gewehr 249(e).
- Greece
- Haiti: Issued to Gendarmerie
- Honduras: Equipped with 2,083 M1903s in 1950.
- Italian Partisans: Supplied to partisans operating in the vicinity of American troops.
- Japan: Captured during World War II. Used by National Police Reserve after the war.
- Laos
- Netherlands: Used by the Netherlands Marine Corps during the Indonesian National Revolution.
- New Zealand
- Nicaragua
- North Vietnam
- Peru
- Philippines
- Republic of China
- Republic of China (Taiwan)
- South Korea : Equipped with 216 M1903A3s before the Korean War. The number in service peaked at 3,611 in 1951, and was reduced to 393 by the end of the war. The military also received 100 and 109 M1903A4s in 1952 and 1953, respectively.
- South Vietnam
- Thailand
- United Kingdom
- United States: Used among Junior ROTC and United States Naval Sea Cadet Corps.

== See also ==
- Captured US firearms in Axis use in World War II
- Lee–Enfield rifle – Contemporary British Army rifle
- List of U.S. Army weapons by supply catalog designation
- Springfield M1922 – A cadet rifle, designed to mimic the M1903 Springfield rifle for training purposes
- Springfield rifle – For all other "Springfield" rifles

Preceded by Springfield Model 1892–99	United States Army rifle 1903–1936	Succeeded by M1 Garand
