= Guido (disambiguation) =

Guido is a male given name. It may also refer to:

Guido may also refer to:

- Guido (slang), slang term for Italian-American
- Guido (surname)
- GUIDO music notation, a computer music notation format
- Guido Island, Wilhelm Archipelago, Antarctica
- 120361 Guido, an asteroid
- GUIDO, a Guidance Officer or flight controller in Apollo space missions
- Guido, a character in Disney and Pixar's Cars franchise.

== See also ==
- Big Guido (born 1964), ring name of Italian-American professional wrestler Michael Santoni Jr.
- Little Guido (born 1972), another ring name of American professional wrestler Nunzio (wrestler)
