= John Lee (inventor) =

Scottish-Canadian inventor

- Born: 25 June 1833; Hawick, Scotland
- Died: 30 October 1907 (aged 74); Wallaceburg, Ontario, Canada
- Occupation: Arms designer
- Known for: Inventing a prototype bolt-action rifle
- Spouse: Louisa Cordelia Clifford (1837–1921)
- Children: James Paris Lee, Frank Lee
- Relatives: James Paris Lee (brother)

John Lee was a Scottish Canadian inventor and arms designer, best known for inventing a prototype bolt action rifle with his brother James Paris Lee. The rifle they made led to the Lee–Metford and Lee–Enfield series of rifles.

== Life ==
Originally from Hawick, Scotland, Lee was born in 1833 to jeweller George Lee (c. 1803–8 April 1866) and Margaret Paris (9 Sep 1803–before 1852). He was one of two living brothers (James Paris Lee was born in 1831), and two sisters. The Lee family emigrated to Upper Canada c. 1836, to Galt. In adulthood, John moved to Wallaceburg where he owned a foundry. His brother married Caroline Chrysler and moved to Stevens Point, Wisconsin.

John married Louisa Cordelia Clifford (1837–1921) and had two (confusingly) James Paris and Frank.

James later moved to Connecticut and died in Galt in February 1904, whilst John died in Wallaceburg in October 1907.

== Lee rifle ==
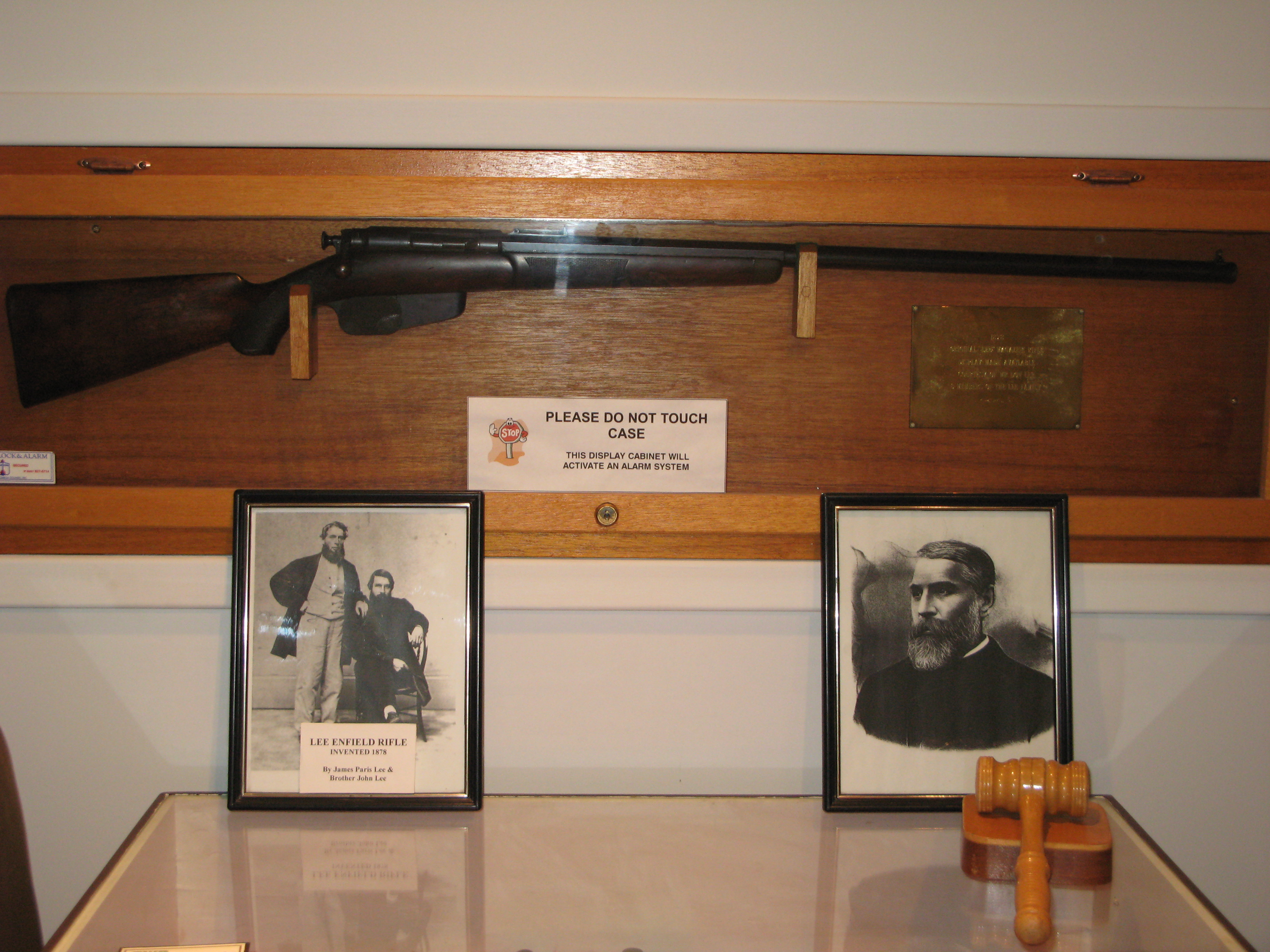
Lee Rifle Prototype 1878

As children the brothers experimented, sometimes unsafely with consequences, with rifle development and using gunpowder. Inventing continued into their adulthood.

With the outbreak of the American Civil War (1861–1865), brother James worked on converting muzzle-loading cartridges for breech-loading rifles, and travelled to Washington; a contract was signed for 1000 breech-loading carbine, and a partnership formed to create Lee's Firearms Company. Later James moved to Wallaceburg, north of Chatham, the town founded by his wife's grandfather and where she was the first Caucasian born in the town.

In 1878, John and his brother James Paris created a bolt action rifle with a box magazine in Wallaceburg. This rifle was a predecessor to the famous Lee–Enfield rifle. The prototype was tested successfully with the first shots occurred just outside the Lee foundry, the target being an oak tree across the Sydenham River, Wallaceburg. A well trained shooter could fire approximately 15-30 shots a minute. The rifle, still in existence, is housed at the Wallaceburg and District Museum.

Picked up by James' employer, Philo Remington, the Model 1879 was bought in large numbers by the US Navy and other countries.

In 1888, an agreement with the British War Office saw the creation of the 'Rifle, Magazine, Mk.1', which in 1895 became the 'Rifle, Magazine, Lee-Enfield, Mk.1’ (until replaced as the standard service rifle of the British Armed Forces in 1957). The 1888 version of the rifle was by 2016 still in use by police in Bangladesh.

== Prototype rifle controversy ==
The Lee rifle prototype has been a controversial topic. Local citizens believe it is the original prototype. Outsiders and critics claim three other rifles date back to the same period as when the prototype was created.

Eugene Myszkowski, a Lee rifle historian examined the prototype in the Wallaceburg museum. In his opinion, the rifle predates the Borchardt patent of 1882. The museum prototype differs from post-Borchardt patent rifles in that it has a riveted magazine spring. Myszkowski outlines how post-Borchardt rifles were different: "[They] solder[ed] two stamped shells together, using a riveted magazine spring and a shallow magazine catch notch in the rear rip. The cartridge guide grooves were only on the upper rear of the magazine." The museum prototype has none of the later specifications.

== Commemoration ==
In the spring of 1964, Frank Mann, Wallaceburg's local historian, and Darcy McKeough, Chatham-Kent's MPP, corresponded. Their letters discussed the possibility of erecting a plaque to commemorate the first test shot of the Lee rifle in Wallaceburg. The two discovered they needed the approval of the Archaeological and Historic Sites Board of Ontario (AHSBO) to get official historic site designation.

Historians and dignitaries such as Canadian historian J.M.S. Careless, Richard Apted, Harry Pietersma and politician James Auld helped research and facilitate the investigation. In over a decade of study, few documents substantiated that the first shot occurred in Wallaceburg. Nonetheless, the AHSBO recognized the vast amount of other evidence could not be dismissed. Most of the testimonials came from oral history passed down through the descendants of James Paris and John Lee. On 2 July 1975 a plaque was erected in Municipal Park, now Civic Square Park, close to the original location of John Lee's foundry, stating in part, ... Tradition holds that this [the first firing] occurred at Wallaceburg while Lee was visiting his brother John, a local foundry owner.
