= Guidon =

Guidon may refer to:

== Flags ==
- Guidon, a type of heraldic flag
- Guidon, a military flag – see Military colours, standards and guidons
  - Guidon (United States), a military standard or flag in the United States military and Coast Guard

== People ==
- Anita Moen-Guidon (born 1967), Norwegian former cross-country skier
- Giachem Guidon (born 1961), Swiss former cross-country skier
- Niède Guidon (1933–2025), Brazilian archaeologist
- Shimiray Mwissa Guidon, leader of Nduma Defense of Congo-Renovated, a militia group in the Democratic Republic of the Congo, from 2014 to 2021

== Other uses ==
- Guidon (music), a music notation symbol that is similar to a catchword in literature
- Guidon (rank), a military rank equivalent to ensign
- The GUIDON, the student newspaper of Ateneo de Manila University, Quezon City, Philippines
- The Guidon Club, an anti-suffragette club founded by Helen Kendrick Johnson
- Guidon Games, an American wargames publisher

== See also ==
- Guido (disambiguation)
- Guide (disambiguation)
