= General Douglas MacArthur Military Academy =

Location
- Mount Freedom, New Jersey
- Coordinates: 40.82449°N 74.56949°W

Information
- Type: Military school
- Opened: 1966
- Closed: 1975
- Superintendent: John Hoar
- Principal: Floyd Trowbridge
- Grades: 4-12
- Campus type: Rural
- Colors: Black and Gold
- Team name: The Generals

General Douglas MacArthur Military Academy was a military high school that was started by dissatisfied staff, faculty, and parents of Eastern Military Academy during the final years of that school's existence. It was named for General Douglas MacArthur. The school existed from 1966 to 1975 and was located in Mount Freedom, New Jersey.

The school took over Lieberman's Royal House Hotel. The building was subsequently demolished. The site is vacant.
