= Guido (surname) =

Guido is a surname. Notable people with the surname include:

- Alejandro Guido (born 1994), American soccer player
- Beatriz Guido (1924–1988), Argentine novelist and screenwriter
- Guilherme Guido (born 1987), Brazilian swimmer
- José María Guido (1910–1975), interim President of Argentina from 1962 to 1963
- Luigi Guido (born 1968), Italian judoka
- Marcello Guido (born 1953), Italian architect
- Margaret Guido (1912–1994), British archaeologist, prehistorian, and finds specialist
- Tomás Guido (1788–1866), general in the Argentine War of Independence, diplomat and politician
