= Lee–Metford =

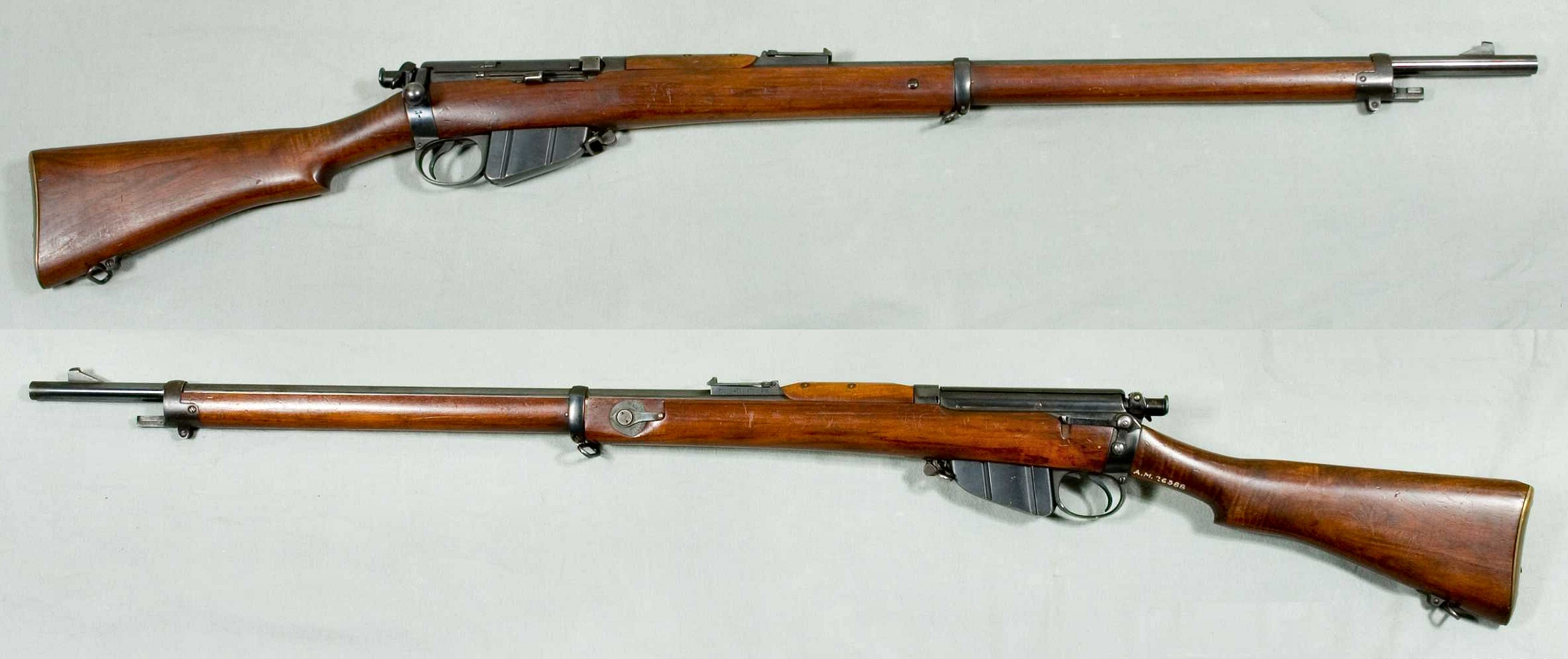
- Type: Service rifle
- Place of origin: United Kingdom

Service history
- In service: 1888–present (ceremonial)
- Used by: See Users
- Wars: British colonial conflicts; First Sino-Japanese War; First Italo-Ethiopian War; Second Boer War; Boxer Rebellion; Irish War of Independence; Chaco War

Production history
- Designer: James Paris Lee, RSAF Enfield
- Manufacturer: RSAF Enfield
- Unit cost: £3/15/– = £ 3.75 in 1892-1893
- Produced: 1884–1896
- Variants: Mk I* Mk II; Mk II*; Carbine Mk I

Specifications
- Mass: 7.43 lb (3.37 kg) to 9.5 lb (4.3 kg)
- Length: 29.9 in (760 mm) to 49.5 in (1,260 mm)
- Barrel length: 20.75 in (527 mm) to 30.2 in (770 mm)
- Cartridge: Cartridge .303 Mk I
- Calibre: .303 in (7.7 mm)
- Action: Bolt-action
- Rate of fire: 20 rounds/minute
- Muzzle velocity: 2,040 ft/s (620 m/s)
- Effective firing range: c. 800 yards (730 m)
- Maximum firing range: 1,800 yards (1,600 m)
- Feed system: 6, 8 and 10-round magazine
- Sights: Sliding leaf rear sights, Fixed-post front sights, "Dial" long-range volley sights

The Lee–Metford is a British bolt action rifle. It was the first British Bolt-action rifle and combined James Paris Lee's rear-locking bolt system and detachable magazine with an innovative seven-groove rifled barrel designed by William Ellis Metford. It replaced the Martini–Henry as the standard service rifle of the British Empire in 1888, following nine years of development and trials, but remained in service for only a short time until replaced by the Lee–Enfield.

== Design ==
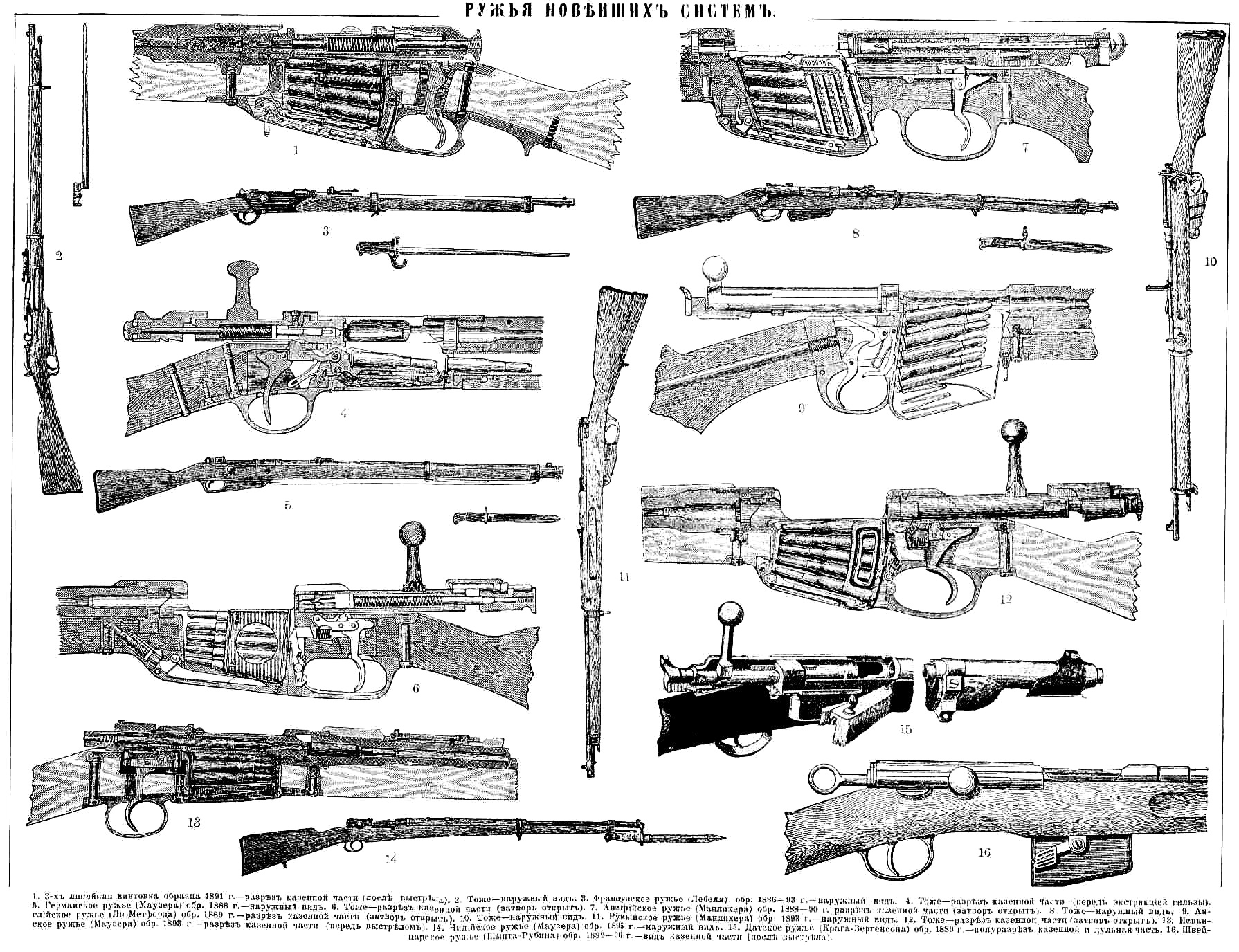
Schematic. Image #9 and #10

The Lee-Metford was the very first Bolt-action rifle ever introduced to the British Military. It combined the bolt action breech and box magazine of James Lee and William Metfords shallow segmental rifiling. When issued to the Army in 1888 the Lee-Metford Mk I had a weight of 9.5 pounds (4,300 g) a barrel length of 30.2 inches (770 mm) an overall length of 4.125 feet (1,257 mm) and a calibre of 0.303 inches (7.7 mm) Its magazine had a capacity of eight rounds. The magazine consists of a sheet-steel box, inserted in the body through an opening underneath, and directly in front of, the trigger-guard. It is held in position by a spring in the body engaging in a notch on the magazine.

The cocking-piece allows the action to be set at half-cock, enabling the rifle to be carried safely. The bolt and bolt head are covered to protect the action from sand and mud. On the left side of the body is a safety-catch which, when pulled back with the rifle at full cock, prevents the trigger from being pressed. With the springs eased and the cocking piece in the forward position, the action is locked and the bolt is prevented from being opened inadvertently. The stock consists of the fore-end and the butt. A projection under the rear part of the small of the butt forms a so-called 'pistol grip'. A stock bolt secures the butt to the body of the rifle. The butt plate at the back of the butt is fitted with a trap providing access to the empty portion of the stock bolt recess. This is intended to contain an oil bottle and a jag, which is a cleaning implement that screws onto the cleaning rod.

The nose cap has a bar at the top for attaching the bayonet below the barrel. The cleaning rod is threaded at one end so that the cleaning tip fits onto it. A protective wooden handguard is fixed over the breech end of the barrel to prevent burns when the barrel becomes hot. Two steel springs clip around the barrel to hold it in place. The rifle comes with two sets of sights. The front sight and rear sight are fixed in the standard positions on the barrel. The rifle is also fitted with extreme range sights. The cleaning rod jag is made of steel. One end is tapped to receive the cleaning rod, and the other end is slotted to receive the cleaning material.

Initially the Lee-Metford Mk I fired a 0.303 inches (7.7 mm) (actually 0.312 inches (7.9 mm)) cartridge. (Note: The official name was Cartridge S.A. Ball .303 inch Powder, Mk I) The case consisted of solid drawn brass and was fully rimmed. The lead bullet had a nickel jacket and weighed 215 grains (13.9 g). With 71.5 grains (4.63 g) of black powder it had a muzzle velocity of 1,850 feet per second (560 m/s).

The cartridge was something of an anachronism, due to its use of black powder By the time of the rifle's introduction, rifle design had moved on to using small-calibre smokeless powder cartridges, which allowed bullets to be propelled at much higher velocities without as much smoke or residue. Thus after successful experiments a smokeless cartridge was introduced in November 1891. (Note: It was officially named Cartridge S.A. Ball, 303-in., Cordite Mark I) The case was made of solid drawn brass, with formed cap chamber, separate anvil and one fire-hole. The copper cap contained 2 grains (130 mg) of cap composition. The charge was about 31 grains (2.0 g) Cordite. The bullet consisted of 98 per cent lead and 2 per cent antimony. It had a cupro-nickel jacket (80 per cent copper and 20 per cent nickel, with a permissible allowance of 5 per cent iron) was flat-nosed and weighed about 215 grains (13.9 g) giving it a muzzle velocity of 1,970 feet per second (600 m/s).

== Variants ==
=== Mark I* ===
Adopted in January 1892 it differed from the Mark I in having a re-graduated rear sight and a barleycorn front sight, rather than the notched front sight of the Mark I. The safety catch was removed and it fired the .303 in smokeless powder cartridge.

=== Mark II ===
Introduced in 1892 it had a 10-round magazine; a lighter barrel a modified bolt and a modified receiver. The bolt cover was made of spring steel and held on by clipping in place rather than being screwed on as with early models. The cut-off became thinner and received a small stud for keeping it in place when in the "off" position. The finger grooves were removed and the fore-end became fuller. The bayonet lug, the nose cap and the upper band were combined. The rear swivel was now at the butt of the trigger guard and the cleaning rod was shortened.

=== Mark II* ===
When introduced in 1895 the Mk II* received a new form of safety-catch which could lock the action in both the "cocked" and "un-cocked" positions. It featured a transverse bar that could be adjusted using a thumb-piece mechanism. The bar was cylindrical but had a portion cut away so that when it was in firing position, the bolt was free to pass it. When in locked position, the cylinder engaged in one or other of the two grooves cut in the bolt. The bolt extended by about an inch at the rear, where there were two grooves for operating the safety catch. In addition, the cocking piece was lengthened and fitted with a new safety catch, complete with pin and spring. The striker was also lengthened to accommodate the altered cocking piece.

=== Carbine Mark I ===
The carbine introduced in 1894 was identical with the Mk II* except for 20.75 inches (527 mm) barrel, a wooden handguard, front sight protected by wings on the nose-cap and a only 6-round magazine. Due to its modifications it weighed only 7.43 pounds (3.37 kg).

== Users ==
- Ethiopia
- Paraguay: 3,000 were brought into the country by Liberal rebels in 1904. Also in service during the Chaco War
- India
- China
- Germany: The rifle used by German Shanghai Volunteer Corps.

== See also ==
- British military rifles
- M1895 Lee Navy
- M1885 Remington-Lee

== Bibliography ==
- Esposito, Gabriele (2022). Armies of the first Sino-Japanese War 1894-95. Oxford: Osprey. ISBN 978-1-4728-5130-7.
- de Quesada, Alejandro (2011). The Chaco War 1932–35: South America's greatest modern conflict. Bloomsbury. ISBN 978-1-84908-417-8.
- Grant, Neil (2015). Mauser Military Rifles. Bloomsbury. ISBN 978-1-4728-0595-9.
- Muller, C. F. J. (1986). Five Hundred Years: A History of South Africa. Academica. ISBN 978-0-86874-271-7.
- Murray, Nicholas (2013). The Rocky Road to the Great War: The Evolution of Trench Warfare to 1914. Potomac. ISBN 978-1-61234-105-7.
- Pankhurst, Richard (1971). "Linguistic and Cultural Data on the Penetration of Fire-Arms into Ethiopia". Journal of Ethiopian Studies. 9 (1). ISSN 0304-2243. JSTOR 41965823.
- Pegler, Martin (2012). The Lee-Enfield Rifle. Oxford: Osprey. ISBN 978-1-84908-789-6.
- Pollard, Hugh (1983). Pollard's History of Firearms. New York: Macmillan. ISBN 0-02-597630-3.
- Reynolds, E. G. B. (1960). The Lee-Enfield Rifle. New York: Arco Publishing.
- Skennerton, Ian (1997). Small Arms Identification Series No. 7: .303 Magazine Lee-Metford and Magazine Lee-Enfield. Gold Coast QLD (Australia): Arms & Militaria Press. ISBN 0-949749-25-7.
- Skennerton, Ian D. (2001). Special Service Lee-Enfields ... Commando & Auto Models: 45 De Lisle Commando Carbine, Charlton, Howell & Rieder Rifles and Howard Francis Carbine Notes & Illustrations. Arms & Militaria Press. ISBN 978-0-949749-37-6.
- Skennerton, Ian (2007). The Lee–Enfield. Gold Coast QLD (Australia): Arms & Militaria Press. ISBN 978-0-949749-82-6.
- Smith, W. H. B.; Smith, Joseph E. (1965). The Book of Rifles. Harrisburg: Stackpole.
