= James Paris Lee =

British–Canadian firearms designer

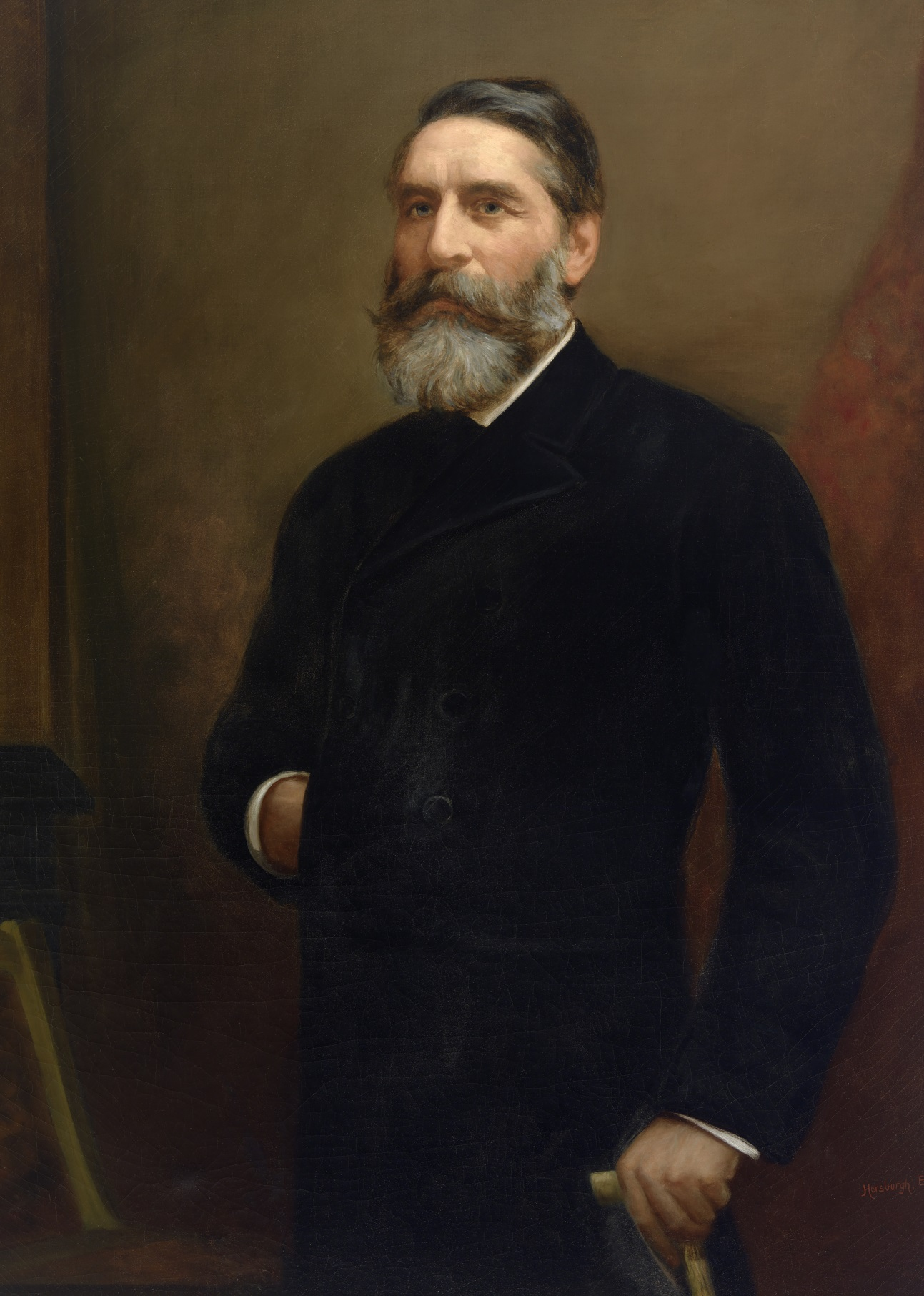
- James Paris Lee
- Born: James Paris Lee; 9 August 1831; Hawick, Roxburghshire, Scotland
- Died: 24 February 1904 (aged 72); Galt, Ontario, Canada
- Occupation: Weapons designer
- Spouse: Caroline Chrysler Lee
- Children: William Lee, George Miles Lee
- Relatives: John Lee (brother)

James Paris Lee (9 August 1831 – 24 February 1904) was a British Canadian inventor and arms designer. He is best known for having invented the Lee Model 1879 rifle, which is the first bolt-action detachable box magazine-fed rifle. These features would be incorporated into more successful repeating rifle designs later on, such as in the Lee–Metford and Lee–Enfield rifle series.

== Early life ==
Born in Hawick, Scotland, Lee emigrated with his family to Galt, Upper Canada in 1836 at age 5. He built his first gun at the age of 12, using an old horse-pistol barrel, a newly-carved walnut stock, and a priming pan made from a halfpenny. The gun failed to function effectively when first fired, but started Lee's interest in gunsmithing and invention.

In 1858, James Lee and his wife Caroline Lee (née Chrysler, of the later automotive family) moved to Wisconsin in the US, where they had two sons: William (born in 1859) and George (1860). They later returned to Canada in 1865.

== Rifle developments ==
In 1861, Lee developed a breech-loading cartridge conversion for the Springfield Model 1861 rifle musket, managing to acquire a contract for 1,000 rifles from the US Army during the American Civil War. The Lee Civil War carbine was manufactured in Milwaukee, Wisconsin. In total 250 were delivered but due to a bore diameter error, these were rejected by the army and the weapon did not see use in the Civil War. These guns are rare and highly collectible.

In 1872, he submitted a single-shot breech-loading rifle to a US Army Trials board which was considering a replacement for the 'trapdoor' system of Erskine S. Allin, which had begun in 1865 as a conversion of the Model 1861 Rifle Musket. The Allin design had progressed through several modifications, including the Model 1866 (another conversion) and the models of 1868, 1869, and 1870. With the exception of the M1865 in .58 rimfire, all the others were .50-70 centerfire. Lee's sample (in the newly-authorized .45-70 cartridge) had a hammer-operated falling-block design, similar to the Peabody and the Martini. His rifle did not win the trials (that honour went to the latest Allin design, the Model 1873) but with further consideration his gun was found worthy. $10,000 was appropriated, and Lee moved to Springfield, Massachusetts, to supervise construction of the new rifle. Tooling consumed most of the money, and only 143 rifles were built. Known to collectors as the "Model 1875 Springfield-Lee Vertical Breech", it is one of the rarest and most desirable Springfield arms of the post-Civil War period.

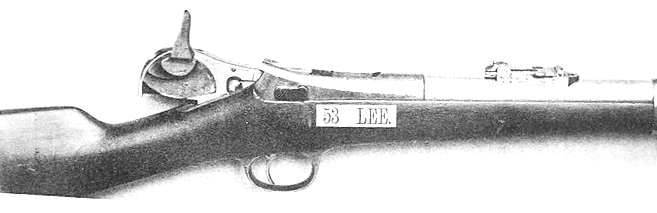
Lee No. 53 (2 lbs 7 oz. (1.106 kg))

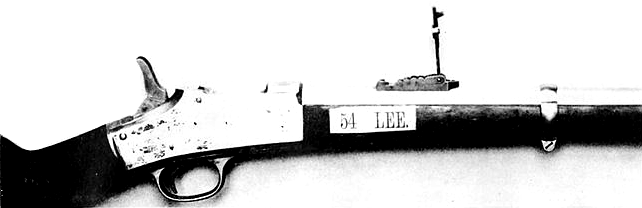
Lee No. 54 (2 lbs 13 oz. (1.276 kg))

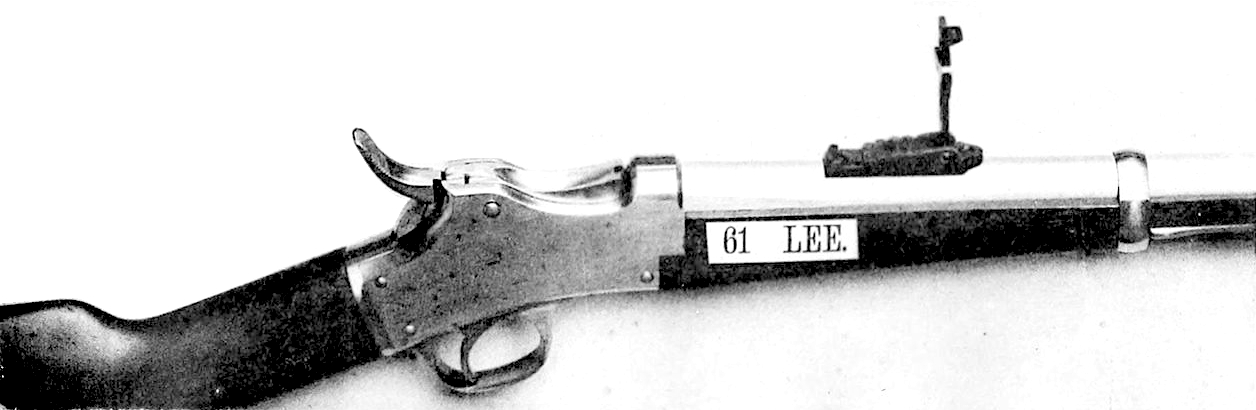
Lee No. 61 (2 lbs 11 oz. (1.219 kg))

== The Lee magazine systems and rifles ==
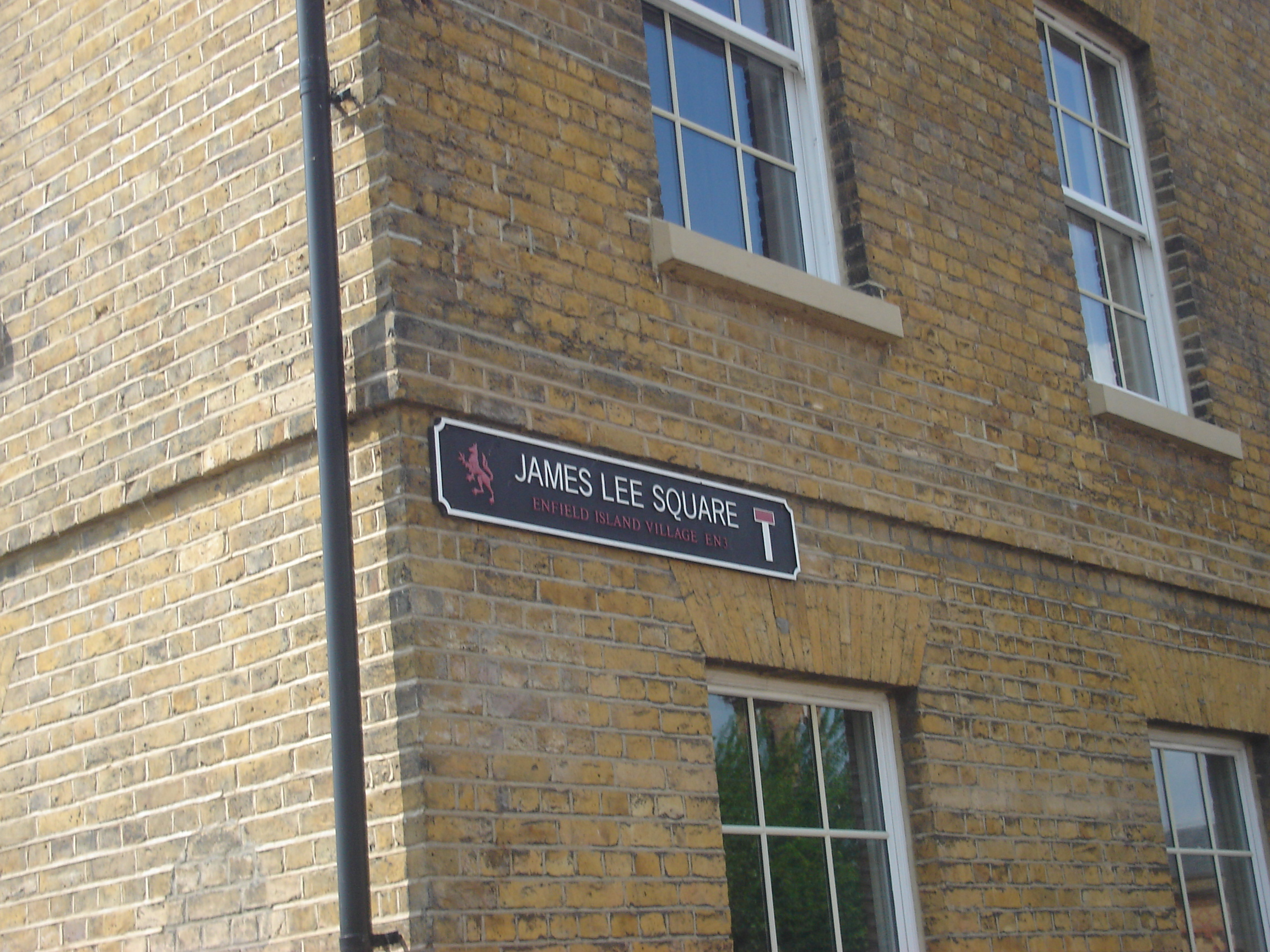
James Lee square at Enfield Island Village formerly the Royal Small Arms Factory

The Lee Model 1879 rifle was a landmark rifle design, incorporating a turn-bolt action and a spring-loaded column-feed detachable box magazine system. this was Lee's first successful magazine-fed repeating rifle. Two first designs—Model 1879 and Model 1882 were adopted by China and the US Navy, and two later designs—the Remington-Lee M1885 and the Winchester-Lee or Lee Navy M1895—were also adopted militarily and sold commercially.

His bolt-action and box-magazine fed design interested the British ordnance authorities and in 1889, after extensive trials, the British Army decided to adopt the Rifle, Magazine, Lee–Metford (RMLM) as a standard issue arm. This in turn developed into the Rifle, Short, Magazine, Lee–Enfield (or SMLE), the standard British service arm for many decades and in official service for nearly a century.

Perhaps Lee's greatest individual impact on modern small arms development came with his invention for a spring-loaded column-feed magazine system for centerfire cartridge rifles. The main advance of the Lee magazine was that it carried its cartridges in two columns, rather than the single column which was typical of the time. This allowed twice the ammunition to be carried without making the magazine any deeper or longer. When fitted with a charger bridge, the Lee magazine could be quickly reloaded with either individual cartridges, like a tubular-feed magazine (which was in vogue for military rifles in certain nations of that era), or with a charger (aka stripper clip) holding five rounds each. These charger clips were similar to the Lee or Mannlicher en bloc clip systems, except that the rounds were stripped off the charger into the magazine, rather than having the entire clip with all of the cartridges placed into the weapon, as was the case with the en bloc clips. This was desirable, because the main drawbacks of the en bloc clip system is that the weapon cannot be loaded without a clip, it cannot be used as a single-shot weapon, and you cannot top-off a partially full magazine; all shots must either be fired or ejected before a new clip could be loaded (which is inconvenient when a soldier finds himself between actions with only a few cartridges left in the magazine with no way to reload). The charger system avoided all this, allowing ammunition to be carried in units of five and rapidly loaded like an en bloc clip, but also allowing it to be easily used without the clips (albeit with somewhat slower loading). Although the charger clip was invented by Paul Mauser in 1889, for the Mauser M1889 rifle, it was not quickly adapted to the new Lee-Metford rifle, the first rifle using Lee's action and two column box magazine design (the second being the famed Lee-Enfield), because they were considered to make the ammunition heavier, and hinder the ability to replenish the magazine with separate rounds. It was believed that the capacity of the magazine is already sufficient, and in a pinch it would be easier to give the riflemen additional magazines for emergency reloading. It was not until the end of the Second Boer War that it became apparent that the ability to load from clips saw a clear advantage.

The Lee magazine was perfectly compatible with the charger device, in its later development 1903 SMLE Mk I onward, unlike tube-magazine guns, and had other advantages over the Mauser-style, five-shot, single column magazine. The Lee magazine differed in holding the ammunition in two vertical columns, rather than a single stack, allowing for ten rounds to be carried in a magazine that was no deeper than that of the M1889 (although later Mauser rifles, such as the Mauser Model 1893 were influenced by the Lee magazine; they retained the five-shot capacity and remained non-detachable, but they adopted double columns, allowing the entire magazine to fit within the stock, rather than protruding below in front of the trigger guard, like that of the Mauser, Mosin–Nagant, Carcano, Mannlicher, and in other rifle designs of that period).

Having a magazine holding ten rounds which is loaded via five-round charger clips also allows the soldier to reload the magazine every time he fires five shots, just like he would with a five-round magazine, only with a five-round reserve at all times. With a 5-shot magazine, you have to wait until the gun is empty before reloading with another charger; in an Enfield, the only time you need to completely empty the magazine is in cases of emergency. The rest of the time you can use it as a five-shot rifle with a five-round charger clip in reserve. This is one reason why the UK never adopted 10-round chargers to go with the ten-round magazines. Another benefit of the detachable magazine was that with the magazine detached, the rifle became a single-shot weapon, a feature seen as desirable by some countries for training purposes or for maintaining control over sometimes unreliable colonial or indigenous troops, many of whom were hardly familiar with breech-loaders at all, let alone repeating firearms. It also allowed the rifle to be used as a single-shot weapon during long-range volley fire, with the full magazine set aside for when the enemy closed and rapid fire was needed (the later magazine cutoff device was intended for a similar purpose).

The Lee magazine was also adaptable to a variety of cartridges and bolt systems regardless of bullet shape or cartridge length, whereas a non-detachable magazine (such as used on the Mauser Gewehr 98) had to be designed and fitted integrally with the rest of the gun; in order to deepen the magazine of a Mauser, one would have to redesign the entire action, as the magazine is machined integrally with the receiver; the capacity of a tube magazine is constrained by the length of the weapon. Because the cartridges were stored in a double column and the magazine wasn't integral to the rifle, the Lee magazine could be easily deepened to store additional cartridges in keeping with evolving small arms doctrine. Although no Lee rifle ever carried more than ten rounds (with the exception of the so-called "trench" magazines from World War I, which was designed to use a 20-round magazine), the design served as the basis for what later became the universal standard for military rifles, the detachable, sheet-metal box magazine. In combat, the detachable magazine theoretically allowed a soldier to carry many loaded magazines, thus speeding reloading time, although this was never practised until much later on. At the time Lee's magazine was introduced, rifle magazines were expensive to fabricate and could not be regarded as expendable items.

Lee's idea of carrying additional loaded magazines was not seen as an advantage by most major military forces at the time, who preferred to issue the soldier with loose cartridges or charger clips; loading by inserting a full new magazine did little to speed up the loading process over a stripper clip, and added a great deal of cost (one or two stripper clips can be made at a fraction of the price), and a metal magazine also weighs a great deal more, adding to a soldier's ammunition load. With the exception of handguns, it wasn't until rifles with magazine capacities of 20 rounds or greater were invented that detachable magazines were regularly used to carry ammunition in (although many pistols and most submachine guns adopted detachable magazines at a very early date). While the costs of carrying full magazines were not thought to outweigh the benefits in a rifle with a five- or ten-round magazine, the time it took to load a 20-round magazine with stripper clips was considered excessive, and militaries switched to rifles with double-column, detachable magazines in the Lee style. Although video games and movies frequently depict soldiers armed with Lee–Enfield rifles loading by inserting a new magazine in reality the Lee-Enfield rifle was always loaded by stripping two five-round charger clips into the magazine, in both World War I and World War II. The only exception was that soldiers armed with pre-charger loading Lee-Metford and Lee-Enfield were sometimes equipped with a single spare magazine, while the first magazine was attached to the rifle with a chain link as it was feared that the primary magazine might be accidentally detached and lost, something that wasn't a risk on weapons without detachable magazines. The earlier Remington-Lee rifle could also be fitted with a Mills belt with pockets for carrying four (5-round) magazines. Lee's detachable column-feed magazine system eventually became the pre-eminent design after World War II, and served as the basis for the box magazines used in all modern military small arms.

Lee independently and concurrently developed an en bloc charger-loaded magazine along the lines of the system developed by Austrian engineer Ferdinand von Mannlicher, which was used in the M1895 Lee Navy rifle adopted by the US Navy in 1895. In 1891, Lee sued von Mannlicher, claiming that the latter's design infringed upon his en bloc magazine patent but lost the case.

== Later life ==
James Paris Lee died in Galt, Ontario, Canada on 24 February 1904, having lived to see his rifles in service throughout several colonial conflicts, including the Second Boer War.

On 2 July 1975 a plaque was erected in Municipal Park, now Civic Square Park, Wallaceburg close to the original location of his brother's foundry, stating in part, ... Tradition holds that this [the first firing] occurred at Wallaceburg while Lee was visiting his brother John, a local foundry owner.
