= M1879 Remington–Lee =

Remington–Lee
- Type: Bolt-action rifle
- Place of origin: United States

Service history
- In service: 1885 – 1900(?)
- Used by: See Users
- Wars: Sino-French War; 1895 Counter-Revolution in Hawaii

Production history
- Designer: James Paris Lee
- Designed: 1879
- Manufacturer: Lee Arms Co. Sharps Rifle Manufacturing Company; Remington
- Produced: 1879–1894
- Variants: M1879 Remington-Lee; M1882 Remington-Lee; M1885 Remington-Lee; M1899 Remington-Lee

Specifications
- Caliber: .45-70 Government, .43 Spanish, .30-40 Krag (M1899)
- Action: Bolt-action
- Feed system: 5-round detachable box magazine

The Remington–Lee is a bolt-action, detachable box magazine repeating rifle designed principally by James Paris Lee in the mid-1870s.

== Description ==
It first appeared in 1879, manufactured by the Sharps Rifle Manufacturing Company. Eventually Remington took over production and produced copies in .45-70. Arguably this was the most modern rifle in the world, until the introduction of the 8mm Lebel M1886 rifle using smokeless powder, the Remington-Lee rifle utilized the first successful detachable box magazine, unlike the Lebel rifle which was still using a fixed tubular magazine.

The design was incorporated by the British into the Lee–Metford and Lee–Enfield rifles, thereby becoming one of the most widely used rifle designs of the early to mid-20th century. Remington's version of the Model 1879 saw only limited use by the U.S. Navy and the Model 1882 was tested by U.S. Army and issued on a very limited scale. Ultimately, it was passed up in favor of the Krag–Jørgensen in 1892.

In 1884, China acquired 13,000 Remington-Lees chambered in .43 Spanish (11.15×58mmR). Of these, around 4,000 Model 1882 rifles were rechambered in .43 Spanish. During the Sino-French War they proved to be highly effective against the French Army, which predominantly used the single-shot Gras rifle.

New Zealand purchased 500 for its militia in 1887, also chambered in .43 Spanish. These were quickly replaced after many complaints about the quality of the ammunition.

== Users ==
- Bolivia: Purchased 2,000 Remington-Lee rifles of unknown model in 1891 in .43 Spanish, most likely M1885.
- Cuba: Purchased 3,000 Model 1899 Remington-Lee rifles and Carbines in 1904 in .30-40 Krag
- Haiti: Between 1884 and 1896, Model 1882 Remington-Lee rifles in .43 Spanish were purchased from the New York firm of Schuyler, Hartley & Graham and issued to the Haitian army, gendarmerie and private militias.
- Hawaii: Purchased 350 - 380 M1885 Remington–Lee rifles in 1893 in .45-70 Government for the National Guard of Hawaii shortly following the overthrow of the Hawaiian Monarchy. Used extensively until replacement in 1901 with the Krag-Jorgensen.
- Honduras:Bought 500 M1882 Remington-Lee rifles in 1884 in .43 Spanish from Schuyler, Hartley & Graham
- Peru: Used the M1882 Remington-Lee in .45-70 Government.
- New Zealand: Purchased 500 M1885 Remington–Lee rifles in 1887 in .43 Spanish for the New Zealand Militia.
- Qing Dynasty: Purchased 4,000 M1882 Remington-Lee rifles in 1884 in .43 Spanish.
- United States: Purchased 1,000 M1879 for the US Navy, 750 M1882 for the US Army, and 3,400 M1885 for the US Navy, all in .45-70 Government.

== See also ==
- List of bolt action rifles
