= Springfield Model 1869 =

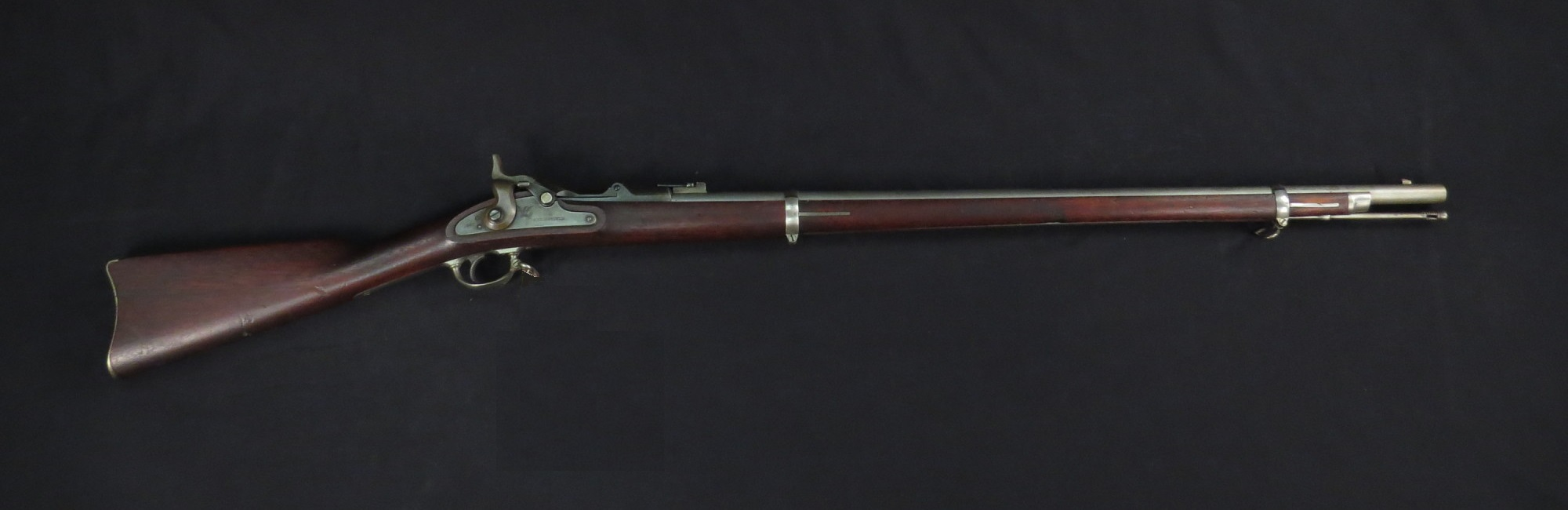
- Type: Breech-loading rifle
- Place of origin: United States

Service history
- Used by: United States

Production history
- Designer: Erskine S. Allin
- No. built: 3400

Specifications
- Cartridge: .50-70-450
- Action: Trapdoor
- Feed system: Breech-loading
- Sights: Open sights

The Springfield Model 1869 was a cadet rifle version of the Springfield Model 1868 trapdoor breechblock service rifle. Made by the Springfield Armory, it featured a shortened 29.5 in (749 mm) barrel in place of the Model 1868’s 32.5 in (826 mm) length.

== History and Design ==
Originally, the trapdoor Springfields were created to convert Springfield Model 1861 and Springfield Model 1863 rifled muskets to breech-loading rifles at a relatively low cost.

The Model 1869 cadet rifle was a shortened version of the Springfield Model 1868. It had a 29.6-inch (75 cm) barrel, compared to the 32.6-inch (83 cm) barrel of the Model 1868, and had an overall length of 48.8 inches (124 cm). The Model 1869 was produced using Model 1868 receivers and breechblocks, but used a stock that was manufactured specifically for the Model 1869. The Model 1869 had a narrower buttplate and the stock, around the barrel was thinner than on the Model 1868.

This model has its own sequence of serial numbers, running from 1 to approximately 3400.

== See also ==
- Springfield rifle
