= Springfield model 1870 Remington—Navy =

Springfield Model 1870
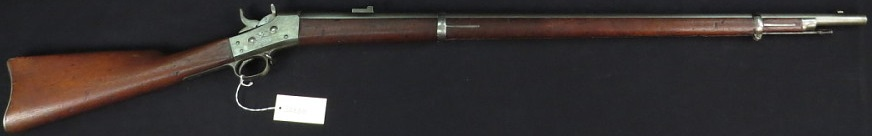
- Type: Breech-loading rifle
- Place of origin: United States

Service history
- Used by: United States; France (limited)
- Wars: Franco-Prussian War

Production history
- Designer: Joseph Rider from Remington Arms Company
- Designed: 1870
- Manufacturer: Springfield Armory
- Produced: 1870
- No. built: Approx. 22,000

Specifications
- Cartridge: .50-70 Government
- Action: Rolling-block
- Rate of fire: User dependent; usually 10 to 12 rounds per minute
- Feed system: Breech-loading
- Sights: Open sights

The Springfield Model 1870 rolling-block U.S. Navy rifle was a shipboard small arm for use by the United States Navy, employing the Remington Arms Company rolling-block design, and manufactured under a royalty agreement with Remington.

Note: Springfield Model 1870 may also refer to the Springfield Model 1870 rifle. One of the rifles which used the trapdoor breechblock design developed by Erskine S. Allin.

== Origin ==
During the U.S. Civil War, Joseph Rider experimented with several breech-loading weapon designs. In 1865, he was issued the first patent for what would evolve into the Remington rolling-block action. The Remingtons continued to invest in Rider's work, and met with Ordnance Department officials in the hope of interesting them in this new design called the "Remington System". The U.S. Navy Ordnance Department became interested in the design, and purchased several different models of rifles from 1867 through 1869. Field trials of these various rifles yielded mostly positive results.

In 1869, the Navy Bureau of Ordnance tested many different weapons, and settled on the .50 caliber Remington Rolling Block for use by both the U.S. Navy and the U.S. Marines. Navy rifles were to be produced with bright barrels, and Marine barrels were to be browned.

The US Navy rifle is compatible with the Springfield Model 1855 bayonet as well as its dedicated sword bayonet.

== Production ==
The U.S. Navy decided to order 10,000 rolling-block rifles. These were to be manufactured at Springfield Armory. After lengthy discussions, it was decided that Springfield Armory would make the complete rifle, and would pay Remington and Sons a $1 royalty for all rifles produced.

After the rifles were produced, Navy inspectors realized that the rear sights had been positioned incorrectly, and were dangerously close to the chamber, making the weapon unsafe for use. All 10,000 rifles were rejected, and were subsequently sold to Poultney and Trimble of Baltimore. These weapons were then exported to France for use during the Franco-Prussian War.

The sale of the defective rifles enabled enough funds to be recovered that the Navy Ordnance Department later ordered 12,000 Model 1870 Type II rifles, which were just a minor improvement to the Model 1870 and included changes such as the correction of the location of the rear sight.

== See also ==
- Springfield rifle
- Springfield Model 1871
- Remington Rolling Block rifle
