= Springfield model 1871 =

Springfield Model 1871
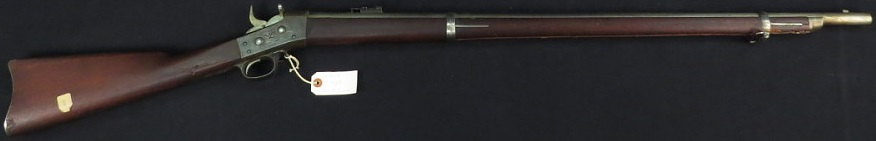
- Type: Breech-loading rifle
- Place of origin: United States

Service history
- Used by: United States; France; Greece; Chile; Argentina; Cuba; Puerto Rico

Production history
- Designer: Originally from Remington Arms Company
- Manufacturer: Springfield Armory
- Produced: 1871 to 1872
- No. built: 10000

Specifications
- Cartridge: .50-70 Government
- Action: Rolling-block
- Rate of fire: User dependent; usually 10 to 12 rounds per minute
- Feed system: Breech-loading
- Sights: Open sights

The Springfield Model 1871 rolling-block U.S. Army rifle was manufactured in 1871–72 by Springfield Armory, using the design originated by Remington Arms Company, under a royalty agreement.

== Origin ==
During the U.S. Civil War, Joseph Rider experimented with several breech-loading weapon designs. In 1865, he was issued the first patent for what would evolve into the Remington rolling-block action.

The Remingtons continued to invest in Rider's work, and met with Ordnance Department officials in the hope of interesting them in this new design called the "Remington System".

The U.S. Navy Ordnance Department became interested in the design, and purchased several different models of rifles from 1867 through 1869. Field trials of these various rifles yielded mostly positive results.

In 1869, the Navy Bureau of Ordnance tested many different weapons, and settled on the .50 caliber Remington Rolling Block for use by both the U.S. Navy and the U.S. Marines. An order was placed for 10,000 Model 1870 rifles. After the rifles were produced, Navy inspectors realized that the rear sights had been positioned incorrectly, and were dangerously close to the chamber, making the weapon unsafe for use. All 10,000 rifles were rejected, and were subsequently sold to France for use in the Franco-Prussian War. The sale of the defective rifles enabled enough funds to be recovered that the Navy Ordnance Department ordered an additional 12,000 rifles.

== Production ==
Following the success of the Model 1870, the Governor of New York ordered 15,000 Remington rifles and bayonets for his state's militia. These Model 1871 rifles were very similar to the Model 1870 rifles, but differed in some details. Field experience with the Model 1870 showed that the mechanism jammed too easily in dusty conditions. Users also did not like loading the weapon at full cock. The Model 1871 included a locking bolt in the breech mechanism. The user pulled the hammer to the full cock position, retracted the breechblock spur to expose the chamber, and inserted the cartridge. When the breechblock closed, the hammer automatically fell to the half cock position, and the weapon could not be fired until the hammer was once again pulled to the full cock position.

Over 20,000 Model 1871 rifles were eventually purchased by the state of New York. The U.S. Army did not greet the Remington rifles with much enthusiasm, despite its superiority to the standard-issue Springfield Model 1870. Foreign sales of the weapon were much more successful. Denmark ordered many of the Model 1870 and Model 1871 rifles. In 1873, Spain ordered 50,000 Model 1871 rifles, which were delivered in 1875. Numerous other countries, such as France, Greece, Chile, Argentina, Cuba, and Puerto Rico also purchased this rifle.

== Notes ==
The Remington rolling block breech-loading rifle design was widely used by many armed forces throughout the world and was widely popular with sportsmen as a hunting rifle, with over 1 million copies manufactured in total.

Remington Model 1871 rifles are specified for the Shield of Arms in the flag of Guatemala. See Flags of the World

== See also ==
- Springfield rifle
- Springfield Model 1870 Remington—Navy
- Remington Rolling Block rifle
