= Springfield model 1870 =

Springfield Model 1870
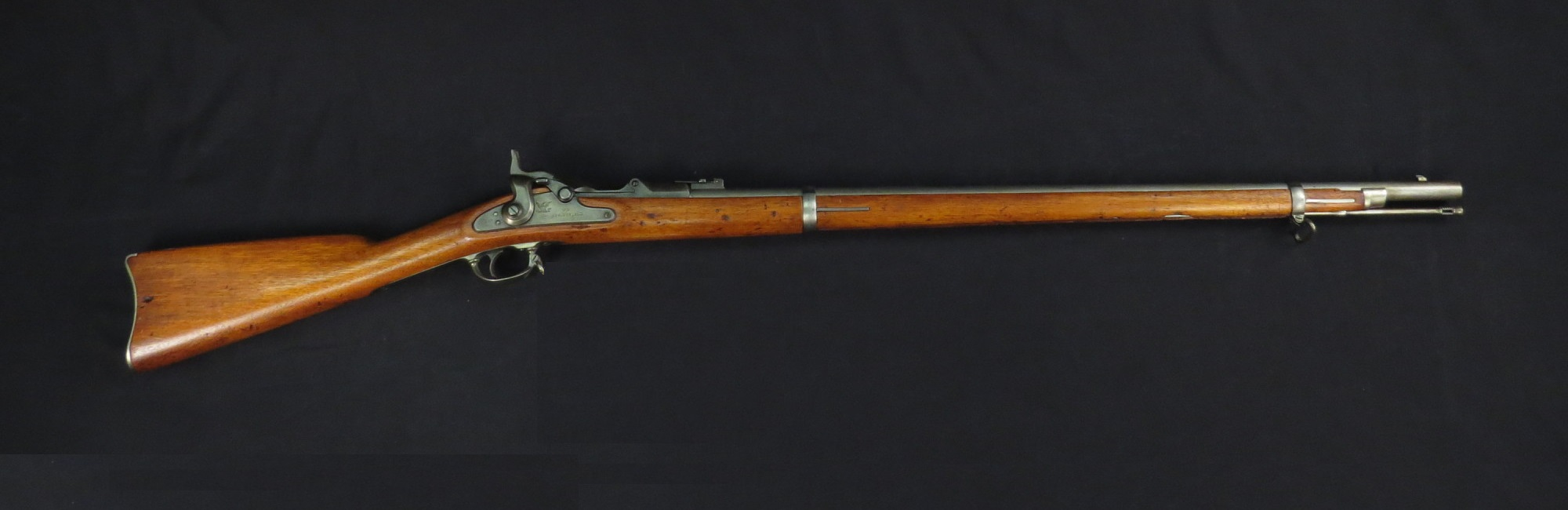
- Type: Breech-loading rifle
- Place of origin: United States

Service history
- In service: 1870–1873
- Used by: United States
- Wars: American Indian Wars

Production history
- Designer: Erskine S. Allin
- Designed: 1870
- Manufacturer: Springfield Armory
- Produced: 1870–1872
- No. built: c. 11,350
- Variants: Carbine

Specifications
- Length: 52 in (1,300 mm)
- Barrel length: 32.6 in (830 mm)
- Cartridge: .50-70-450
- Action: Trapdoor
- Rate of fire: User dependent; usually 8 to 10 rounds per minute
- Feed system: Breech-loading
- Sights: Open sights

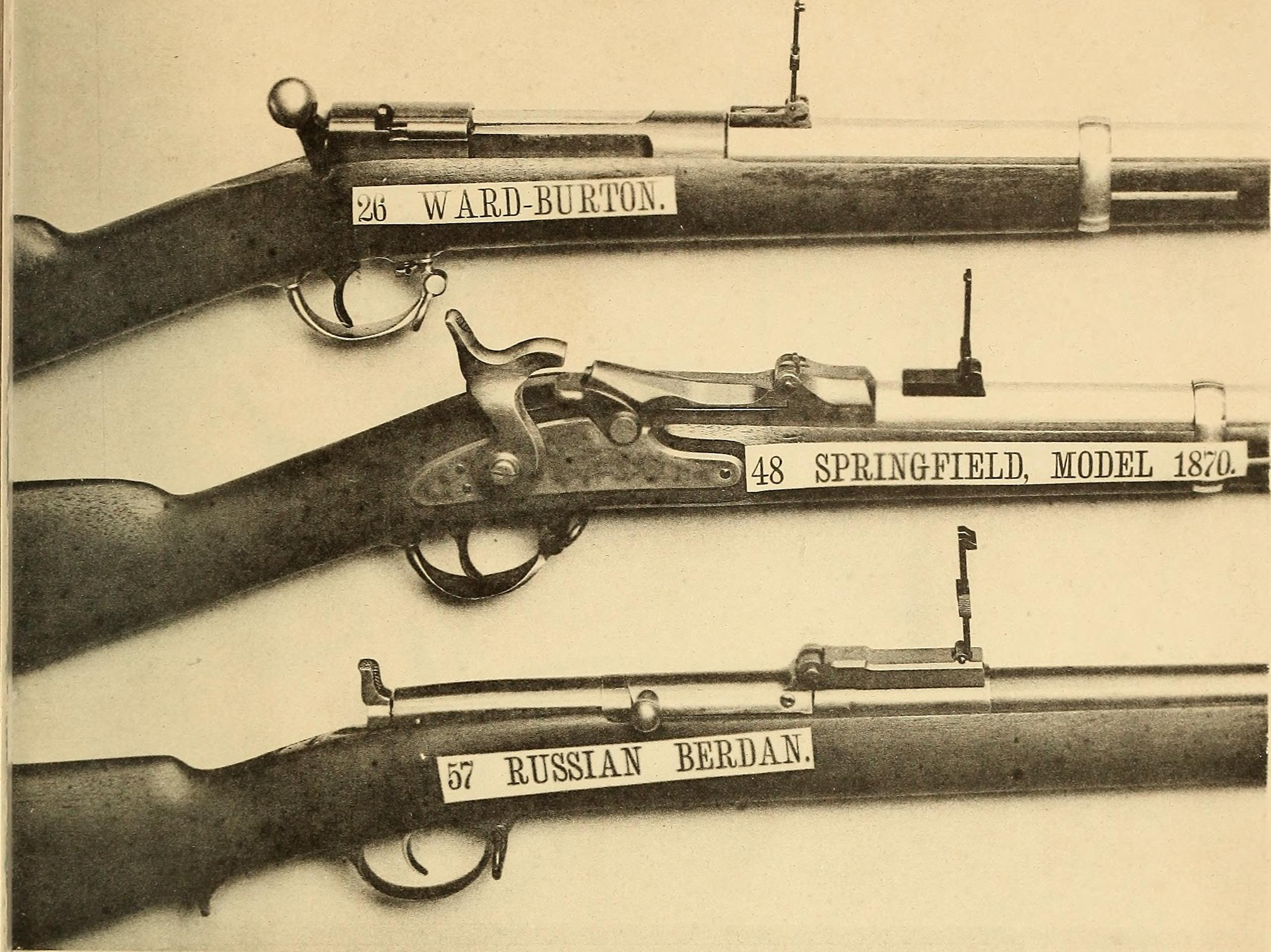
Springfield Model 1870 (center)

The Springfield Model 1870 was a trapdoor breechblock service rifle produced by the Springfield Armory for the United States military. Introduced in 1870, the Model 1870 was a minor improvement to the Springfield Model 1868, and retained most of the Model 1868 rifle features. It was produced in two variants, with the second following in 1871, both chambered for the .50-70-450 cartridge.

Note: Springfield Model 1870 may also refer to the Springfield rolling-block U.S. Navy rifle, employing the Remington Arms Company rolling-block design, and manufactured under a royalty agreement with Remington, for use by the United States Navy as a shipboard small arm.

== Variants ==
The trapdoor Springfields had originally been designed as an inexpensive method of converting Springfield Model 1861 and Springfield Model 1863 rifled muskets into breech-loading rifles, which dramatically improved their rate of fire from about 2 to 3 shots per minute to about 8 to 10 shots per minute.

Designed by armorer Erskine S, Allin, the original trapdoor Springfields had replaced only the firing mechanism, and had used a barrel liner to reduce the caliber from .58 to .50. This barrel liner proved to be unreliable in the field, and later trapdoor Springfields, like the Model 1870, abandoned the barrel liner method and used newly manufactured barrels instead.

There were two versions of the Model 1870, which differed slightly from each other. The first version was produced in 1870 and 1871. The rear sight was improved, and the receiver was shortened to create the Model 1870 receiver. The rear sight on the first Model 1870 was almost against the receiver. 1,000 of these rifles were manufactured.

The second version was produced in 1872 and 1873. In this version the rear sight was moved up so that it was about half an inch away from the receiver. This version also featured a double shouldered cleaning rod, which differed from the first Model 1870 that had used the Model 1868 rifle's cleaning rod. The second version Model 1870 also had a long high arch on the underside of the breechblock, which differed from the first version which had a shorter arch identical to the Model 1868. 10,000 of the second version were manufactured.

A shorter carbine version was also produced in 1871. Approximately 350 of these were manufactured.

The Model 1870, the carbine version as well as both versions of the rifle, used the .50-70-450 cartridge.

== Notable uses ==
Wild Bill Hickok, the famous gunfighter, used a variant of the Model 1870. The "Hickok rifle" has a 29.625-inch (75.25 cm) barrel, which is longer than the carbine version's barrel and shorter than the rifle version's barrel, and also has a Kentucky rifle style sloped butt. The trapdoor mechanism is stamped with the year 1870, and the lockplate is stamped with the year 1863, indicating that this rifle was originally produced as a Model 1863 rifled musket and was later converted as part of the Model 1870 manufacturing. The name "J. B. Hickok" was carved into the stock using a sharp knife. Hickok was buried with this rifle in 1876. However, when he was reburied in Mount Moriah in 1879, someone removed the rifle from his coffin.

== See also ==
- Springfield rifle
  Preceded by Springfield Model 1868	United States military rifle 1870–1873	Succeeded by Springfield Model 1873
