= California Joe =

California Joe may refer to:

- California Joe (military), private, Company C, 1st United States Sharpshooters in American Civil War
- California Joe Milner, American miner and frontier scout
- California Joe (film), American 1943 western
