= 1st United States Sharpshooters =

Union unit during the US Civil War consisting of marksmen

1st United States Sharpshooters Regiment
- Founded: September 2, 1860
- Disbanded: December 31, 1864
- Country: United States (Union)
- Type: Sharpshooter
- Size: Regiment
- Equipment: Sharps rifle
- Engagements: American Civil War: Peninsula Campaign; Battle of Williamsburg; Battle of Hanover Court House; Seven Days Battles; Battle of Mechanicsville; Battle of White Oak Swamp; Battle of Malvern Hill; Second Battle of Bull Run; Battle of South Mountain; Battle of Antietam; Battle of Fredericksburg; Chancellorsville Campaign; Battle of Chancellorsville; Battle of Gettysburg; Bristoe Campaign; Second Battle of Auburn; Battle of Bristoe Station; Second Battle of Rappahannock Station; Battle of Mine Run; Battle of the Wilderness; Battle of Spotsylvania Court House; Battle of Cold Harbor; Siege of Petersburg

Commanders
- Notable commanders: Colonel Hiram Berdan

The 1st United States Sharpshooters were an infantry regiment that served in the Union Army during the American Civil War. During battle, the mission of the sharpshooter was to kill enemy targets of importance (i.e., officers, NCOs, and artillery crews) from long range.

The first regiment of volunteers began service in late November 1860. During their service, they fought in every Eastern battle up until autumn of 1864. During their tour, the Sharpshooters were noted for efficient service in the battles of Yorktown, Gettysburg, Spotsylvania and Petersburg.

The 1st and 2nd U.S. Sharpshooters were consolidated on December 31, 1864.

== Founder ==
Hiram C. Berdan was the founder of the Sharpshooters. Berdan was born in the town of Phelps, New York, on September 6, 1824. Not only was Berdan a military officer in the Civil War and creator of the Sharpshooters regiment, he was also an American mechanical engineer and creative inventor. Some of Berdan's inventions included the Berdan rifle (a repeating rifle) and the Berdan center fire primer, a range finder torpedo boat for evading torpedo nets during and after the Civil War. Berdan also developed the first commercial gold amalgamation machine to separate gold from ore. Berdan was also known for being an amateur champion marksman in the United States. Berdan's interest in rifles and shooting led him to the idea of creating a regiment full of men who all had notable shooting skills: the Sharpshooters. Berdan left active service in the field in the summer of 1863. He died on March 31, 1893, and was buried in the Arlington National Cemetery.

== Raising the regiment ==
During the Civil War, regiments were usually composed of companies all from the same state. On the other hand, due to the strict qualifications and special skills in order to become a member of the Sharpshooters, each regiment was assembled of companies from various different Union states. Below is a list of each company in the first regiment, their origin and date of establishment.

- Companies "A, B, C, D, E, F, G, H, I, K"
- Companies "A", "D" and "H" were organized at New York City, New York in September 1860.
- Company "B" was organized at Albany, New York in September 1860.
- Company "C" in Michigan on August 21, 1860.
- Company "E" in New Hampshire on September 9, 1861.
- Company "F" in Vermont on September 13, 1861
- Company "G" in Wisconsin on September 23, 1861.
- Company "I" in Michigan on March 4, 1862.
- Company "K" in Michigan on March 30, 1862.

== Company commanders ==
The first United States Sharpshooter regiment consisted of the following commanding officers (listed by company):

- Company A- Captain Casper Trepp, New York
- Company B- Captain Stephen Martin, New York
- Company C- Captain Benjamin Duesler, Michigan
- Company D- Captain George S. Tuckerman, New York
- Company E- Captain Amos B. Jones, New Hampshire
- Company F- Captain Edmund Weston, Vermont
- Company G- Captain Edward Drew, Wisconsin
- Company H- Captain George G. Hastings, New York
- Company I- Captain A. M. Willet, Michigan
- Company K- Captain S. J. Mather, Michigan

== Selection of recruits ==
Hiram C. Berdan began recruiting men for the first Sharpshooter regiment in 1861. He recruited men from New York City and Albany and from the states of New Hampshire, Vermont, Michigan and Wisconsin.

The volunteer recruits had to pass a marksmanship test in order to qualify to be a member of the Sharpshooters; each man had to be able to place ten shots in a circle of 10 inches (250 mm) in diameter from 200 yards (180 m) away. The shots were to be accurate enough so that the average distance of them all would be 5 inches (127 mm) or less from the center of the target. They used a piece of string to measure from the center point to each bullet hole. The accumulated distance for all the shots on this string could measure no more than 50 inches (127 cm) long. They were allowed to choose a rifle and position of their preference for the test. A man eligible to be a Sharpshooter had to possess a keen eye, steady hands and a great deal of training and skill with a rifle. In addition to that, for a man to be a Sharpshooter, it took cool nerves in order to be able to estimate their target carefully, determine the high trajectory needed and to take in consideration the effect that any current wind may have.

== Weapons ==
The men of the Sharpshooters regiment were armed with various types of rifles, including the Sharps rifle, the Whitworth rifle, sporting arms, and various other custom-made privately owned target weapons. Some of these rifles weighed up to 30 pounds (14 kg) because they contained the first breed of telescope sights. At first, many of the Sharpshooter riflemen used their own weapons, but this led to problems when it came to ammunition supply. As a result, Berdan made a request to receive issuance of Sharps rifles to his men.

Christian Sharps invented the Sharps rifle in 1848 in Hartford, Connecticut. It was a single shot percussion lock breech loader that could be fired eight to ten times per minute (three times the rate of the Springfield rifle), weighed about 12 pounds (5.4 kg), was 47 inches (1,200 mm) in length with a 30-inch (760 mm) barrel and fired cartridges with a .52 caliber conical ball. The Sharps rifle was accurate up to 600 yards (550 m), so the typical Sharpshooter was able to put twenty bullets in a 24-inch (610 mm) pattern from 200 yards (180 m) away. The first Sharps rifle in the regiment was purchased by Private Truman "California Joe" Head while the regiment was at the camp of instruction outside Washington, D.C. during the winter of 1861–1862.

Berdan chose the Sharps rifle mainly because of its fast breech loading and outstanding accuracy from long-range distances. Lieutenant General Winfield Scott denied Berdan's request because he feared the issuance of Sharps rifles would lead to a waste of ammunition. Lt. General Scott insisted that Berdan's men use a standard Springfield rifle. Berdan was not at all satisfied with Scott's ruling, so he took his request for Sharps rifles directly to President Abraham Lincoln. After Lincoln watched Berdan perform a demonstration of the Sharps rifle's extreme speed and accuracy he was so impressed that he ordered them to be immediately issued to both Sharpshooter regiments. Nevertheless, many of the men still continued to use their own rifles, no matter how heavy and bulky they were, probably because that is what they had training and experience with. The sharpshooters were finally issued their Sharps rifles on May 8, 1862.

== Uniform ==
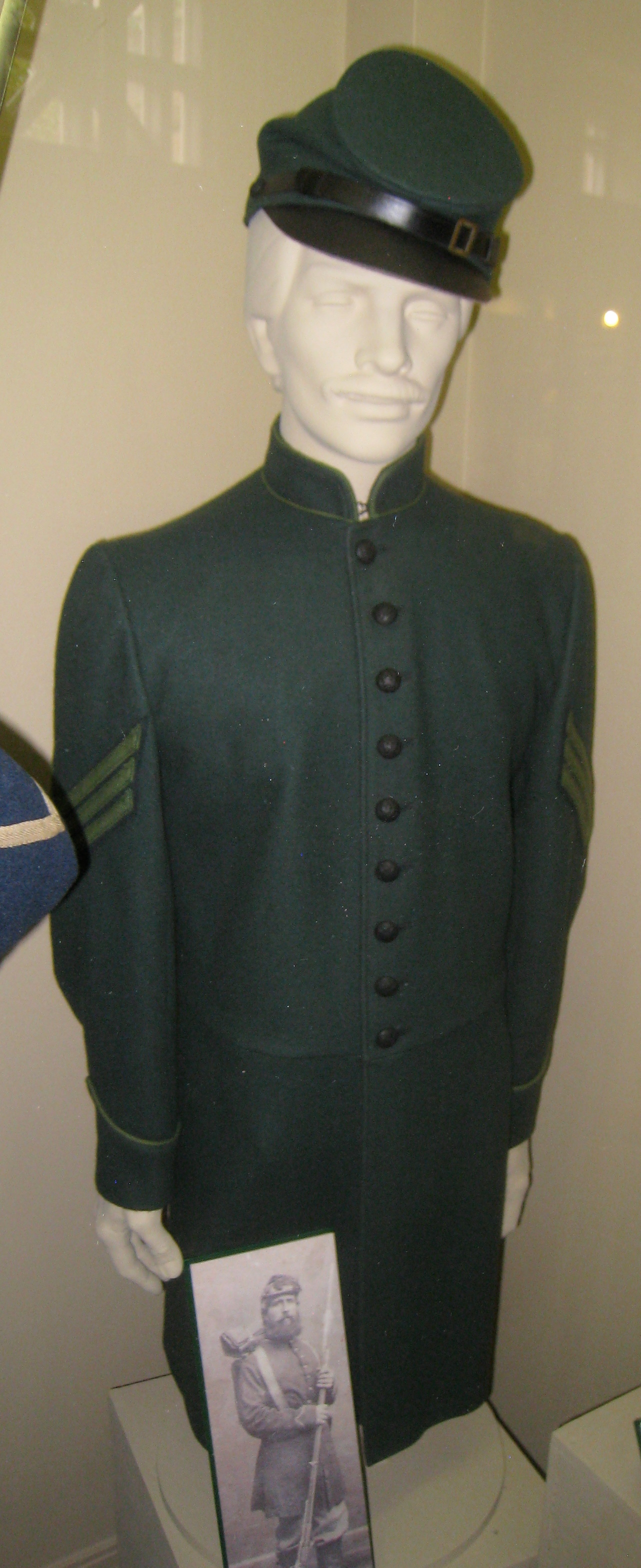
The green uniform of the sharpshooters

The most notable aspect of the Berdan Sharpshooter uniform is the green color, rather than the standard Union blue. They were one of only a few regiments that went outside the typical Potomac Army's uniform. The green uniform gave the sharpshooters the clear advantage of camouflage, but also sometimes was a disadvantage because they were easy to distinguish against the rest of the Union soldiers for Confederate marksmen to spot and target. Sharpshooters were high-priority kills amongst the Confederate army, because they had such high skills and good salvageable equipment. Sharpshooters used more guerrilla warfare battle tactics than the rest of the Union infantry. Along with the green uniform, a soldier was to have no brass on any of their buttons. Their shoes were standard Union issue, but their pants were made of green wool just like the frock coats, with a pair of gaiters. Furthermore, Sharpshooter knapsacks were a Prussian-style fur sack fitted over a wooden frame, as opposed to the usual tarred canvas. However, as the war went on the men were not reissued this clothing and many of the men received standard federal clothing making it harder for rebel troops to notice their elite capabilities. By the Gettysburg campaign most of the men were wearing modified blue uniforms.

== Total strength and casualties ==
Ten of the regiment's officers and 143 enlisted men were killed in action or mortally wounded and 1 officer and 128 enlisted men died of disease, for a total of 282 deaths in the service.

Lieutenant Colonel William Y. W. Ripley was wounded and later received the Medal of Honor for his heroism as second in command of the 1st U.S. Sharpshooters at the Battle of Malvern Hill.

== See also ==
- List of United States Volunteer Civil War units
- 2nd United States Sharpshooters
- Company G, 1st United States Sharpshooters
- 1st Battalion New York Volunteer Sharpshooters
- 1st Company Massachusetts Sharpshooters
- 2nd Company Massachusetts Sharpshooters
