= Springfield Model 1868 =

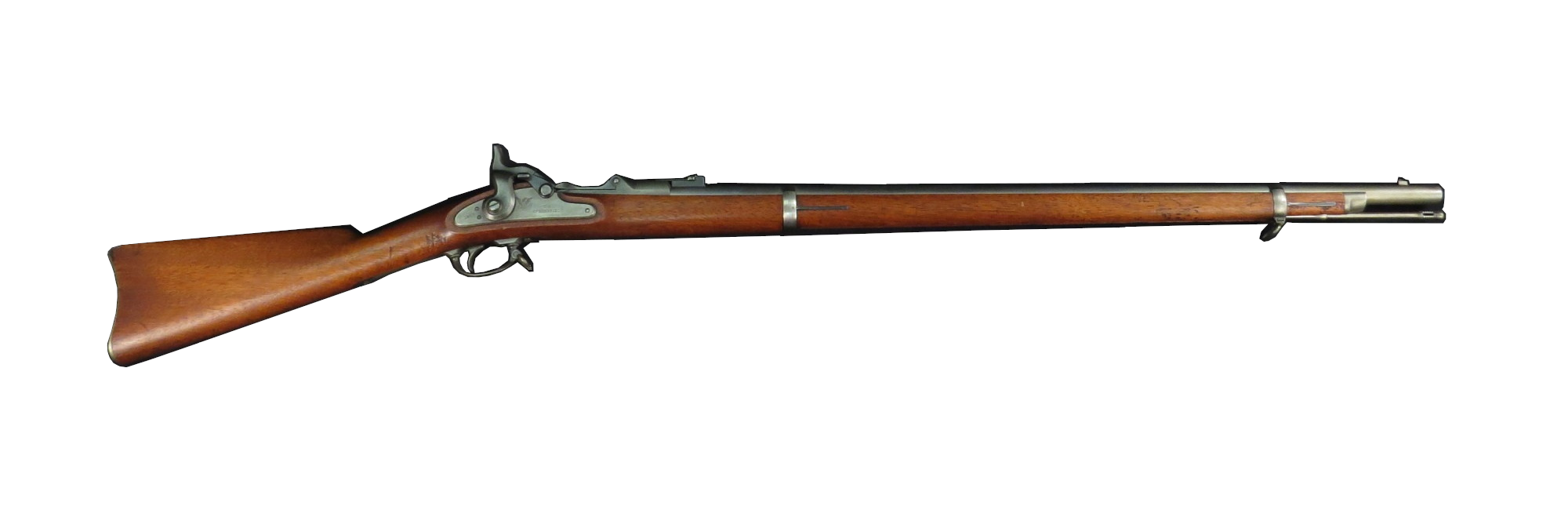
- Type: Breech-loading rifle
- Place of origin: United States

Service history
- In service: 1868–1873
- Used by: United States; France
- Wars: American Indian Wars; Franco-Prussian War

Production history
- Designer: Erskine S. Allin
- Designed: 1868
- Manufacturer: Springfield Armory
- Produced: 1868–1870
- No. built: Approx. 52,000
- Variants: Model 1868 carbine

Specifications
- Length: 52 in (1,300 mm)
- Barrel length: 32.5 in (830 mm)
- Cartridge: .50-70-450
- Action: Trapdoor
- Rate of fire: User dependent; usually 8 to 10 rounds per minute
- Feed system: Breech-loading
- Sights: Open sights

The Springfield Model 1868 was one of the rifles which used the trapdoor breechblock design developed by Erskine S. Allin.

== History and design ==
Originally, the trapdoor Springfields were created to convert Springfield Model 1861 and Springfield Model 1863 rifled muskets to breech-loading rifles at a relatively low cost. This conversion consisted of replacing the percussion lock with the breech-loading trapdoor mechanism, and relining the barrels to convert them from .58 to .50 caliber. This proved problematic, because in the field, the lining tended to separate from the barrel.

To correct this problem, the Model 1868 used a new barrel instead of relining the original older barrel. The new barrel was slightly shorter, 32.6 inches (83 cm), compared to the 36.6-inch (93 cm) barrel used on the Springfield Model 1866. The shorter barrel was affixed using only two barrel bands, instead of the three used on the Model 1866. Since it lacked the middle barrel band, the sling was affixed to the upper barrel band instead. The Model 1868 also differed from previous models in that it used a separate Allin type receiver with the barrel attached to it. The Model 1868 was also the first trapdoor conversion to use the cartridge extractor covered by U.S. Patent No. 68,009, issued August 27, 1867 to W.H. & G.W. Miller. The Model 1868 had an overall length of 52 inches (130 cm).

A Model 1868 carbine version was experimented with, but never went beyond the prototyping stage. The carbine version had a 22.25-inch (56.5 cm) barrel. A cadet rifle version was produced as well designated the Springfield Model 1869.

Over 52,000 Model 1868 rifles were manufactured, chambered for the .50-70-450 cartridge.

This model served as the basis for the definitive Springfield Model 1873 and its series of successors in .45-70-405 caliber, which was adopted as the military longarm of the United States Armed Forces for the next 20 years.

This model is unique in the trapdoor series by being marked with the actual year of manufacture (1868, 1869, or 1870) on the breechblock. The 1868 marking is extremely rare with probably no more than 150 so marked; about 16,000 were marked 1869, with the remaining 36,000 being stamped 1870. As of March 2021, only 21 specimens are known with the 1868 date. Latest to surface is #93, joining earlier finds of #62, #36, #127 & #6.

In the late 1860s and early 1870s, many army units continued to use outdated rifled muskets and other weapons like the Spencer .56 caliber repeating rifle and Sharps .52 caliber percussion rifle. The army wanted to standardize weapons and ammunition, and forced these units to switch to trapdoor Springfields once the Model 1868 went into full production.

A Model 1868 Carbine version was experimented with, but never went beyond the prototyping stage. The Carbine version had a 22 1/4-inch barrel.

In late 1870, France purchased 20,640 Model 1868 rifles to be used in the ongoing Franco-Prussian War.

== See also ==
- Springfield rifle

Preceded by Springfield Model 1866	United States military rifle 1868–1870	Succeeded by Springfield Model 1870
