= Company G, 1st United States Sharpshooters =

- Active: September 23, 1861 – December 31, 1864
- Disbanded: December 31, 1864
- Country: United States
- Allegiance: Union
- Branch: Infantry
- Size: Company
- Equipment: Sharps rifle
- Engagements: American Civil War: Peninsular Campaign; Second Battle of Bull Run; Battle of Antietam; Battle of Fredericksburg; Battle of Chancellorsville; Battle of Gettysburg; Battle of the Wilderness; Battle of Spotsylvania Court House; Battle of Cold Harbor; Siege of Petersburg

Company G, 1st U.S. Sharpshooters was an infantry company that served in the Army of the Potomac during the American Civil War. The unit is sometimes unofficially referred to as the 1st Wisconsin Sharpshooters.

== Organization ==
At the onset of the war, the United States Department of War charged Colonel Hiram Berdan, a known marksman, with the organization of two regiments of true marksmen, with the volunteers belonging to companies of their respective states. Company G was organized and recruited in Wisconsin under the supervision of Adjutant General William L. Utley, who was also a noted marksman and was crucial to the expedited process of organizing and mustering Wisconsin volunteer regiments. Berdan had the men issued green uniforms for a better blend into the wilderness, along with a distinction from the rest of the army wearing variations of blue. He also continuously petitioned the War Department for the issue of the Sharps Breechloading Rifle, versus the usual Springfield Rifle of Army issue. On September 19, 1861 the unit moved out from Camp Randall to rendezvous with the 1st United States Sharpshooters and were officially mustered into Federal service on September 23, 1861 in New York City.

== Service ==
At camp in Washington D.C., Company G along with the rest of the 1st U.S.S. practiced rigorous marksmanship drills; dignitaries and citizens alike could come watch the amazing feats the marksmen accomplished.

== See also ==
- List of United States Volunteer Civil War units
- List of Wisconsin Civil War units
- Sharpshooter

== Sources ==
- Quiner, E.B. Military History of Wisconsin. 1866. Clark & Co. Chicago, Il. 871-880. Print.
- Wisconsin State Historical Society. www.wisconsinhistory.org
