= List of United States Volunteers units in the American Civil War =

While the vast majority of number of volunteer units during the American Civil War were enlisted by the states, a small number were enlisted directly by the Federal government. These units included regiments like Hiram Berdan's U.S. Sharpshooters and "Galvanized Yankees" recruited from Confederate prisoners of war recruited to fight Indians on the frontier rather than remain in prison camps.

== Sharpshooters ==
- 1st United States Volunteer Sharpshooter Regiment
  - Company G, 1st United States Sharpshooters
- 2nd United States Volunteer Sharpshooter Regiment
- Birge's Western Sharpshooters (variously known as: "Birge's WSS" from Nov 1861-March 1862; "WSS-14th Missouri Vols" from March 1862- late 1862; and "66th IL Vol Inf (WSS)" from late 1862-July 7 1865. Were initially sworn into service as a non-State aligned unit, as the 1st & 2nd USVSS were, under the personal authority of MG Fremont, Commander of the Dept of the West (placing the regiment in de facto direct U.S. service). Fremont was later found to have exceeded his authority by directly commissioning the Sharpshooters without the authority of the President or a State Governor. In March 1862 they were assigned to the control of the State of Missouri, and the officers were given Missouri commissions. Later the unit was transferred to the control of the state of Illinois as the 66th Illinois Volunteer Infantry Regiment.

== Infantry ==
- 1st United States Volunteer Infantry Regiment
- 2nd United States Volunteer Infantry Regiment
- 3rd United States Volunteer Infantry Regiment
- 4th United States Volunteer Infantry Regiment
- 5th United States Volunteer Infantry Regiment
- 6th United States Volunteer Infantry Regiment

== Others ==
- 1st Regiment, U.S. Veteran Volunteer Engineers
- 1st Company, U.S. Volunteer Pontoneers

== See also ==
- Lists of American Civil War Regiments by State
