= Remington Naval Model 1865 Pistol =

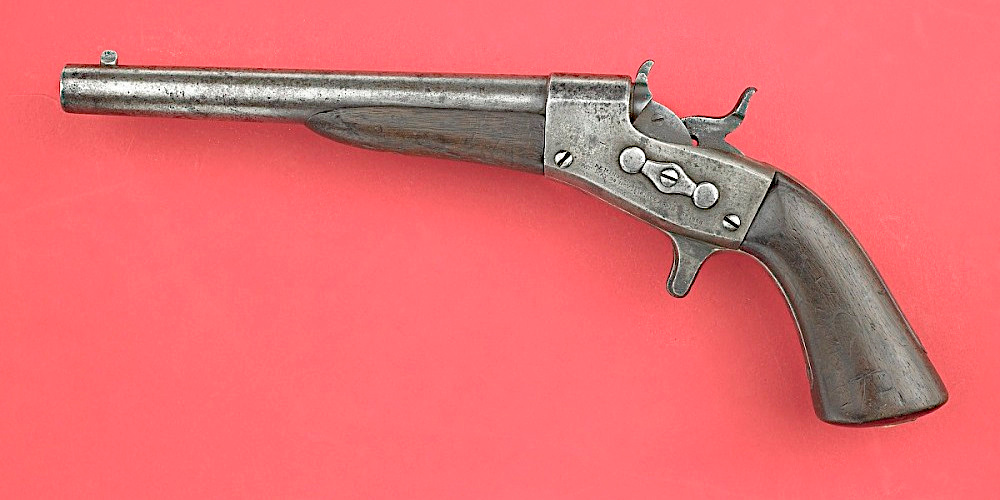
- Type: Pistol
- Place of origin: United States

Service history
- Used by: United States; Second French Empire
- Wars: Franco-Prussian war

Production history
- Designer: Joseph Rider
- Designed: 1865
- Manufacturer: Remington Arms Company
- Produced: 1866–1870
- No. built: approx. 6,500

Specifications
- Cartridge: .50
- Action: Rolling block
- Feed system: 1-round
- Sights: Iron sights

The Remington Naval Model 1865 is a pistol designed by Joseph Rider and manufactured by Remington Arms since 1866 in .50 caliber.

== History ==
Remington Arms Company provided the Remington Model 1865 pistol was part of a contract to manufacture approximately 6,500 rolling block pistols for the U.S. Navy between 1866 and 1870.

== In popular culture ==
In the Star Trek episode "The Squire of Gothos", Captain Kirk is forced to fight a duel with Squire Trelane. The dueling pistols were a boxed pair of Model 1865 rolling block pistols.
