= Trapdoor mechanism =

Method of reloading and firing a single-shot rifle

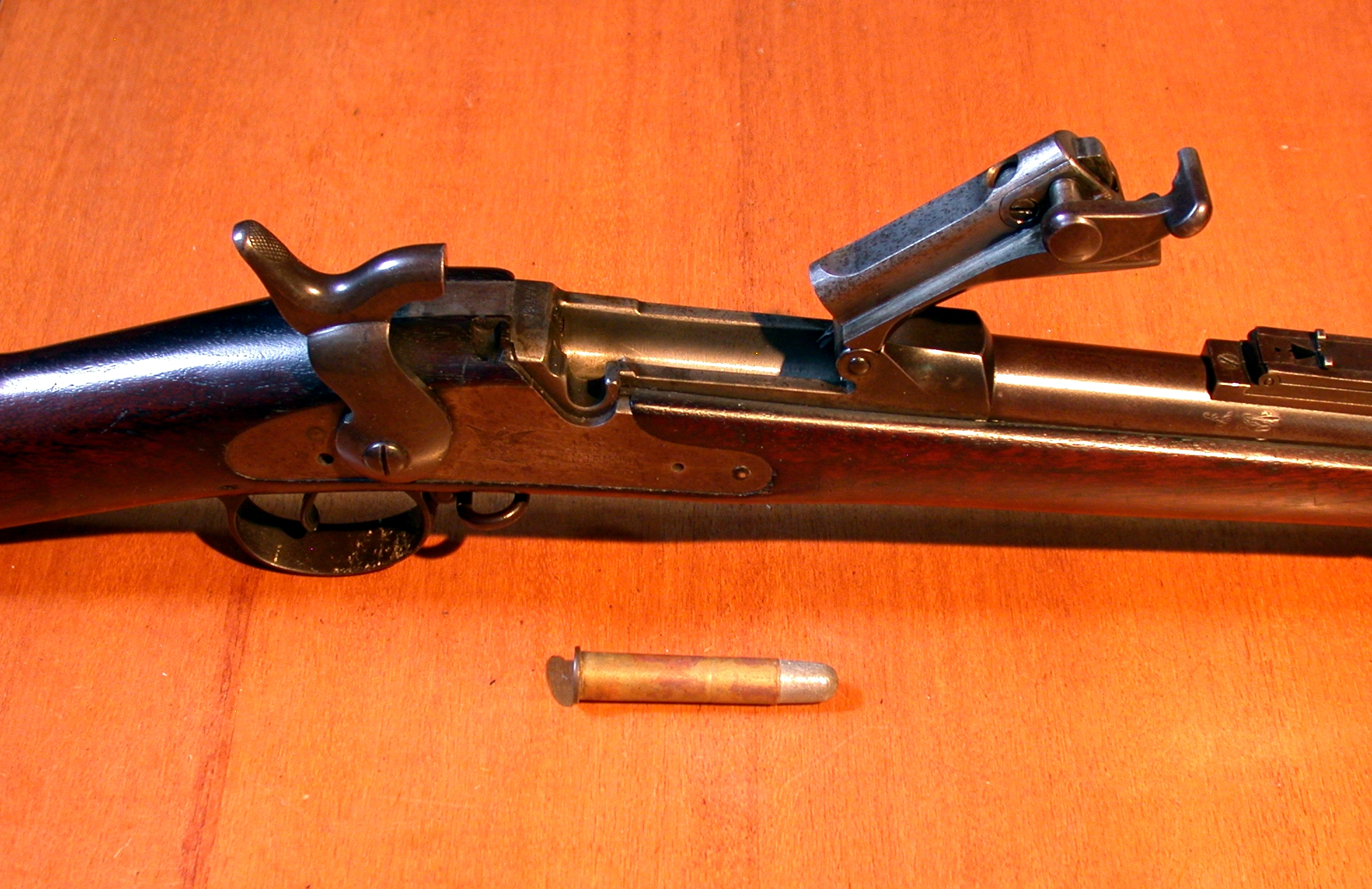
Springfield Model 1888, trapdoor mechanism open

In firearms, a trapdoor is a form of breech-loading mechanism for rifles in which a hinged breechblock rotates up and forward, resembling the movement of a trapdoor. The Springfield models 1865 and 1873 were best known for first employing this type of action.

== Background ==
With the end of the American Civil War, the United States Army was downsized alongside with budget cuts. At the same time, settlers began migrating in large numbers to the West, resulting in encounters with often-hostile native American tribes, and the Army was responsible for protecting the settlers.

Military planners drawing from the lessons taken from the Civil War, concluded that breechloaders could partially compensate the numerical inferiority of the US Army; while the cavalry had some Spencer repeating rifles, the infantry had no comparable rifles capable of handling more powerful metallic cartridges and with Congress unwilling to fund the purchase of new rifles when tens of thousands of serviceable muzzleloaders were stored in government warehouses, the Springfield Armory was tasked with devising a method to convert a rifled musket into a breechloading rifle.

During US Army trials of 1865–1866, Hiram Berdan submitted a trapdoor design of his own, but it was rejected in favor of the prototype developed by Erskine S. Allin of the Springfield Armory, which could be fitted into Springfield Model 1861 muskets. These modifications cost about $5 ($105.16 in 2025) per rifle, which was a fraction of the cost of a brand new rifle. A .58 caliber rimfire cartridge was also developed to allow the original barrel to be used without modification or replacement; Patent No. 49,959 was issued to Allin on September 19, 1865, describing the design.

== Design ==
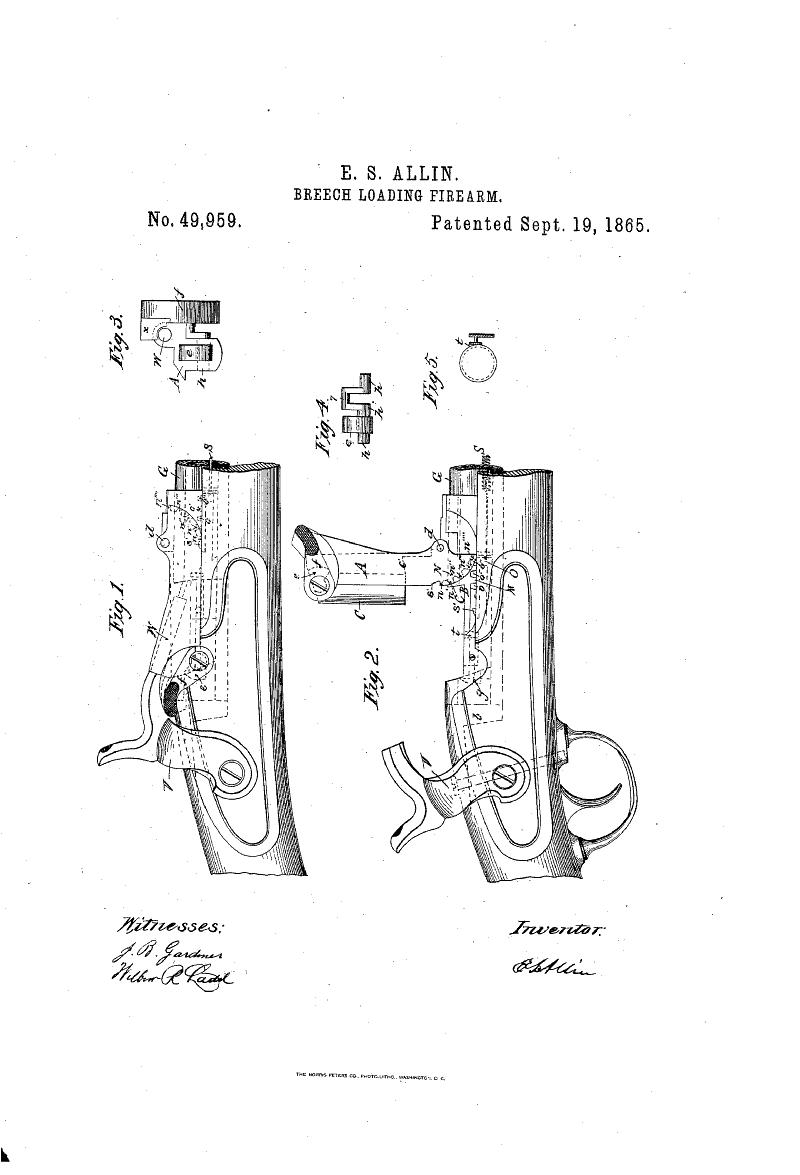
Drawing from Erskine S. Allin's patent for the Springfield Model 1865's trapdoor mechanism.

The trapdoor mechanism employed a hinged breechblock that rotated up and forward, resembling the movement of a trapdoor, to open the breech of the rifle and permit insertion of a cartridge. The hinged breechblock caused the Springfield conversions to be named "Trapdoor Springfields".

=== First Allin-pattern ===
The conversion from musket to breechloader was done by milling open the barrel's breech section and inserting a hinged trapdoor fastened to the top of the barrel. A thumb-operated cam latch at the rear of the breechblock held it shut when in closed position. The rack-type system extractor was withdrawn automatically as the breechblock was opened and snapped back at the end of its stroke. The firing pin was housed within the breechblock while the old hammer was replaced with a new one.

While Allin's basic design was sound, it required 56 different machining operations to produce the breechblock alongside milling the rear portion of the barrel, making the conversion process excessively time-consuming; the breechblock mechanism was too complicated and had a tendency to rattle, the extractor was weak, while the .58 cartridge performed poorly. After 5,000 Model 1861 muskets were converted, work began on a simplified version.

=== Second Allin-pattern ===
After evaluating the Springfield Model 1865, the Ordnance Department began working on an improved version of the Allin-pattern to convert the Springfield Model 1863 musket. The resulting Springfield Model 1866 used a simplified and more reliable breechblock while the barrel was reamed out to .64 in (16 mm) to take a liner chambered for the .50-70 cartridge. An 'U'-spring extractor replaced the original ratchet mechanism.

Hiram Berdan later claimed that the Model 1866 used his mechanism and filed a lawsuit that dragged on until 1895, when the US Government paid a sum of $95,000 ($3.68 million in 2025) to Berdan's estate for infringement of US patent No. 52,925 of February 1866.

=== Morse-pattern ===
The Morse alteration musket represented the inaugural early breechloading metallic-cartridge firearm produced at the Springfield Armory in 1859. This initiative converted existing .69-caliber muzzle-loading muskets into breechloaders, utilizing Morse’s patented “reverse trapdoor” mechanism, which featured a breechblock that opened upward and rearward, distinguishing it from subsequent Allin conversions. These modifications maintained the original barrel length while integrating rifling, updated sights, and a sophisticated breech assembly.

George Washington Morse subsequently assisted the Confederacy in developing a proprietary carbine utilizing a tilting breechblock mechanism.

=== Berdan-pattern ===
After his trapdoor design was rejected in the US Army trials, Hiram Berdan worked with Russian officers Alexander Gorlov and K. U. Gunius on the Berdan rifle for the Imperial Russian Army.

The Model 1869 rifle (also known as the Berdan No .1) used Berdan's hinged breechblock while the sliding striker (which locked the breech and detonated the primer) was similar in concept to the Chassepot and Albini-Braendlin rifles. The striker had to be pulled back and cocked before the trapdoor could be opened.

=== Other patterns ===
Other trapdoor designs include a 1866 patent by Isaac M. Milbank, and the Albini-Braendlin.

== Adoption ==
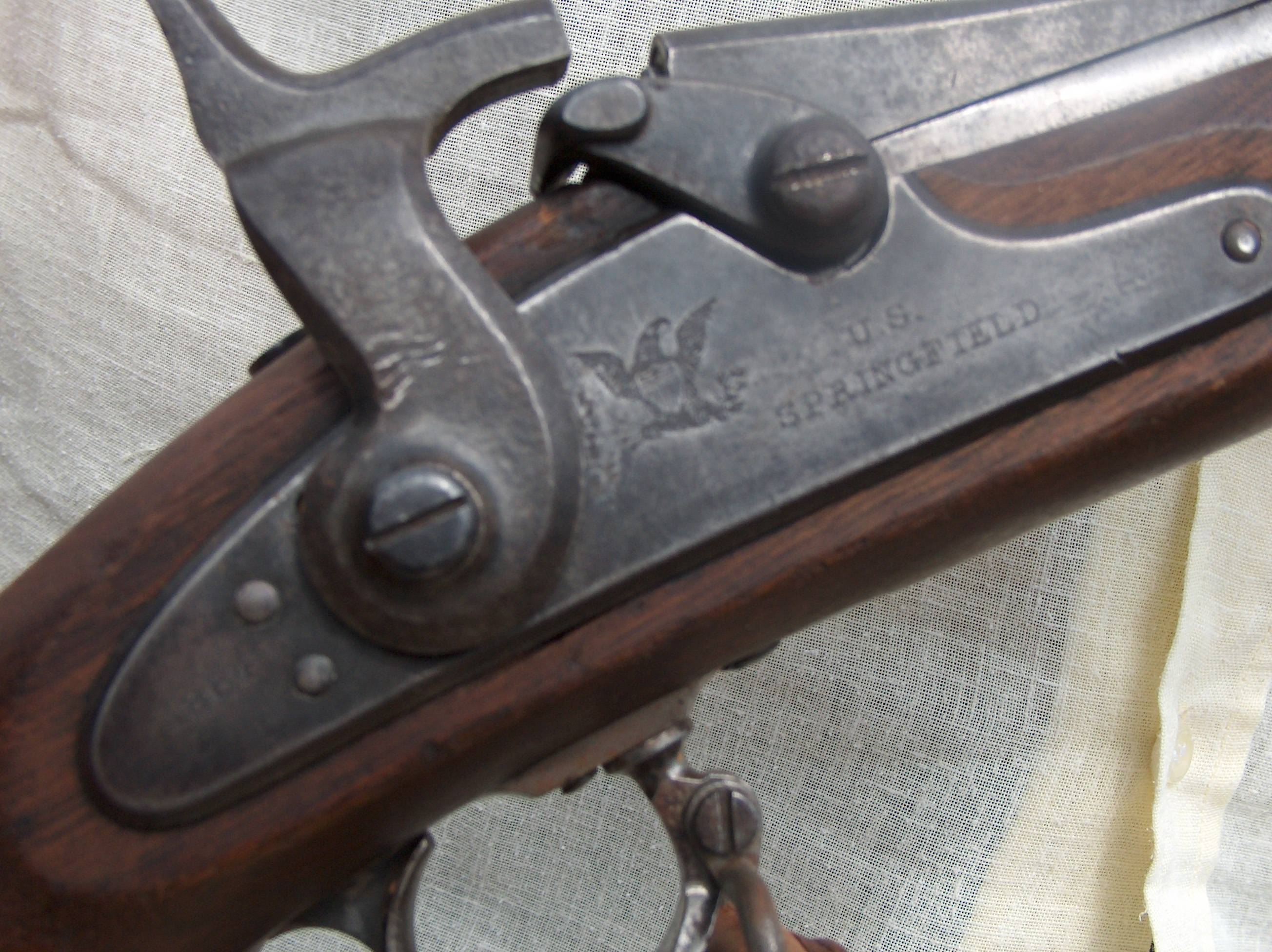
Springfield Model 1866, trapdoor breech closed

=== United States ===
After the Model 1865 and 1866 conversions, the Springfield Armory began manufacturing brand new rifles using the trapdoor mechanism starting with the Model 1868; Despite opposition from General William T. Sherman, who favored the Remington Rolling Block, the Trapdoor Springfield performed well during trial and testing alongside the Remington rifle. Improved versions of the Trapdoor Springfields were produced until 1893, seeing action during the American Indian Wars, and the Spanish–American War.

The Allin-pattern remained standard of the US Army until the introduction of the Krag–Jørgensen rifle in the early 1890s. Surviving rifles and carbines were gradually passed on to the National Guard remaining in service until c. 1905. Remaining guns in government warehouses after World War I were kept in storage for state militias until the early 1920s.

=== Other countries ===
The Austrians initially adopted needle-fire system for the M1854/67 Wänzl Infanteriegewehr but chose their own trapdoor design.

The Albini-Braendlin rifle was adopted by the Royal Italian Navy in 1866 and the Belgian military in 1867, while Milbank's trapdoor design was modified by Professor Amsler of Schaffhausen and used to convert the Swiss Army inventory of muzzleloaders. Belgians later incorporated a sliding bolt and trapdoor system for the Merckelbagh.

A slightly modified Berdan-pattern trapdoor was adopted in 1867 by Spain to convert their caplock rifles to use metallic cartridges. Spain refitted the M1857, M1858, and later M1857/59 capping breechloader rifles, which were essentially copies of the .58 caliber P1853 rifle. These rifles were based on the British Enfield series and were designed to meet the needs of the Spanish military during a time of political turmoil and military reform. The M1857/59 rifles featured a screw-tightened clamping barrel band and a British-style rear sight.

A heavily modified version of Hiram Berdan's trapdoor mechanism was used on the Berdan No. 1 rifle manufactured by Colt and sold to the Russian Empire in 1869, though it was replaced the next year by the Berdan No. 2 rifle, which used a bolt action instead. Both models were used by the Imperial Russian Army during the Russo-Turkish War (1877–1878).

During the Franco-Prussian War, the US government sold a total of 25,281 obsolete Springfield Model 1866 rifles to the French chambered for the .50-70 cartridge. The French also purchased 11,188 Spanish trapdoor conversions chambered for the 11 mm Spanish cartridge.

As settlers migrated west, many sought affordable, utilitarian firearms for hunting small game and general frontier use. Surplus Allin-pattern "Trapdoor" rifles, no longer needed by the Army, were often converted into single-shot shotguns, providing a low-cost option for people with limited means. They became common among homesteaders and travelers on the frontier. A similar phenomenon occurred with surplus British Snider-Enfield rifles. These were also converted into inexpensive shotguns and widely sold under the trade name “Zulu,” marketed to settlers and farmers in need of a basic, low-cost firearm.

== In fiction ==
Rifles with this mechanism feature prominently in the 1952 film Springfield Rifle, which has the tagline "The Gun...The Girl...They Made One Man The Equal Of Five!" Thieves stealing horses for the Confederates try to capture a shipment of the rifles, and the protagonist is tasked with stopping them.

== See also ==
- M1867 Russian Krnka, side-henge rifle originated design from Austria-Hungary
- Infanteriegewehr Modell 1842, earlier trapdoor action gun
