= 1st Battalion New York Volunteer Sharpshooters =

1st Battalion, New York Sharpshooters
- State Flag of New York (1778-1901)
- Active: September 13, 1861 - July 10, 1865
- Country: United States of America
- Allegiance: New York; Union
- Branch: United States Army
- Type: Volunteer Unit
- Role: Sharpshooters
- Size: 500 total
- Part of: Army of the Potomac
- Equipment: Sharps rifle .52 cal
- Engagements: American Civil War: Siege of Suffolk; Dix's Peninsula Campaign; Bristoe Campaign; Mine Run Campaign; Overland Campaign; Siege of Petersburg; Appomattox Campaign

Commanders
- Notable commanders: Maj. William S. Rowland

The 1st Battalion New York Volunteer Sharpshooters was a battalion of sharpshooters in the Union Army during the American Civil War. Fighting in the Eastern Theater it was attached to the 1st United States Sharpshooters.

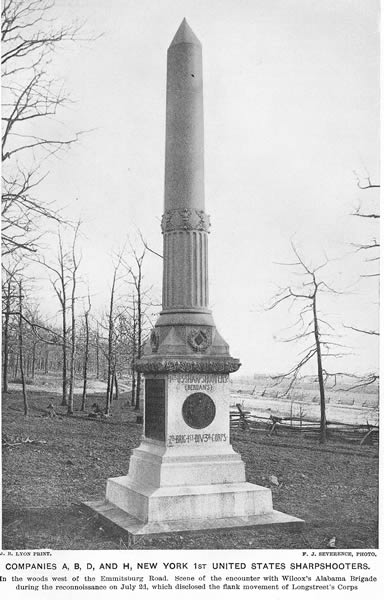
The 1st NY Sharpshooter Battalion's monument at Gettysburg

== History ==
Major William S. Rowland received authority from the War Department to recruit a regiment of sharpshooters in the States of New York and Pennsylvania on October 10, 1862. When the regimental organization failed in sufficient numbers a battalion was organized into four companies, the 6th, 7th, 8th and 9th. A tenth company was considered, but never created.

== Company Commanders and Recruiting areas ==
6th Company, Flank Company, L 108 N. Y. Volunteers: Captain Abijah C. Gray - Rochester - Mustered for three years on September 13, 1862

7th Company, Company L, 112th N. Y. Volunteers: Captain Joseph S. Arnold, Captain Clinton Perry - Elicottt, Kian-tone, Busti, Ellington, Ellery, Carroll and Jamestown

8th Company: Captain Edward G. Robinson - Buffalo, Hudson and Chatham

9th Company: Captain Thomas S. Bradley - Albany, Hudson, Canaan, Hinsdale and New Lebanon

10th Company - Capt. Charles M. White - organized January 13, 1863; was originally intended for a service of nine months, on April 21, 1863 the term of service was changed to three years; the company was not completed and the enlisted men were transferred

== Casualties ==
Out of a total of 157 casualties, the regiment suffered 27 men killed or mortally wounded, 68 officers and men wounded but recovered, and 62 officers and men missing in action .

== See also ==
- 1st United States Sharpshooters
- List of New York Civil War regiments
