= Springfield Rifle (film) =

1952 film

- Theatrical release poster
- Directed by: Andre de Toth
- Written by: Frank Davis; Charles Marquis Warren
- Based on: Story by Sloan Nibley
- Produced by: Louis F. Edelman
- Starring: Gary Cooper
- Cinematography: Edwin B. DuPar
- Edited by: Robert L. Swanson
- Music by: Max Steiner
- Color process: WarnerColor
- Production company: Warner Bros. Pictures
- Distributed by: Warner Bros. Pictures
- Release date: October 7, 1952 (Springfield, Massachusetts)
- Running time: 93 minutes
- Country: United States
- Language: English
- Box office: $4.9 million (U.S. rentals)

Springfield Rifle is an American Civil War Western film directed by Andre de Toth and starring Gary Cooper, Phyllis Thaxter and Lon Chaney Jr.

The titular rifle is the trapdoor Springfield Model 1865.

== Plot ==
The Union army in the American Civil War is in desperate need of new horses. A Confederate spy in Colorado has been informing freeboot horse rustlers of the timing and route of herds being driven by the Union army, enabling the horses to be seized and resold to the South. Charged with cowardice when he abandons his herd, Major Lex Kearney is expelled from the Union army with a dishonorable discharge and a yellow streak painted down his back. His wife Erin informs him that their son has run away in shame.

Kearney is baited by his archenemy Captain Tennick into trespassing on Army premises, invoking the death penalty. In the brig with captured raiders Austin McCool and Pete Elm, Kearney aids their escape and accompanies them to the main hideout. An ambush is prepared with the goal of killing McCool to remove the actual head of the operation. As arranged, Tennick kills McCool but dies in the process, stranding Kearney without a contact man. He continues his ruse, entering into a business partnership with Elm.

A shipment of the new rapid breach-loading Springfield Model 1865 rifles is due, offering a five-to-one potential firepower advantage for the Union troops. The rustlers are notified of the pending arrival. Kearney has accepted a fake discharge so that he can execute a top-secret undercover assignment as a Union counterintelligence agent to find the rustlers and the spy who has been giving them the information.

The chief traitor is Colonel Hudson, the Union fort commandant, who has always been sympathetic to Kearney and his wife. Discovering Kearney's role, Hudson orders the murder of everyone who knows the truth of his role and frames Kearney for treason. Sympathizers at the fort help Kearney escape, and together they hijack the Springfield rifle shipment for the showdown with the horse thieves. Elm is killed and Kearney attempts to capture Hudson alive to face military justice.

== Cast ==
- Gary Cooper as Major Alex "Lex" Kearney
- Phyllis Thaxter as Erin Kearney
- David Brian as Austin McCool
- Paul Kelly as Lt. Col. John Hudson
- Philip Carey as Capt. Tennick
- Lon Chaney Jr. as Pete Elm
- James Millican as Matthew Quint
- Guinn 'Big Boy' Williams as Sgt. Snow
- Alan Hale Jr. as Mizzell
- Martin Milner as Pvt. Olie Larsen
- Wilton Graff as Col. George SharpeRest
- Fess Parker (uncredited) as Confederate Sgt. Jim Randolph
- Ralph Sanford as Barfly (uncredited)
- Fred Kelsey as Barfly (uncredited)
- Michael Chapin as Kearney's Son (uncredited)

== Release ==
The film's world premiere was held at two theaters in Springfield, Massachusetts on October 7, 1952. Festivities included a parade and a "Miss Springfield" pageant, and some of the film's stars attended.

== Reception ==
Reviewer W. Harley Rudkin of the Springfield Daily News reviewed the film the day after the premiere and wrote: "The Charles Warren-Frank Davis screenplay meanders through a series of Warnercolor sequences, but it seldom catches the attention, and, when it does, it can't hold it. Director Andre de Toth probably did the best he could with what he had, but the overall effect is desultory in the extreme, which is sort of disappointing. It was like having a big birthday party, with all the guests present, and no cake to give them."
