= Truman Head =

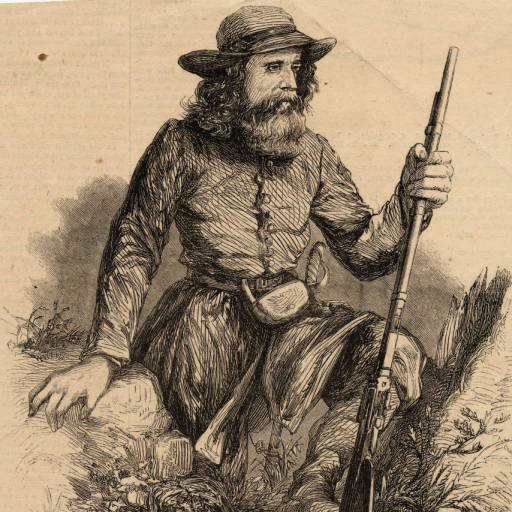
- California Joe with privately purchased Sharps rifle
- Born: 1809; Otsego County, New York, US
- Died: November 24, 1875 (aged 65–66); San Francisco, California, US
- Burial place: San Francisco National Cemetery
- Military career
- Allegiance: United States
- Branch: Union Army
- Rank: Private
- Nickname: California Joe
- Unit: 1st U.S. Sharpshooters Regiment
- Conflicts: American Civil War

Private Truman Head, commonly known as "California Joe" (1809 – November 24, 1875) was a famous member of the 1st United States Sharpshooters during the American Civil War. He served under inventor Colonel Hiram Berdan.

== Early life ==
Truman Head was born in Otsego County, New York in 1809. He left home after he fell in love with a young lady, but was rejected as a suitor by her father. He spent several years supporting himself as a hunter and fur trapper before heading to California when gold was discovered in 1849.

== Military career ==
On our campground (Yorktown, Virginia) was the celebrated tree in which the rebel darkey sharp-shooter was shot by "California Joe." It then lay on its side, twenty-one feet in circumference and hollow, and was used by our regiment for a guard-house.

When the Civil War broke out, he headed East to join the fight at age 52. His original intention was to join the California Regiment of Colonel Baker, but upon finding that regimental drill did not suit his temperament, he decided to join the Sharpshooters under Colonel Berdan. Upon demonstrating his skills, he was accepted into Company C of the 1st US Sharpshooters, being formally enlisted on September 14, 1861. While the regiment was at the Camp of Instruction near Washington, D.C. over the winter of 1861-62, he purchased a Sharps rifle for himself. This was the first Sharps in the regiment, and was the envy of his comrades until their own government-furnished Sharps arrived in May 1862. Since Head had no family, he had left his gold mining fortune of $50,000 in a trust for his fellow soldiers in case he was killed in action.

The first widely distributed stories about him began to circulate during the siege of Yorktown, Virginia – a battle in which more than one publication credited him with "the first Rebel slain" in the siege. A large cannon (a 32 pounder) had been brought to the field of battle by the Rebels, and "California Joe" and some comrades were ordered to silence it. They found positions between the lines, and when morning came, Joe watched as the gun crew began to prepare the weapon for loading. As a cannonier cautiously approached with a swab-rammer to clean the barrel, the marksman touched his trigger, and the first victim of Yorktown fell. The swab remained in the barrel, and for the remainder of the day Joe and his companions picked off any rebel who attempted to remove the swab.

Another tale describes how "a small mounted party, led by an officer wearing a white shirt" ventured outside the rebel fortifications. Joe commented that he was "best at a white mark". He quickly aimed and fired, and the man in the saddle fell to the ground, apparently dead.

Around August 1862, Joe began having difficulty with his eyes due to frequent use of the telescopic sight attached to his rifle. He determined to take his appeal to the highest authority in the land, and boldly addressed a letter to President Lincoln: "Mr. Lincoln: – I have done some service to the country, and my eyesight is ruined doing duty. I would like to be discharged. California Joe." Shortly thereafter, he received his discharge.

== Later life ==
Upon returning to California, Truman Head took a position as a customs inspector for the port of San Francisco. He died on November 24, 1875, and was buried in the GAR plot at Mountain View Cemetery. Military honors, including a 21-gun salute, were provided by a detachment from the San Francisco Cadets, Company H, Second Infantry, led by Corporal P. Hanna. On January 31, 1933, he was reinterred at the San Francisco National Cemetery at the Presidio.
