= Berdan rifle =

Berdan rifle No. 2
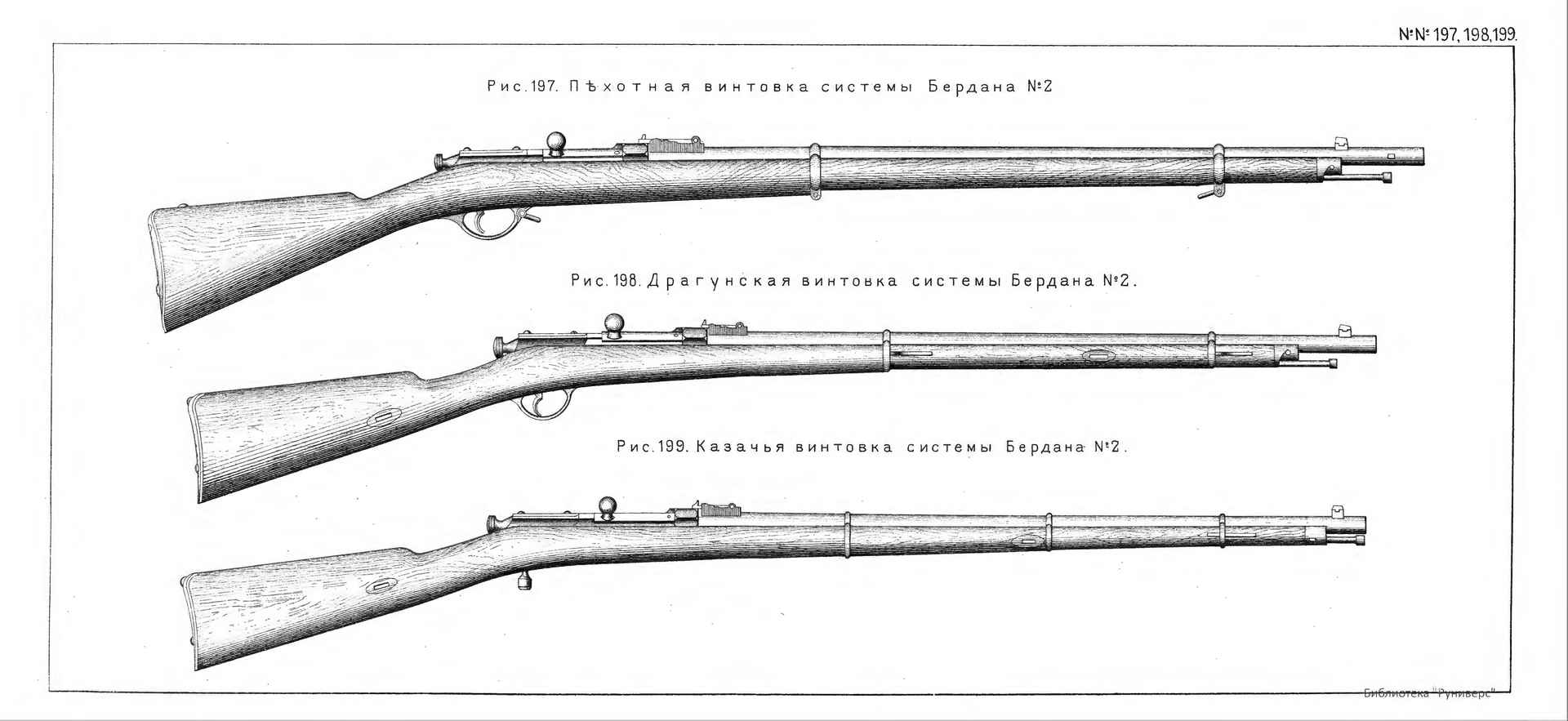
- From top to bottom: infantry, dragoon, and cossack variants
- Type: Single-shot rifle
- Place of origin: United States; Russia

Service history
- In service: 1870–1895, later as reserve issue
- Used by: See § Users
- Wars: Paraguayan War; Argentine Civil Wars; Franco-Prussian War; Russo-Turkish War of 1877–78; First Italo-Ethiopian War; Russo-Japanese War; Balkan Wars; World War I; Russian Revolution; Finnish Civil War; Second Italo-Ethiopian War; Winter War

Production history
- Designer: Hiram Berdan
- Designed: 1868 (Berdan I); 1870 (Berdan II)
- Produced: 1868–1891
- No. built: 3,000,000
- Variants: Berdan I: infantry rifle Berdan II: infantry rifle, dragoon rifle, cossack rifle, cavalry carbine

Specifications
- Mass: 4.6 kg (10 lb) with bayonet 4.2 kg (9.3 lb) without bayonet 3.58 kg (7.9 lb) (Dragoon); 3.38 kg (7.5 lb) (Cossack); 2.8 kg (6.2 lb) (Carbine)
- Length: 130 cm (51 in) (Infantry rifle)
- Barrel length: 83 cm (33 in) (Infantry rifle); 72 cm (28 in) (Dragoon); 71.8 cm (28.3 in) (Cossack); 47.5 cm (18.7 in) (Carbine)
- Cartridge: 10.75×58mmR; 7.62×54mmR
- Action: Berdan I trapdoor Berdan II bolt-action
- Rate of fire: 6–8 rounds per minute
- Muzzle velocity: 437 m/s
- Effective firing range: 400 arshins (284 m, 310.6 yd)
- Feed system: Single-shot
- Sights: rear sight in arshins 200–1200; front sight is inverted v; some infantry rifles have a long range "volley sight" on the right side of front barrel band, along with a second "V" on the right side of the rear sight slide installed after 1878

The Berdan rifle (Russian: винтовка Бердана, romanized: vintovka Berdana) is a single-shot rifle created by American engineer and inventor Hiram Berdan in 1868. It was the service rifle of the Imperial Russian Army from 1870 when it replaced the Krnka to 1891, when it was replaced by the Mosin–Nagant rifle. The gun was widely used in Russia as a hunting weapon, and sporting variants, including shotguns, were produced until the mid-1930s. The Russian Berdan I (M1868) and Berdan II (M1870) rifles of .42 caliber are distinct from the Spanish Berdan 15 mm (0.591 in) conversion rifles adopted by Spain as the M1857/67 Berdan (and related engineer, artillery & short rifles).

== History ==
In February 1866, General Hiram Berdan patented a trapdoor mechanism for firearms and a Berdan-type gun was submitted to the United States Army trials of 1865–6, but it was rejected in favor of the Springfield Model 1866.

Berdan also developed a hammerless action, using a straight-line striker instead of an external hammer, which was patented in the United States in March 1869. Berdan worked closely with Russian officers Colonel A. P. Gorlov and Lieutenant K. I. Gunius (both sent to the US in 1866 to study the breechloader designs being trialed there) on a new design that eventually became the Berdan No. 1 rifle and its 10.6 mm (42 caliber) cartridge.

In 1869, the Russian Empire ordered a total of 30,000 rifles and 7.5 million 10.6 mm cartridges from Colt, while a slightly modified Berdan trapdoor-action was adopted by Spain in 1867 to convert their old caplock rifles to use metallic cartridges.

According to E. C. Ezell, Russian plans of locally manufacturing Berdan No. 1 rifles came into a halt when Berdan himself arrived in Saint Petersburg in the spring of 1869 to promote his bolt action No. 2 rifle, which was tested by the Artillery Commission and recommended by the Minister of War Dmitry Milyutin, who ordered the production of No. 1 rifles (out of an order of 60,000 rifles, only 16,575 rifles were produced by Russian arsenals) to be terminated in favor of the No. 2 rifle. After some objections from Gorlov, who believed that Berdan's new design was inferior to the No. 1 rifle, new tests with both rifles were conducted and ultimately Milyutin decided on the production of the Model 1870 Berdan (No. 2) rifle.

== Berdan I ==
Two different versions of the later single-shot Berdan rifle were adopted as service weapons by Imperial Russia. The first version, manufactured by Colt in the US, is known as model 1868, or Berdan I. It is a hammerless "trapdoor" breechblock design, and was manufactured in limited numbers (the contract stipulated 30,000) as a full-length infantry rifle. Colt also manufactured a few half-stock Berdan I cavalry carbine prototypes, but these were never adopted for Russian service. Colt even produced a few target rifles based on the Berdan I.

== Berdan II ==
The model 1870, or Berdan II, is a single-shot bolt-action with a distinctive short, pear-shaped bolt handle. The bolt handle serves as the only locking lug for the action, and when closed, points upwards at a 30-degree angle, rather than horizontally. The Berdan II was produced in four variants: an infantry rifle, the lighter and slightly shorter Dragoon rifle, a Cossack rifle with a button trigger and no trigger guard, and a cavalry carbine. Infantry and dragoon rifles were issued with quadrangular socket bayonets. Initial production of the Berdan II was at Birmingham Small Arms in England. The rifles were later manufactured in large numbers by Russian factories at Tula, Izhevsk, and Sestroretsk. Estimated total production of all models is over 3 million. The rifle was known for its accuracy, simplicity and reliability.

== Cartridge ==
The 10.7×58mmR cartridge used in the Berdan was also invented by Hiram Berdan, with the assistance of Russian colonel Alexander Gorlov. It was the subject of many patents in both the United States and United Kingdom. The bottleneck cartridge case used the Berdan primer, its first use in a small arms cartridge. Cartridges were issued in blue paper packets of six rounds each. In addition to the regular cartridge for rifles, a special cartridge was manufactured for use in the cavalry carbine. It consisted of the same cartridge case and bullet, but with a lighter powder charge of only 4.5 grams, and was issued in six round pink paper packets. At the time of its use, the 10.75×58mmR (4.2 line) cartridge was known for its power and accuracy.

== Later usage ==
No magazine-fed versions of the Berdan ever progressed beyond the prototype phase. Russian troops, however, did have various cartridge holders, such as the Krnka quick-loader, attached to their rifles to aid in reloading. By the late 1880s Russia began the process of replacing the Berdan with a high velocity and magazine fed rifle, and this resulted in the adoption of the Mosin–Nagant. In 1892, a batch of 3,004 Berdan II rifles were converted to 7.62×54mmR for Russian service by arms makers in Belgium. These rifles have new barrels and sights, and new bolts with a front locking lug and longer bolt handle. Had the conversion been deemed fit for service, an additional 40,000 were to be converted. However this did not go through.

Sporting rifles and shotguns were re-manufactured in Russia from surplus rifles after the Mosin–Nagant was adopted into service, often referred to as "Frovlovka"

"Finally I thought of something: I offered to him to exchange his old gun for a new one. But he refused, saying that the berdanka was dear to him because of the memory of his father, that he was used to it and that it shoots very well. He reached over to the tree, took up his gun and began to stroke on the stock with his hand."

— Dersu Uzala, V. K. Arsenyev.

== Markings ==
Markings on the Berdan rifle usually consist of the Imperial Russian double-headed eagle cypher on the top receiver flat. The manufacturer's name in Cyrillic, date of manufacture, and rifle serial number, are on the top of the barrel. Some rifles also show a date of manufacture on the receiver. The serial number was also applied to the bolt. Additional proof marks and property markings are found on the receiver and barrel. There is a factory cartouche on the right side of the buttstock.

== Comparison with contemporary rifles ==
Comparison of 1880s rifles
Calibre	System	Country	Velocity					Height of trajectory				Ammunition	
Calibre	System	Country	Muzzle	500 yd (460 m)	1,000 yd (910 m)	1,500 yd (1,400 m)	2,000 yd (1,800 m)	500 yd (460 m)	1,000 yd (910 m)	1,500 yd (1,400 m)	2,000 yd (1,800 m)	Propellant	Bullet
.433 in (11.0 mm)	Werndl–Holub rifle	Austria-Hungary	1,439 ft/s (439 m/s)	854 ft/s (260 m/s)	620 ft/s (190 m/s)	449 ft/s (137 m/s)	328 ft/s (100 m/s)	8.252 ft (2.515 m)	49.41 ft (15.06 m)	162.6 ft (49.6 m)	426.0 ft (129.8 m)	77 gr (5.0 g)	370 gr (24 g)
.45 in (11.43 mm)	Martini–Henry	United Kingdom	1,315 ft/s (401 m/s)	869 ft/s (265 m/s)	664 ft/s (202 m/s)	508 ft/s (155 m/s)	389 ft/s (119 m/s)	9.594 ft (2.924 m)	47.90 ft (14.60 m)	147.1 ft (44.8 m)	357.85 ft (109.07 m)	85 gr (5.5 g)	480 gr (31 g)
.433 in (11.0 mm)	Fusil Gras mle 1874	France	1,489 ft/s (454 m/s)	878 ft/s (268 m/s)	643 ft/s (196 m/s)	471 ft/s (144 m/s)	348 ft/s (106 m/s)	7.769 ft (2.368 m)	46.6 ft (14.2 m)	151.8 ft (46.3 m)	389.9 ft (118.8 m)	80 gr (5.2 g)	386 gr (25.0 g)
.433 in (11.0 mm)	Mauser Model 1871	Germany	1,430 ft/s (440 m/s)	859 ft/s (262 m/s)	629 ft/s (192 m/s)	459 ft/s (140 m/s)	388 ft/s (118 m/s)	8.249 ft (2.514 m)	48.68 ft (14.84 m)	159.2 ft (48.5 m)	411.1 ft (125.3 m)	75 gr (4.9 g)	380 gr (25 g)
.408 in (10.4 mm)	M1870 Italian Vetterli	Italy	1,430 ft/s (440 m/s)	835 ft/s (255 m/s)	595 ft/s (181 m/s)	422 ft/s (129 m/s)	304 ft/s (93 m/s)	8.527 ft (2.599 m)	52.17 ft (15.90 m)	176.3 ft (53.7 m)	469.9 ft (143.2 m)	62 gr (4.0 g)	310 gr (20 g)
.397 in (10.08 mm)	Jarmann M1884	Norway and Sweden	1,536 ft/s (468 m/s)	908 ft/s (277 m/s)	675 ft/s (206 m/s)	504 ft/s (154 m/s)	377 ft/s (115 m/s)	7.235 ft (2.205 m)	42.97 ft (13.10 m)	137.6 ft (41.9 m)	348.5 ft (106.2 m)	77 gr (5.0 g)	337 gr (21.8 g)
.42 in (10.67 mm)	Berdan rifle	Russia	1,444 ft/s (440 m/s)	873 ft/s (266 m/s)	645 ft/s (197 m/s)	476 ft/s (145 m/s)	353 ft/s (108 m/s)	7.995 ft (2.437 m)	47.01 ft (14.33 m)	151.7 ft (46.2 m)	388.7 ft (118.5 m)	77 gr (5.0 g)	370 gr (24 g)
.45 in (11.43 mm)	Springfield model 1884	United States	1,301 ft/s (397 m/s)	875 ft/s (267 m/s)	676 ft/s (206 m/s)	523 ft/s (159 m/s)	404 ft/s (123 m/s)	8.574 ft (2.613 m)	46.88 ft (14.29 m)	142.3 ft (43.4 m)	343.0 ft (104.5 m)	70 gr (4.5 g)	500 gr (32 g)
.40 in (10.16 mm)	Enfield-Martini	United Kingdom	1,570 ft/s (480 m/s)	947 ft/s (289 m/s)	719 ft/s (219 m/s)	553 ft/s (169 m/s)	424 ft/s (129 m/s)	6.704 ft (2.043 m)	39.00 ft (11.89 m)	122.0 ft (37.2 m)	298.47 ft (90.97 m)	85 gr (5.5 g)	384 gr (24.9 g)

== Users ==
- Argentina: Acquired a small batch of Berdan №1 rifles in 1877 and were in service until 1881.
- Austro-Hungarian Empire: Captured rifles were used in WW1. The receivers were marked "AZF" by Artilleriezeugsfabrik & had sling slots added to the stock. Some were converted to flare guns as well.
- Emirate of Bukhara: 1000 supplied to Muzaffar bin Nasrullah by Russia in 1883; those weapons were only issued after 1885. 2000 purchased for 'Abd al-Ahad Khan's bodyguard in 1889
- Kingdom of Bulgaria: At least 30,000 Berdan №2 rifles and 10 million rounds were bought from Russia for the Bulgarian army. They were replaced in front line service with Mannlicher rifles.
- Ethiopian Empire: The Russian Empire sent 30,000 Berdan rifles to Ethiopia before the First Italo-Ethiopian War. Some were hand-modified into carbines
- Finland: Limited usage during the Winter War
- France: During the Franco-Prussian War, France purchased 5,760 Berdan №1 rifles & 63,000 Spanish M1857/67 models.
- Democratic Republic of Georgia
- German Empire: Limited use of captured rifles during WWI
- Qajar Iran: A Cossack unit was formed and provided Berdans from the Czar.
- Khanate of Kokand: Smoothbore copies manufactured in the 1870s.
- Korean Empire: At least 3,000 rifles were received from Russia
- Principality of Montenegro: Received 30,000 Berdan №2 and 15 million cartridges in 1895.
- Russian Empire: Both the Berdan №1 and Berdan №2 were used by guard units in the Russian Army during the Russo-Turkish War of 1877–78. Russian forces, although ultimately victorious, were badly mauled by the very long range fire from Turk Peabody–Martini rifles during the Siege of Plevna. After the war a long-range auxiliary sight was adopted and retrofitted to the Berdan II infantry rifle. The Berdanka, as it was called, continued on in Russian service even after the adoption of the Mosin–Nagant, primarily with reserve and rear echelon units when the Mosin-Nagant became plentiful. Many Russian troops had Berdan rifles in the Russo-Japanese War of 1905. During World War I, some Russian second line, training and service units were armed with the Berdan II. It is common to see Berdan rifles in photos of street fighting taken during the Russian Revolution of 1917.
- Kingdom of Serbia in 1890 received 76,000 rifles as military aid. They saw service in the Balkan Wars and the First World War in the hands of Serbian soldiers of the 3rd class (men over 50 years old).
- Spain: Berdan-trapdoor conversions
- Yettishar: 1000 supplied by Russia in 1869. Locally made copies were manufactured.

== See also ==
- Berdan Sharps rifle
- List of modern Russian small arms and light weapons
- Table of handgun and rifle cartridges
