= Albini-Braendlin rifle =

Albini Rifle
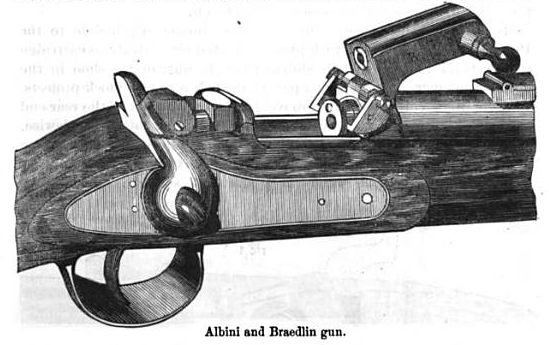
- Type: Service rifle
- Place of origin: Belgium

Service history
- In service: 1867–1918 (Belgium)
- Used by: Belgium; Belgian Congo; Kingdom of Italy; Kingdom of Portugal (Macau); Russian Empire; Empire of Japan; Kingdom of Dahomey

Production history
- Designer: Augusto Albini, Francis Braendlin
- Designed: 1867
- Manufacturer: Manufacture d’Armes de L’État

Specifications
- Caliber: 11×42mmR
- Feed system: Single Shot
- Sights: Iron

The Albini rifle (or Albini-Braendlin rifle) was a single-shot 11mm rifle adopted by Belgium in 1867. The action on the Albini rifle was designed by Italian naval officer Augusto Albini and was perfected by an English gunsmith, Francis Braendlin. Initially, there were delays and problems with its delivery as the rifle seemed to have extractor issues and the Terssen rifle was adopted as a temporary measure. But once the problem was fixed and the availability of Albinis increased, Terssens were eventually withdrawn from service. The Albini rifles were eventually replaced by M1870 Belgian Comblain rifles beginning in the 1870s.

== Distinguishing characteristics ==
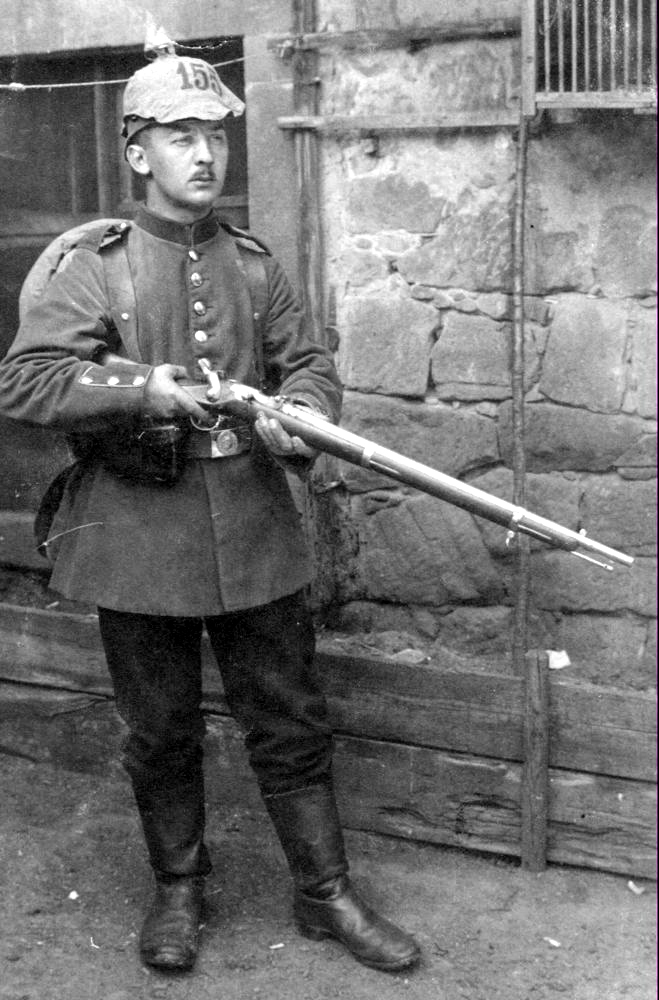
Prussian Soldier in WW1 armed with a captured Belgian Albini-Braendlin Rifle

The rifle has a front-hinged, forward lifting action with a mechanism that works together with the hammer-striker assembly to simultaneously lock and fire the rifle. The breech block itself houses longitudinal spring-loaded firing pin which is struck by a cylindrical striker, the back end of which is attached to the hammer via a screw through the hammer nose, and which passes longitudinally through the rear of the receiver behind the firing pin. When fired, the striker moves into the back of the breech block striking the firing pin and locking the block in place at ignition. Both striker and firing pin move in the same line as the rifle bore. Pulling the hammer back withdraws the striker from the breech block allowing it to be lifted on its pivot pin by means of a small fixed knob on the right side of the block.
