= Hiram Berdan =

American engineer and military officer (1824–1893)

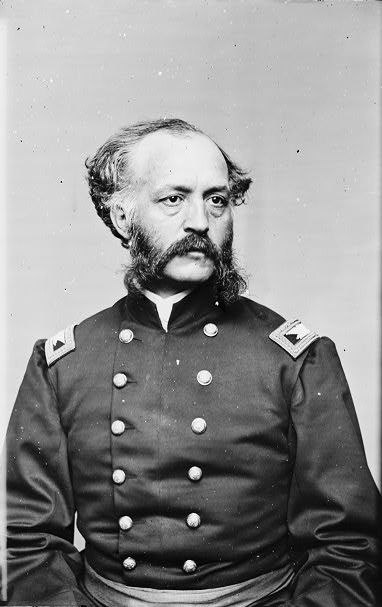
- Born: September 6, 1824; Phelps, New York, US
- Died: March 31, 1893 (aged 68); Washington, D.C., US
- Burial place: Arlington National Cemetery
- Military career
- Allegiance: United States
- Branch: Union Army
- Service years: 1861–1864
- Rank: Colonel; Bvt. Brigadier General
- Commands: 1st United States Volunteer Sharpshooter Regiment; 2nd United States Volunteer Sharpshooter Regiment
- Conflicts: American Civil War
- Other work: Mechanical engineer, inventor

Hiram Berdan (September 6, 1824 – March 31, 1893) was an American engineer, inventor, military officer, marksman, and guiding force behind and commanding colonel of the United States Volunteer Sharpshooter Regiments during the American Civil War. He was the inventor of the Berdan rifle, the Berdan centerfire primer and other weapons and accessories.

== Early life ==
Berdan was born in Phelps, a small town in Ontario County, New York. A mechanical engineer in New York City, he had been the top rifle shot in the country for fifteen years prior to the Civil War. He invented a repeating rifle and a patented musket ball before the war. He had also developed the first commercial gold amalgamation machine to separate gold from ore. He invented a reaper and a mechanical bakery. His inventions had brought him wealth and international fame.

== Civil War ==
In the summer and fall of 1861, he was involved in the recruiting of eighteen companies, from eight states, which were formed into two sharpshooter regiments with the backing of General Winfield Scott and President Abraham Lincoln. Berdan was named as Colonel of the resultant 1st and 2nd U.S. Sharpshooters on November 30, 1861. His men, who had to pass rigorous marksmanship tests, were dressed in distinctive green uniforms and equipped with Sharps breech-loading rifles. Even when assigned to a brigade, the regiments were usually detached for special assignments on the field of battle. They were frequently used for skirmish duty. Berdan fought at the Seven Days Battles and Second Battle of Bull Run. In September 1862, his sharpshooters were at the Battle of Shepherdstown. Berdan commanded the 2nd Brigade, 3rd Division, 3rd Corps, Army of the Potomac in February and March 1863, then he commanded the 3rd Brigade at the Battle of Chancellorsville. Although Berdan was an innovative officer, as a leader he proved unpopular with the officers and soldiers under his command. In 1862, several of the sharpshooters' officers formally complained to General Daniel Butterfield, Berdan's immediate commander, that Berdan was both dishonest and a coward. In July 1862, General Fitz John Porter condemned Berdan as incompetent.

=== Gettysburg ===
At the Battle of Gettysburg, his two regiments of sharpshooters played an important role in delaying Confederate attacks on Devil's Den and the Peach Orchard. In a sharp encounter in Pitzer's Woods on Seminary Ridge, the 1st U.S. Sharpshooters stalled the advancing Alabama brigade of Cadmus Wilcox. Berdan assumed command of J. H. Hobart Ward's brigade when the latter became acting division commander (David B. Birney having become acting corps commander following the wounding of Daniel Sickles) and led the division throughout the rest of the campaign, as well as during the subsequent Bristoe and Mine Run campaigns.

== Post-war career ==
Berdan resigned his commission on January 2, 1864, and returned to his career as an engineer and inventor. On December 8, 1868, President Andrew Johnson nominated Berdan for appointment to the brevet grade of brigadier general of volunteers, to rank from March 13, 1865, for the Battle of Chancellorsville, at which he led a brigade, and the U.S. Senate confirmed the appointment on February 16, 1869. Although President Johnson also nominated Berdan for appointment to the brevet grade of major general of volunteers to rank from the same date for his services at the Battle of Gettysburg, at which he also led a brigade, the U.S. Senate did not confirm that appointment. Despite the lack of necessary Senate confirmation of the appointment to make it official, many sources refer to Berdan as a brevet major general and even his grave stone in Arlington National Cemetery indicates he was a brevet major general.

He was considered by many to be a crack marksman and innovator, but unfit for field command. Berdan subsequently invented numerous engines of war, including a steam-powered torpedo boat, a torpedo capable of evading nets, a long-distance rangefinder and a distance fuse for shrapnel shells.

Berdan briefly worked for the Remington Arms but left the company to establish the Berdan Firearms Manufacturing Company. He also filled patents for a trapdoor mechanism for firearms and a straight-line striker hammerless action, both used on the Berdan No. 1 rifles sold to the Russian Empire in 1869; some of Berdan's mechanisms were also incorporated into the Springfield Model 1866 rifle and subsequently he filed a lawsuit at the Court of Claims. In 1895, the US government paid a sum of approximately $95,000 ($3.68 million in 2025) to Berdan's estate for patent infringement.

== Death ==
Berdan suffered a hemorrhagic stroke during a game of chess and died on March 31, 1893 at the Metropolitan Club of the City of Washington, and was buried in Arlington National Cemetery.

== Fictional portrayals ==
The part of Hiram Berdan was played by Kurtwood Smith in the 1986 ABC miniseries.

A film created by Silver Domino Productions was based on Berdan and his men.

== See also ==
- List of American Civil War brevet generals (Union)
