= Springfield Model 1866 =

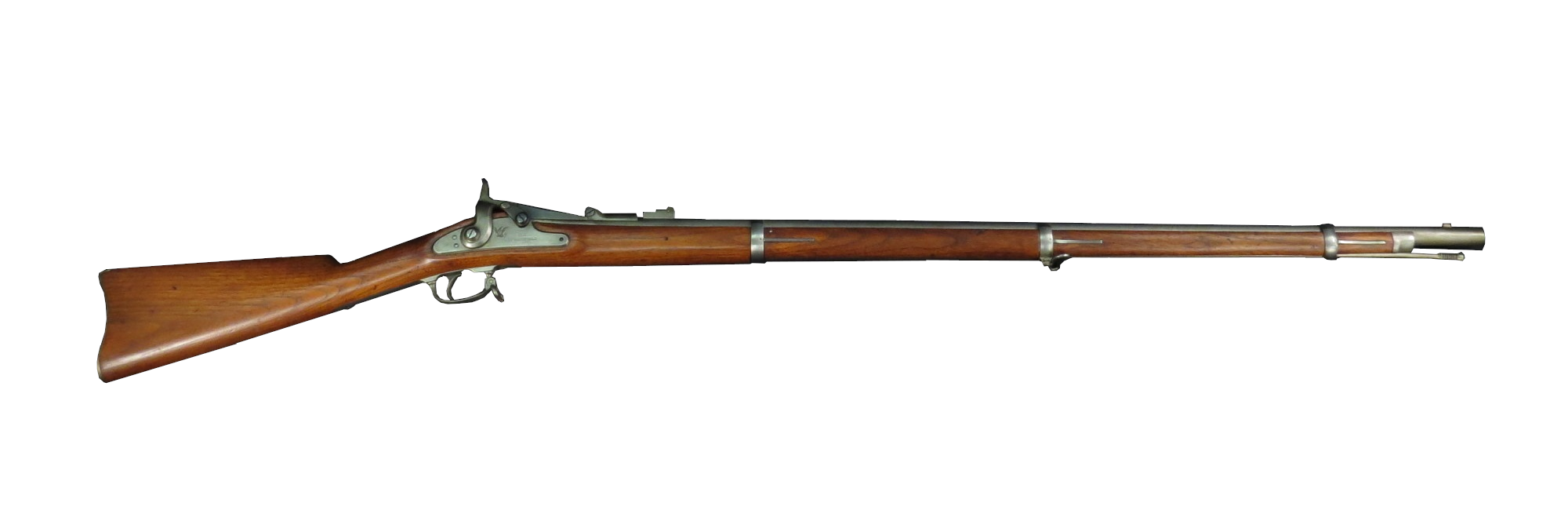
- Type: Breech-loading rifle
- Place of origin: United States

Service history
- In service: 1866–1873
- Used by: United States; Japan; France
- Wars: American Indian Wars; Boshin War; Franco-Prussian War

Production history
- Designer: Erskine S. Allin
- Designed: 1866
- Manufacturer: Springfield Armory
- Produced: 1866–1868
- No. built: Approx. 52,000
- Variants: Model 1866 short rifle, Model 1866 cadet rifle

Specifications
- Length: 56 in (1,400 mm)
- Barrel length: 40.0 in (1,020 mm)
- Cartridge: .50-70-450
- Action: Trapdoor
- Rate of fire: User dependent; usually 8 to 10 rounds per minute
- Feed system: Breech-loading
- Sights: Open sights

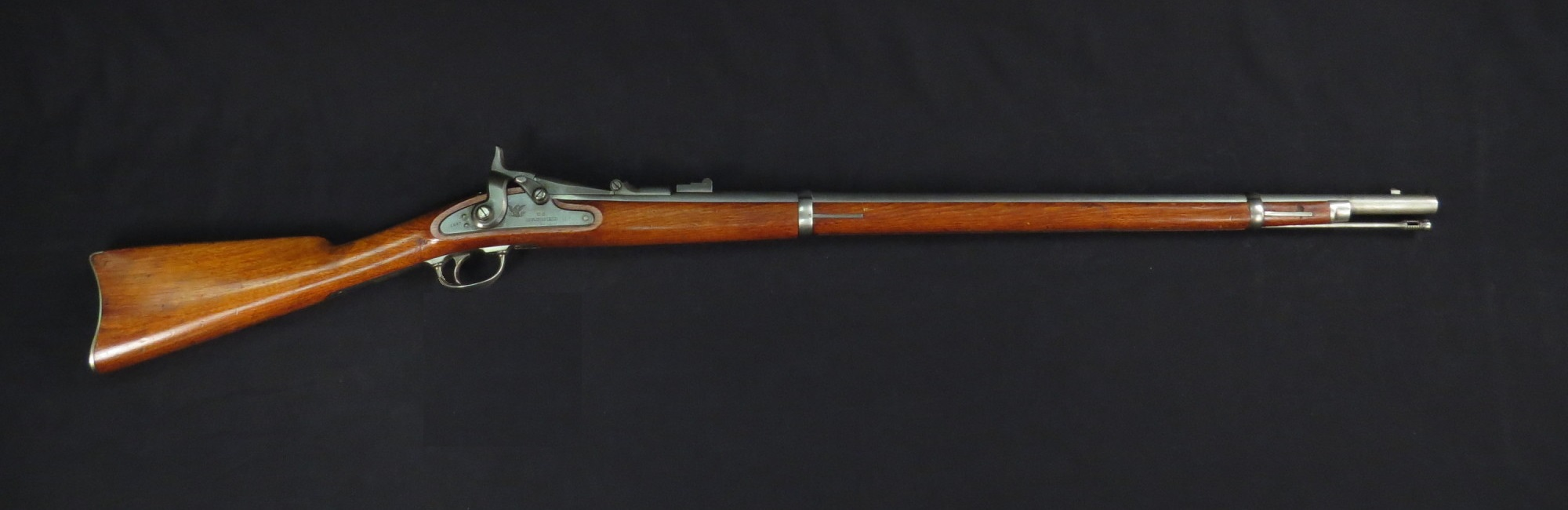
Springfield Model 1866 cadet rifle

The Springfield Model 1866 was the second iteration of the Erskine S. Allin designed trapdoor breech-loading mechanism. Originally developed as a means of converting rifled muskets to breechloaders, the Allin modification ultimately became the basis for the definitive Springfield Model 1873, the first breech-loading rifle adopted by the United States War Department for manufacture and widespread issue to U.S. troops.

== Overview ==
The Model 1866 corrected problems encountered with the prototypical Springfield Model 1865, in particular a simplified and improved extractor and a superior .50 caliber centerfire cartridge (the Model 1865 used a .58 caliber rimfire cartridge with mediocre ballistics), among many other less significant changes. It employed a robust version of the trapdoor breechblock design originated by Erskine S. Allin, Master Armorer of the Springfield Armory.

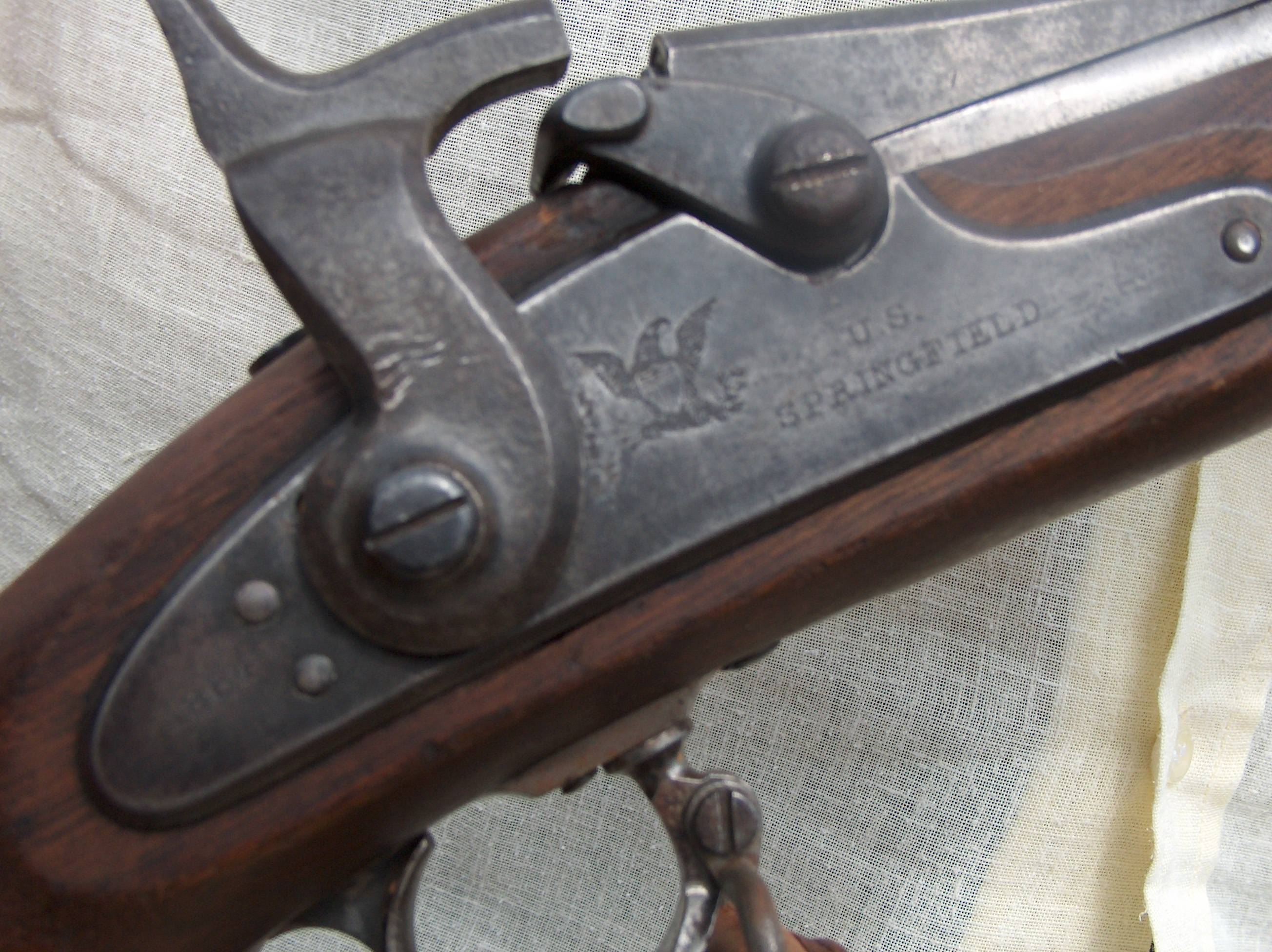
Springfield Model 1866 breech

== Historically usage ==
Approximately 52,000 .58 caliber Springfield Model 1863 rifled muskets were converted by Springfield Armory for use by U.S. troops, the barrels being relined and rifled to .50 caliber and the trapdoor breech system affixed. About half of the M1866 rifles produced were shipped to Asia and Europe for use in the Japanese revolution against the Edo Shōgunate and the Franco-Prussian War. Subsequently, the rifle was decommissioned or scrap, leaving approximately 26,000 units remaining within the United States.

The rifle was chambered for the powerful centerfire .50-70-450 cartridge (.50 caliber 450-grain (29 g) bullet; 70 grains (4.5 g) of powder). Though a significant improvement over the extractor of the Model 1865 rifle, the Model 1866 extractor was still excessively complicated and the extractor spring somewhat prone to breakage. However, it is a misconception that a broken extractor disabled the weapon. In the official 1867 government user booklet “Description and Rules for the Management of the Springfield Breech-Loading Rifle Musket, Model 1866”, the following is stated regarding a broken extractor and/or ejector: “It should be understood that the ejector and friction springs are convenient rather than necessary, and that the piece is not necessarily disabled if one or both of them should break, for the shell can be easily removed by the fingers after being loosened by the extractor hook.” Furthermore, the cleaning rod of the rifle can be used quite effectively to remove a stuck case in an emergency. Thus it is clear that this weapon is not as easily disabled as is sometimes believed.

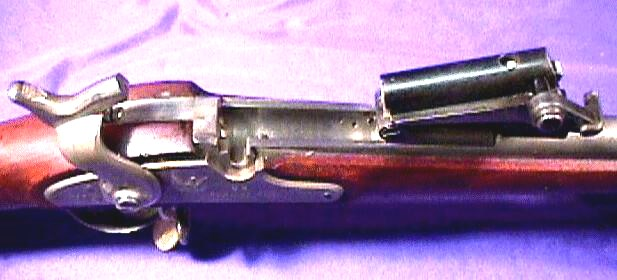
Closeup of the trapdoor mechanism

Erskine planned conversion far back in 1864. After the Civil War, known as the War Between the States. Model 1866 was issued to U.S. troops in 1867, and was a major factor in the Wagon Box Fight and the Hayfield Fight, along the Bozeman Trail in 1867. The rapid rate of fire which could be achieved disrupted the tactics of attacking Sioux and Cheyenne forces, who had faced muzzle-loading rifles during the Fetterman massacre only a few months before. The new rifles contributed decisively to the survival and success of severely outnumbered U.S. troops in these engagements.

== See also ==
- Springfield rifle

Preceded by Springfield Model 1865	United States military rifle 1866–1868	Succeeded by Springfield Model 1868
