= Springfield Model 1865 =

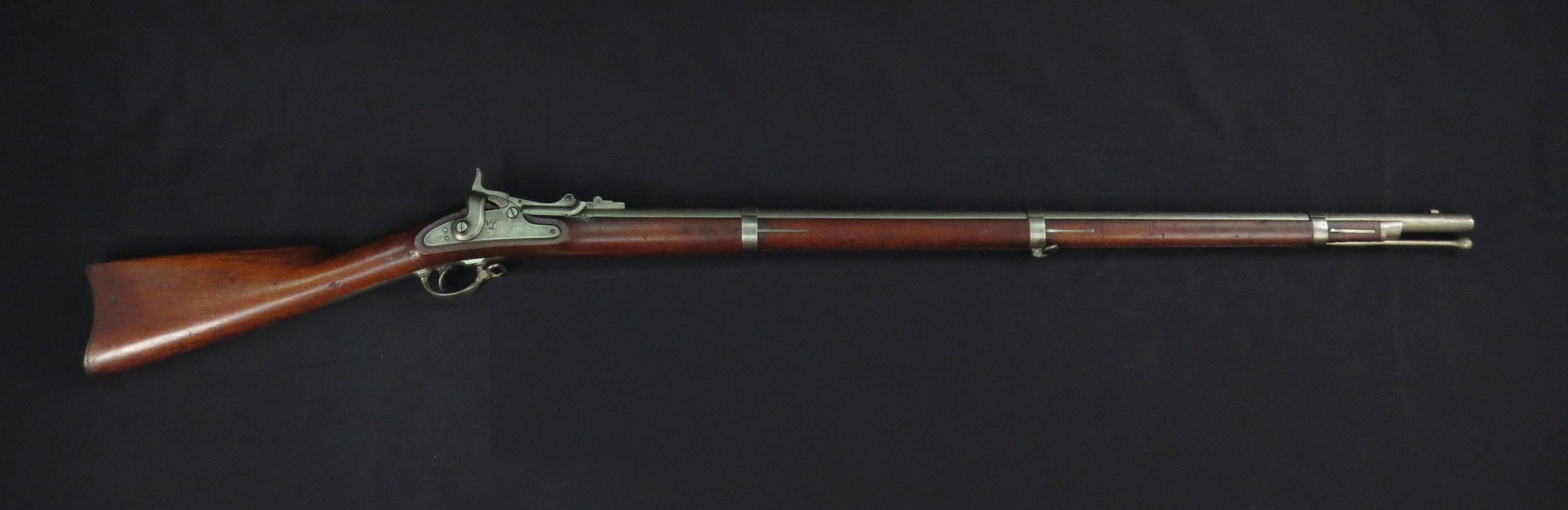
- Type: Breech-loading rifle
- Place of origin: United States

Service history
- Used by: United States, Argentina
- Wars: Paraguayan War

Production history
- Designer: Erskine S. Allin
- Designed: 1865
- Manufacturer: Springfield Armory
- No. built: 5,000
- Variants: short rifle (prototype)

Specifications
- Length: 56 in (1,400 mm)
- Barrel length: 40.0 in (1,020 mm)
- Diameter: .772 -.778 Inches
- Cartridge: Rimfire metallic cartridge 500-grain lead bullet
- Caliber: .58-60-500
- Action: Trapdoor
- Rate of fire: User dependent; usually 8 to 10 rounds per minute
- Feed system: Breech-loading
- Sights: Open sights

The Springfield Model 1865 was an early breech-loading rifle manufactured by U.S. Springfield Armory. It was a modification of the Springfield Model 1861 with trapdoor action. It was replaced by the Springfield Model 1866, which featured a more streamlined and robust breech mechanism.

== Description ==
During the U.S. Civil War, the advantage of breech-loading rifles became obvious. The rifled muskets used during the war had a rate of fire of 2 or 3 rounds per minute. Breech-loading rifles increased the rate of fire to 8 to 10 rounds per minute with the additional advantage that they can be easily loaded from a prone, rather than standing, position, reducing the rifleman's visible cross section and thus vulnerability to counter-fire. As the Civil War drew to a close, the U.S. Ordnance Department requested prototypes of breech-loading weapons from arms manufacturers all over the world.

Two were sent as diplomatic gifts to the Danish Government in April 1866 (one in the Allin pattern, one in the newer M1866 pattern). A short rifle variation was commissioned but never adopted and is considered rare.

In October 1867, a Cuban general proposed providing 1,000 units to Vice President Marcos Paz; these arrived in Rio de Janeiro in March 1868 for distribution to Argentine battalions engaged in the Paraguayan conflict.

After considerable testing, the prototype developed by Erskine S. Allin of the government-operated Springfield Armory was chosen for its simplicity and the fact that it could be produced by the modification of existing Model 1863 rifled muskets. These modifications cost about $5 per rifle, which was a significant savings at a time when new rifles cost about $15 each.

Patent No. 49,959 was issued to Allin on September 19, 1865, describing the design.

== Specifications ==
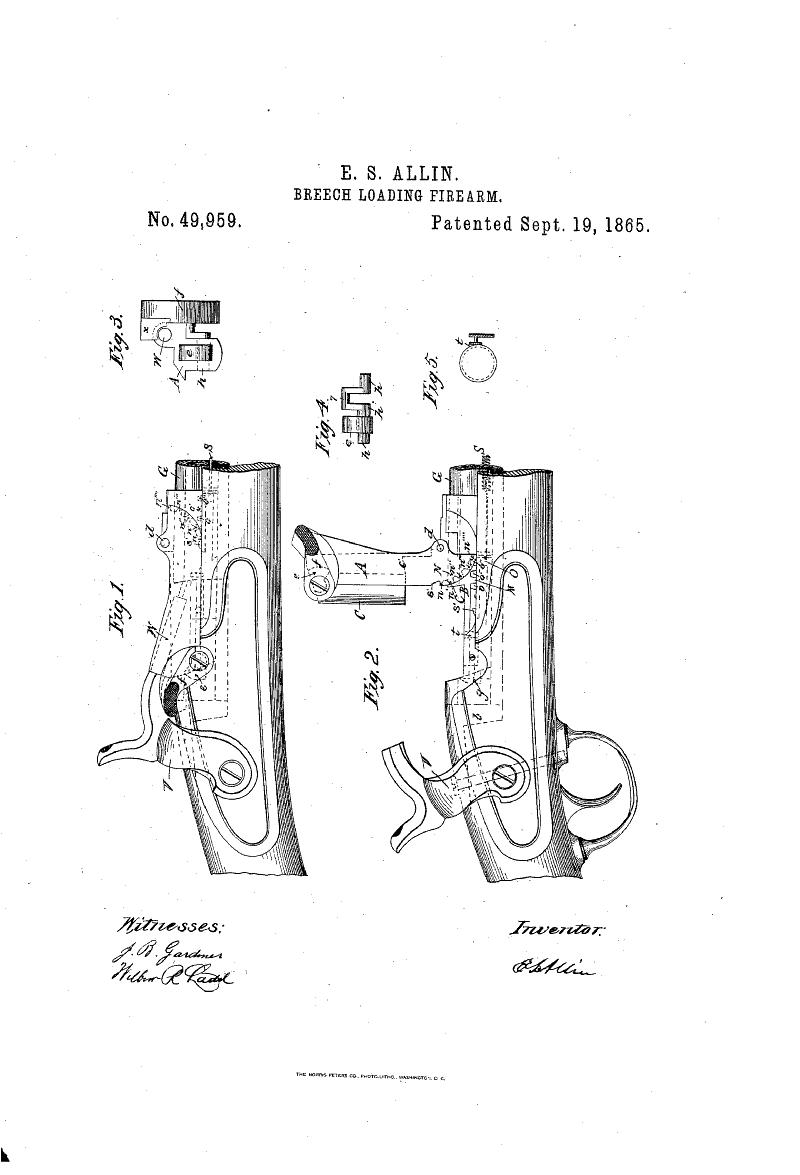
Drawing from Erskine S. Allin's patent for the Model 1865 rifle's breech-loading system.

The conversion from rifled musket to breech-loader was done by milling open the barrel's breech section and inserting a hinged breechblock fastened to the top of the barrel. A thumb-operated cam latch at the rear of the breechblock held it shut when in closed position. The rack-type system extractor was withdrawn automatically as the breechblock was opened and snapped back at the end of its stroke. The firing pin was housed within the breechblock. The hammer nose was flattened to accommodate the firing pin. The Model 1865 was designate nicknamed the "Needle gun".

The breech mechanism employed a hinged breechblock that rotated up and forward, resembling the movement of a trapdoor, to open the breech of the rifle and permit insertion of a cartridge. The hinged breechblock caused these rifles to be named "Trapdoor Springfields".

The converted model and it's short rifle configuration features a full butt plate and is assembled utilizing an M1863 Type I stock with corresponding M1863 hardware.

Approximately 5,000 Civil War Model 1861 rifled muskets were converted at the Springfield Armory in 1866. It soon became apparent that many of the small working parts in the breech system were not going to have a long service life, and the action was too complicated for normal service use. Therefore, before the Model 1865 production order was completed, a less complex rifle was already being tested. This caused the Model 1865 to be called the "First Allin", and the following revised model, the Model 1866, to be called the "Second Allin".

The Model 1865 fired a rimfire .58-60-500 cartridge (.58 inch 500-grain (32 g) bullet, 60 grains (3.9 g) of powder), the caliber matching that of the Civil War Minié ball, which was originally used in these rifles.

The Model 1865 quickly became obsolete, and most of them were sold in the 1870s to several American arms dealers. At the time, there was a large demand in the U.S. for shorter style cadet rifle. To satisfy this need, these dealers cut the barrels and stocks to make short rifles with 33-inch (84 cm) and 36-inch (91 cm) barrel lengths. Likewise, the stock wrists were often thinned for cadet use.

== See also ==
- Springfield rifle
  | Preceded by Springfield Model 1863 | United States military rifle 1865–1866 | Succeeded by Springfield Model 1866 |
