= .50-70 Government =

Rifle cartridge

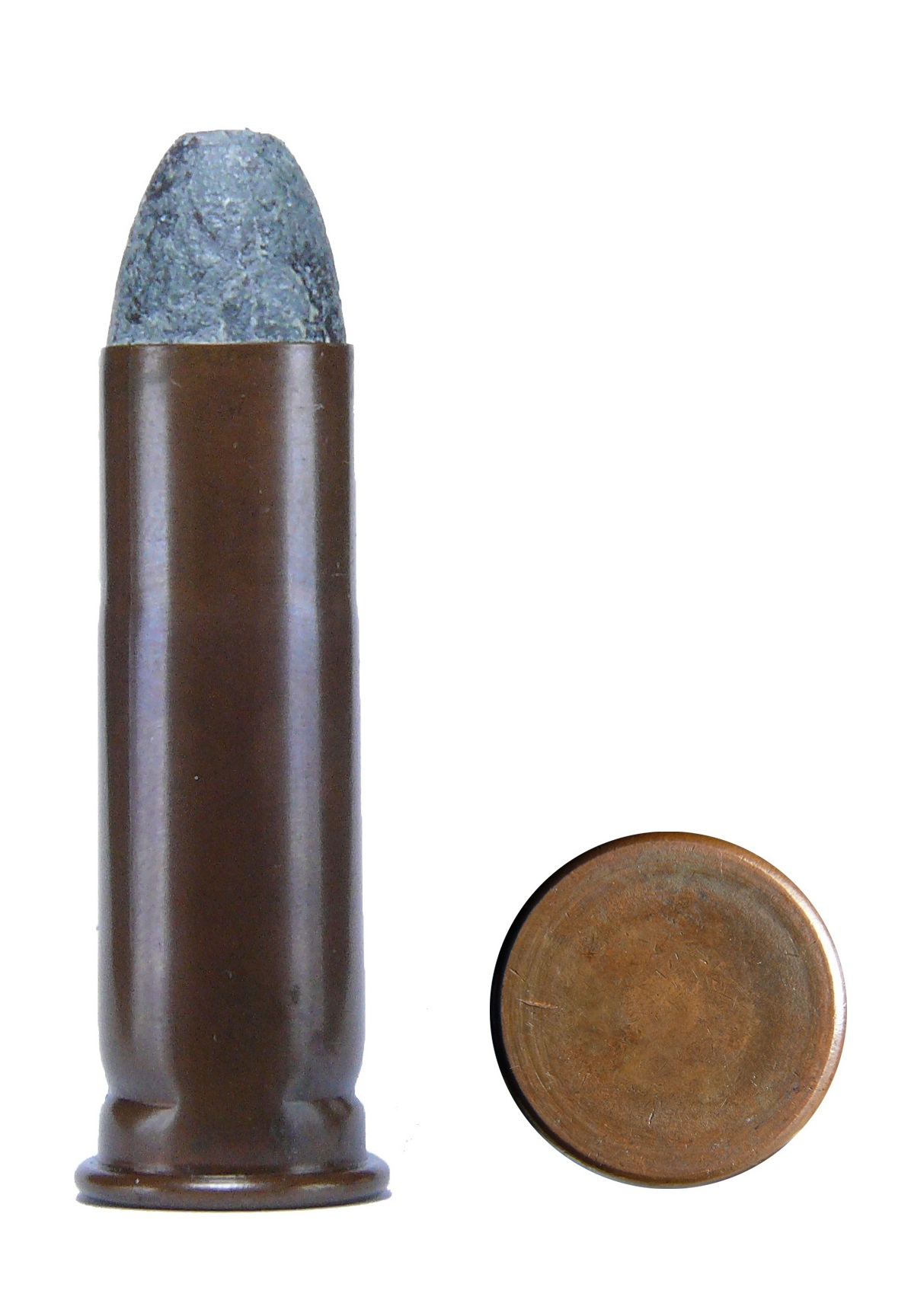
- .50-70 Government cartridge, note the hidden centrefire primer is held at the base internally by the cartridge crimps.
- Type: Rifle
- Place of origin: United States

Service history
- In service: 1866–1873
- Used by: United States

Production history
- Designed: 1866
- Produced: 1866–present

Specifications
- Case type: Rimmed, straight
- Bullet diameter: .515 in (13.1 mm)
- Neck diameter: .535 in (13.6 mm)
- Base diameter: .565 in (14.4 mm)
- Rim diameter: .660 in (16.8 mm)
- Rim thickness: .065 in (1.7 mm)
- Case length: 1.75 in (44 mm)
- Overall length: 2.25 in (57 mm)
- Primer type: Benét Internal
- Maximum pressure: 22,500 psi (155 MPa)

Ballistic performance
Bullet mass/type	Velocity	Energy
425 gr (28 g) lead SP	1,448 ft/s (441 m/s)	1,979 ft⋅lbf (2,683 J)
550 gr (36 g) lead FN	1,375 ft/s (419 m/s)	2,310 ft⋅lbf (3,130 J)
400 gr (26 g) SP	1,849 ft/s (564 m/s)	3,037 ft⋅lbf (4,118 J)
- Test barrel length: 28"; Source: Accurate Powder

The .50-70 Government (12.7×45mmR), also known as the .50-70 Musket, .50-70 Springfield, and .50-1 3/4" Sharps) is a black powder cartridge adopted in 1866 for the Springfield Model 1866 trapdoor rifle.

== History and description ==
Derived from the .50-60-400 Joslyn, the cartridge was developed after the unsatisfactory results of the .58 rimfire cartridge for the Springfield Model 1865 rifle. The .50-70 Government cartridge used the Benét internal center-fire primer design and became the official cartridge of the U.S. military in 1866 until being replaced by the .45-70 Government in 1873. The .50-70 cartridge has a pressure limit of 22,500 psi (155 MPa)

The official designation of this cartridge at the time of introduction was "US center-fire metallic cartridge", and the commercial designation .50-70-450, standing for:

- Caliber: .50 inches (13 mm)
- Powder charge: 70 grains (4.5 g) of black powder
- Bullet weight: 450 grains (29 g)

The U.S. Navy purchased Remington Rolling Block rifles chambered for the .50-70 cartridge. The U.S. Navy also contracted with Remington to produce several thousand rolling-block carbines chambered for a reduced load version which was officially produced for use only in carbines, using a shortened .50-70 with a 430-grain (28 g) bullet and 45 grains (2.9 g) of black powder.

The U.S. Army ordered both rolling-block rifles and carbines in .50-70 and made some rolling blocks at their Springfield Armory facility in this caliber. The U.S. Army also had a large supply of percussion-fired Sharps carbines at the close of the Civil War and had the Sharps Rifle Company convert about 31,000 of the rolling-block rifles and carbines in .50-70 for cavalry use. Meanwhile, the Army, which had exited the Civil War with an inventory of almost a million percussion-fired muzzleloaders, converted Springfield Model 1863 and Model 1864 muskets to metallic cartridge ammunition using the Allin conversion (trapdoor) method, as well as cadet rifles. The first of the .50-70 conversions was the Springfield Model 1866. In 1867, these rifles played a pivotal role in holding off an attacking force of 300-1,000 Lakota Sioux Indians during the Wagon Box Fight.

Around 1871, the Sioux captured a number of Springfield 1866 rifles that use these cartridges. Deemed single-use and not reloadable, soldiers would simply discard them which the Sioux collected and reloaded. Despite a strict ban of fixed ammunition sales to Native Americans, they were not restricted from acquiring lead (for bullets), black powder and percussion caps for their "obsolete" muskets. Here's how they reloaded these cartridges:

Taking one of their ordinary percussion caps for their muzzle-loaders, they inserted in the open end of it a small piece of gravel. They then forced the cap into a hole punched in the center of the [base of the] cartridge shell with a round nail or other pointed instrument. The piece of gravel served as an anvil under the firing pin to explode the fulminate...

This was dramatized on Death Valley Days, season 7, episode 15 titled "A Bullet for the Captain"

Newer improved versions were made and used by the Army until 1873. After 1873, with the advent of the .45-70 cartridge, the Army declared the .50-70 to be surplus, and while some rifles and carbines in .50-70 were issued to Indian Scouts, the bulk were simply sold off as surplus. In the U.S. Navy, however, the .50-70 cartridge and the guns associated with it remained in use until the late 1880s.

=== Use in the Papal state and Italy ===
During the second half of the 1860s, general Hermann Kanzler expanded and reformed the army of the Papal States, and part of that ca. 1867-1868 Remington Rolling Block rifles in .50-70 were procured, although not directly from Remington but from its European license holders Westley Richards and Fabrique d'armes Émile et Léon Nagant. After the Capture of Rome they saw service with Italian Bersaglieri troops and in the 1880s were sold off to civilians and to Ethiopia. They were used against their former owners not just in the First Italo-Ethiopian but even in the Second Italo-Ethiopian War.

This cartridge variant was later known in Europe as 12.7x45 mm Remington-Pontificio.

=== Civilian use ===
Buffalo Bill used a Springfield Model 1866 in .50-70, while buffalo hunting to feed the track workers of the Kansas Pacific Railway. General George Custer was known to have had and used a sporterized rolling block in .50-70 and was believed to have had it with him at the Battle of the Little Bighorn.

As Army General Philip Sheridan had embarked on a plan to eliminate the bison during the course of the American Indian Wars, the .50-70 rifles were also issued or purchased by buffalo hunters for use in eliminating the vast bison herds. Sharps began manufacturing sporterized rifles in .50-70 (including .50-90 Sharps, .50-110 Sharps, etc.), with improved sights for longer range shots for use by the buffalo hunters.

Modern-made functional replicas of caliber .50-70 historical rifles have been imported into the US by such firms as Davide Pedersoli and A. Uberti, Srl. (a Beretta subsidiary). The .50-70 cartridge still enjoys some use and popularity with sportsmen and cowboy action shooters. Reloaders have experimented with a variety of bullet weights from 425 grains (27.5 g) to 600 grains (39 g).

== See also ==
- 13 mm caliber
- List of rifle cartridges
- List of rimmed cartridges
