= Rolling block =

Single-shot firearm action

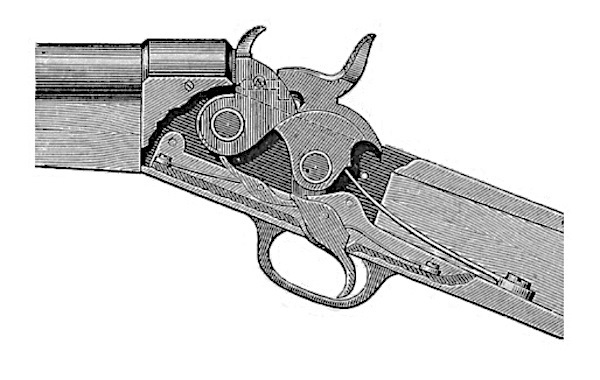
Rolling-block breech

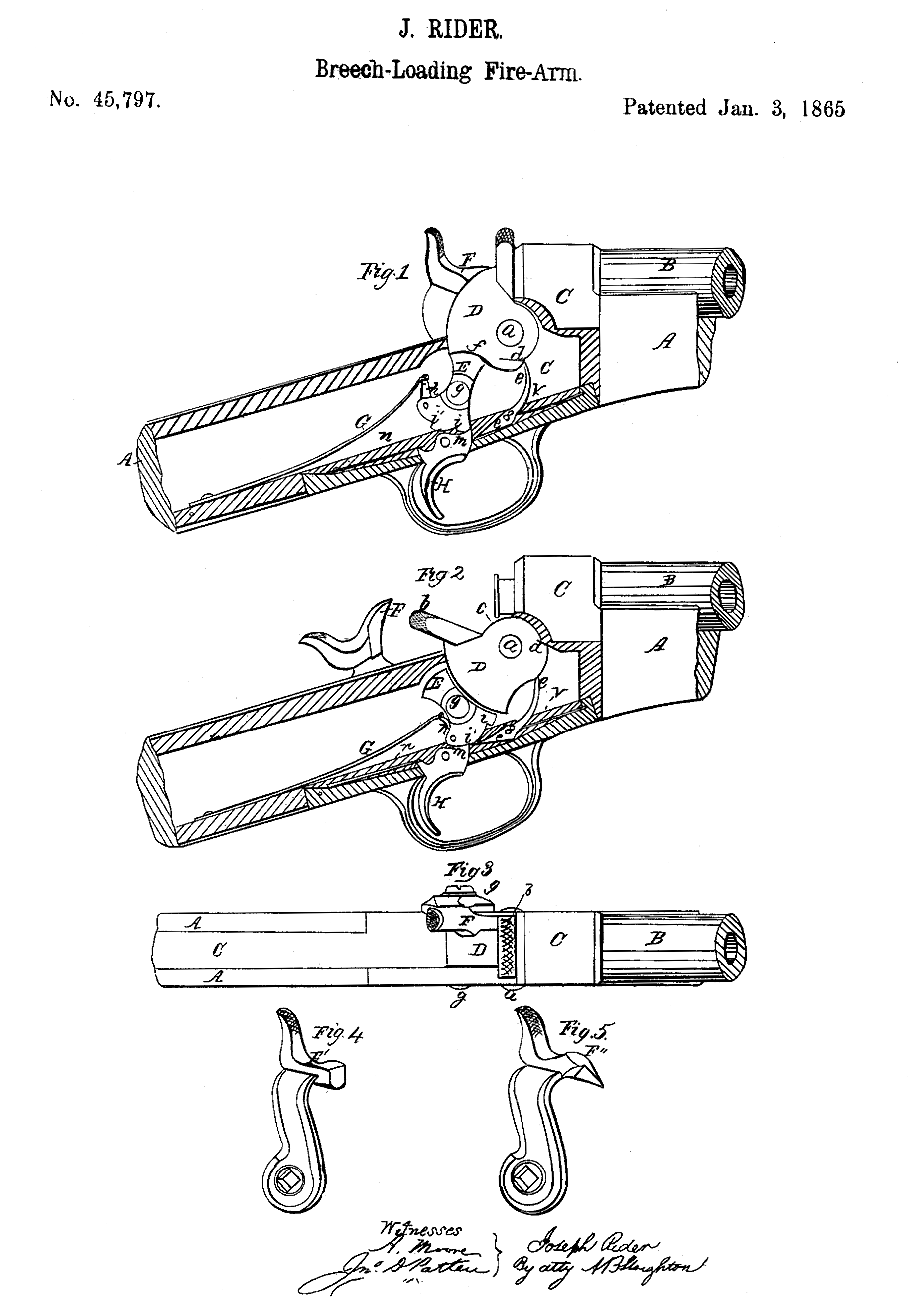
Joseph Rider's 1865 patent drawings

A rolling-block action is a single-shot firearm action where the sealing of the breech is done with a specially shaped breechblock able to rotate on a pin. The breechblock is shaped like a section of a circle. The breechblock is locked into place by the hammer, therefore preventing the cartridge from moving backward at the moment of firing. By cocking the hammer, the breechblock can be rotated freely to reload the breech of the weapon.

== History ==
The Remington Rolling Block rifle is one of the most successful and commonly used single-shot weapons ever produced, being adopted for military use by numerous countries worldwide. It is a strong, simple, and very reliable action, that is not prone to be jammed by debris or with rough handling. It was invented by Leonard Geiger during the United States Civil War and patented in 1863, who (along with his partner, Charles Alger) negotiated a royalty deal with Remington when they put it into production as the so-called "split breech" action late in the war. That design was re-engineered by Joseph Rider in 1865 and called the "Remington System". The first firearm based on it, the Model 1865 Remington Pistol, was offered for sale to the United States Army and Navy in 1866. While the Army turned the design down, the Navy committed to purchase 5,000 pistols.

The first rifle based on this design was introduced at the Paris Exposition in 1867 and the United States Navy placed an order for 12,000 rifles. Within a year it had become the standard military rifle of several nations, including Sweden, Norway, and Denmark.

Many earlier percussion rifles and muskets were converted to rolling-block designs in the interim before the development of more modern bolt-action designs.

The Remington M1867, Springfield Model 1870, and Springfield Model 1871 rifles also used the rolling-block action.

Remington built estimated 1.5 million firearms with rolling-block action, encompassing rifles, carbines, shotguns and pistols.

The Nagant 1877 pistol used a rolling block action.

== Barton Jenks rolling block action ==
A single-shot action developed by Barton Jenks from Bridesburg, Philadelphia right after the Civil War was locked not by the hammer itself, but by a separate hinging piece on the breechblock; it was tested by the US military in 1866 but not adopted.

== See also ==
- Bolt action
- Lever action
- Pump action
- Break action
- Falling-block action
- Semi-automatic rifle
