= Springfield Model 1863 =

Musket

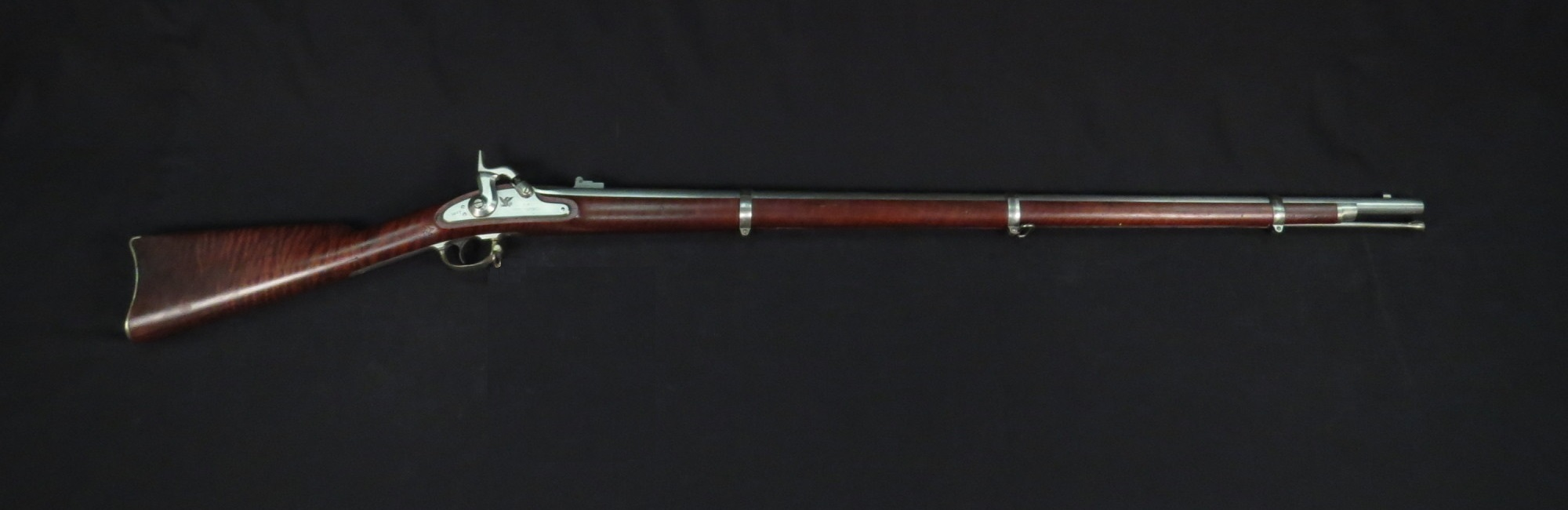
- Type: Rifled musket
- Place of origin: United States

Service history
- In service: 1863–1865
- Used by: United States; Confederate States; Canada
- Wars: American Civil War; American Indian Wars; Fenian raids

Production history
- Designed: 1863
- Manufacturer: Springfield Armory; Various private contractors
- Produced: 1863–1865
- No. built: c. 700,000
- Variants: Type I, Type II

Specifications
- Mass: 9 lb (4.1 kg)
- Length: 56 in (1,400 mm)
- Barrel length: 40.0 in (1,020 mm)
- Cartridge: Paper cartridge, Minié ball undersized to reduce the effects of powder fouling and for the skirt to get grip of the grooves when firing, round ball (conversion)
- Caliber: .58 (14.7320 mm)
- Action: Percussion lock
- Rate of fire: User dependent; usually 2 to 4 rounds per minute
- Muzzle velocity: 1,000 ft/s (300 m/s) to 1,400 ft/s (430 m/s)
- Effective firing range: 200 to 400 yd (180 to 370 m)
- Maximum firing range: 800 to 1,000 yd (730 to 910 m)
- Feed system: Muzzle-loaded
- Sights: Open sights

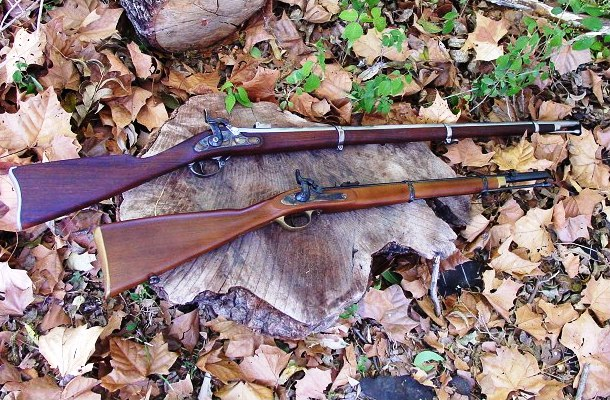
Springfield Model 1863 rifled musket and Enfield Pattern 1861 musketoon

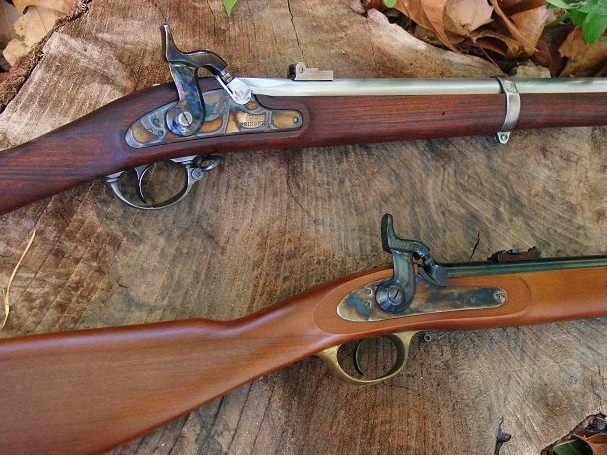
Springfield and Enfield lockplates

The Springfield Model 1863 was a .58 caliber rifled musket manufactured by the Springfield Armory and independent contractors between 1863 and 1865.

== Overview ==
The Model 1863 was only a minor improvement over the Springfield Model 1861. As such, it is sometimes classified as just a variant of the Model 1861. The Model 1861, with all of its variants, was the most commonly used longarm in the American Civil War, with over 1,000,000 manufactured.

== History ==
The Model 1863 also has the distinction of being the last muzzle-loading longarm produced by the Springfield Armory. It fired via percussion lock, which was much more reliable and weather resistant compared to the older flintlock muskets.

The Model 1863 was produced in two variants. The Type I eliminated the band springs and replaced the flat barrel bands with oval clamping bands. It also featured a new ramrod, a case-hardened lock, a new hammer, and a redesigned bolster (percussion chamber). Several of these modifications were based upon Colt's contract Model 1861, known as the "Colt special". 273,265 Type I variants were manufactured in 1863.

The new unit cost 18 to 20 dollars in 1864, and Massachusetts paid $18.73 for each musket

The Type II is sometimes referred to as the Model 1864, but is more commonly referred to as just a variant of the Model 1863. This version re-introduced band springs, replaced the clamping bands with solid oval bands, and replaced the three leaf rear sights with single leaf sight. A total of 255,040 of these were manufactured from 1864 to 1865.

The M1863 sometimes converted into a contract smoothbore musket, which was used for hunting and as a last line of defense for artillery soldiers.

By the end of the Civil War, muzzle-loading rifles and muskets were considered obsolete. In the years following the Civil War, many Model 1863 rifled muskets were converted into breech-loading rifles. The breech-loading weapons increased the rate of fire from three to four rounds per minute to eight to ten rounds per minute. The Model 1863 could be converted to breech-loading for about $5, at a time when a new rifle would cost about $15. The Fenian Brotherhood utilized Remington-manufactured Model 1863 rifles during the engagement; furthermore, several rifle muskets seized by the Canadian militia bear markings indicative of their subsequent deployment by the Canadian military.

The conversion of Model 1863 rifled muskets therefore represented a significant cost savings to the U.S. military. The military adopted various models like the Springfield Model 1865, Springfield Model 1866, Springfield Model 1868, and Springfield model 1870.

== Modern usage ==
The Miroku company made Minié .58 caliber rifled musket, a percussion muzzleloader made in Kochi, Japan (primarily 1970s–1990s) as a reproduction of the U.S. Springfield M1863, M1861, and other Ultra-High brand flintlock.

== See also ==
- Springfield rifle
- Springfield musket

Preceded by Springfield Model 1861	United States military rifle 1863–1865	Succeeded by Springfield Model 1865
