= 500 =

500 may refer to:

- 500 (number)
- 500 BC
- AD 500

== Buildings and places ==
- 500 Boylston Street in Boston
- 500 Brickell in Miami
- 500 Capitol Mall in Sacramento
- 500 Fifth Avenue
- 500 Renaissance Center, one of seven buildings in the GM Renaissance Center in Detroit, Michigan
- Tin Wing stop, Hong Kong (station code)

== Currency ==
- 500 kroner note, a 1972 Danish banknote
- 500 kroner note, a 1997 Danish banknote
- 500 Krooni, an Estonian banknote
- 500 kronur note, an Icelandic banknote
- 500 kroner note, a Norwegian banknote
- 500 kronor note, a Swedish banknote
- 500 yen coin, a Japanese coin
- 500 euro note, a Euro banknote

== Electronics ==
- Amiga 500, a home computer
- Amiga 500 Plus, a home computer
- Lenovo IdeaPad 500, a discontinued brand of notebook computers, same as Lenovo's IdeaPad 300
- Lenovo Yoga 500, a 2-in-1 PC
- Model 500 telephone

== Games ==
=== Ball games ===
- 500 (ball game), a ball game for children

=== Card games ===
- 500 (card game) based on Euchre
- 500 Rum, a variant of the rummy card game

=== Video games ===
- 500cc Grand Prix, a computer came on Atari ST
- Indy 500 (1995 video game)

== Lists ==
- Deloitte Fast 500, an award for high-growth technology companies
- Forbes 500, an annual ranking of the top 500 US companies by Forbes magazine
- Fortune 500, an annual ranking of the 500 largest US companies by revenue by Fortune magazine
- Fortune Global 500, an annual ranking of the 500 companies globally by revenue by Fortune magazine
- S&P 500, a US large-cap stock market index
- NME's The 500 Greatest Albums of All Time
- Rolling Stone's 500 Greatest Albums of All Time
- The 500 Greatest Songs of All Time, by Rolling Stone magazine
- The Rock and Roll Hall of Fame's 500 Songs that Shaped Rock and Roll

== Media ==
- 500 Days of Summer, a 2009 American romantic comedy-drama film
- 500mg, a solo project of Michael Gibbons of the band Bardo Pond
- "500 (Shake Baby Shake)", a song by Lush from their album Lovelife
- "500!", a storyline in the science fiction comedy webtoon series Live with Yourself!

== Military ==
- 500 Brigade, the Israeli Armor Corps
- 500th Air Refueling Wing
- 500th SS Parachute Battalion

== Roads and routes ==
- List of 500-series county routes in New Jersey
- 500 series bus routes, Sydney
- Bundesstraße 500
- Florida State Road 500

== Sports ==
=== Baseball ===
- 500 home run club

=== Cycling ===
- 500 meter track time trial

=== Motorsports ===
- 500cc, a subdivision of the MotoGP class in Grand Prix motorcycle racing
- 500 km Zeltweg, an Austrian racing event
- Adelaide 500
- Atlanta 500
- Atlanta 500 Classic
- Budweiser 500K
- California 500 (IndyCar)
- Cooper 500
- Daytona 500
- Ferrari Tipo 500
- Food City 500
- German 500
- Indianapolis 500
- Jack Link's 500
- Los Angeles Times 500
- Michigan 500
- Montana 500
- Monza 500 (Race of Two Worlds)
- Phillip Island 500
- Pocono 500 (IndyCar)
- Queensland 500
- Rockingham 500
- Sandown 500
- Southern 500
- VisionAire 500K
- Wellington 500
- Xfinity 500
- YellaWood 500

== Vehicles ==
=== Aircraft ===
- Cessna 500, an eight-seat business jet
- Eclipse 500, a small six-seat business jet

=== Automobiles ===
- Denza 500, a German-Chinese compact electric hatchback
- Ferrari 500 Superfast, an Italian grand tourer
- Fiat 500, an lineup of Italian small cars
  - Fiat 500 Topolino (1936–1955)
  - Fiat 500 (1957–1975)
  - Fiat Cinquecento (1991–1998)
  - Fiat 500 (2007) (2007–2020)
  - Fiat New 500 (2020–present)
- Ford Five Hundred, an American full-size sedan
- Lexus LC 500, a Japanese sports coupe
  - Lexus LC 500 GT500, a racing variant of the LC 500
- Mercedes-Benz 500, a series of German luxury cars
- Eunos 500, a compact executive car
- Tank 500, a mid-size luxury SUV
- Dodge 500, a heavy-duty truck

=== Trains ===
- 500 Series Shinkansen, a series of railroad trains operated by West Japan Railway Company

== Weapons ==
=== Guns ===
- Mossberg 500, a shotgun
- Smith & Wesson Model 500, a revolver
- Ultimate 500, a revolver

=== Gun cartridges ===
- .500 Black Powder Express (rifle)
- .500 Bushwhacker (revolver)
- .500 S&W Magnum (revolver)
- .500 Linebaugh (revolver)
- .500 Maximum (revolver)
- .500 Nitro Express (rifle)
- .500 S&W Special (revolver)
- .500 Wyoming Express (revolver)

== Other ==
- 500 Internal Server Error, an HTTP response code
- 500 kHz (or 500 kc), a radio frequency
- 500 year flood, a type of flood level
- International calling code for the Falkland Islands
- The 500 (I Cinquecento), the 500 Italian soldiers killed at the Battle of Dogali, 1887

== See also ==
- 500 series (disambiguation)
- 500s (disambiguation)
- 500th (disambiguation)
