= Junkers Ju 187 =

Proposed WWII dive bomber aircraft

Ju 187
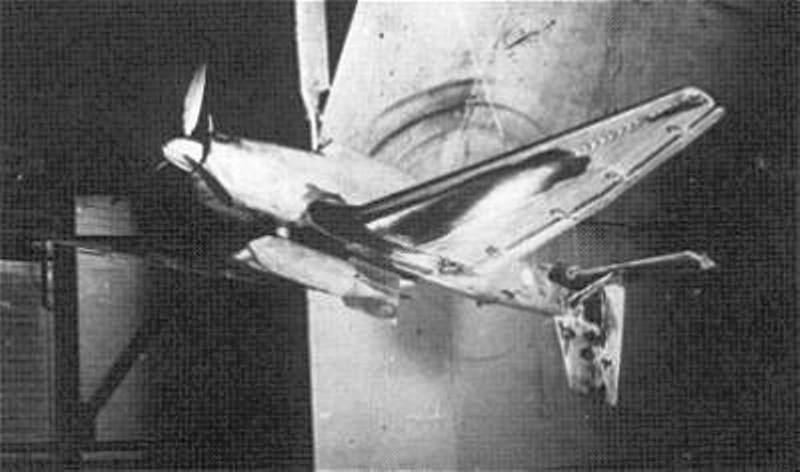

General information
- Type: Dive bomber
- National origin: Nazi Germany
- Manufacturer: Junkers
- Status: Abandoned
- Primary user: Luftwaffe (intended)
- Number built: 0

History
- Developed from: Junkers Ju 87

The Junkers Ju 187 was a German projected dive bomber designed to replace the aging Junkers Ju 87 Stuka. The Ju 187 project was cancelled in 1943.

== Design ==
By the time of the Battle of Britain, the Junkers Ju 87 Stuka had proved very vulnerable to enemy fighters and needed a replacement; after the rejection of the Ju 87F proposal, a new dive bomber was designed under the designation Ju 187.

The projected aircraft kept some of the features of the earlier Ju 87, such as the inverted gull wing and two-man crew. It would have added retractable landing gear, the nose of the aircraft would have been elongated for a better view for the pilot, as well as improved armour and armament. Most notably, the Ju 187 incorporated a rotating vertical tail. When rotated down, the tail would give the air gunner, armed with a rear turret, an unobstructed field of fire. It is not known how the aircraft would have handled with the tail rotated.

The Ju 187 project was cancelled by the Reich Air Ministry in the autumn of 1943 because the aircraft's projected performance, when fully loaded, was estimated to be no better than the latest Ju 87D variant (estimated maximum speed: 248 mph (399 km/h)).

== Specifications (Ju 187 estimated) ==
Data from Die Deutsche Luftrüstung 1933–1945 Vol.3 – Flugzeugtypen Henschel-Messerschmitt, Junkers aircraft and engines, 1913-1945, German aircraft of the Second World War

General characteristics

- Crew: 2
- Length: 11.8 m (38 ft 9 in)
- Wingspan: 18.06 m (59 ft 3 in)
- Height: 3.9 m (12 ft 10 in)
- Powerplant: × 1 Junkers Jumo 213A V-12 inverted liquid-cooled piston engine, 1,324 kW (1,776 hp) for take-off (1750 PS)

1,100 kW (1,480 hp) for climb and at 5,600 m (18,500 ft)

- Propellers: 3-bladed constant-speed propeller

Performance

- Maximum speed: 400 km/h (250 mph, 220 kn)

Armament

- Guns: * 2 × 20 mm MG 151/20 cannon in wing roots
- 1 × 13 mm MG 131 machine gun in dorsal turret
- 1 × 15 mm MG 151/15 cannon in dorsal turret
- Bombs: * 1 × 1,000 kg (2,200 lb) or 500 kg (1,100 lb) bomb in semi recessed bay
- 4 × 250 kg (550 lb) bombs on external wing racks
- 4 × 25 kg (55 lb) ventrally
