= .50 caliber handguns =

Heavy handgun bullet/handgun

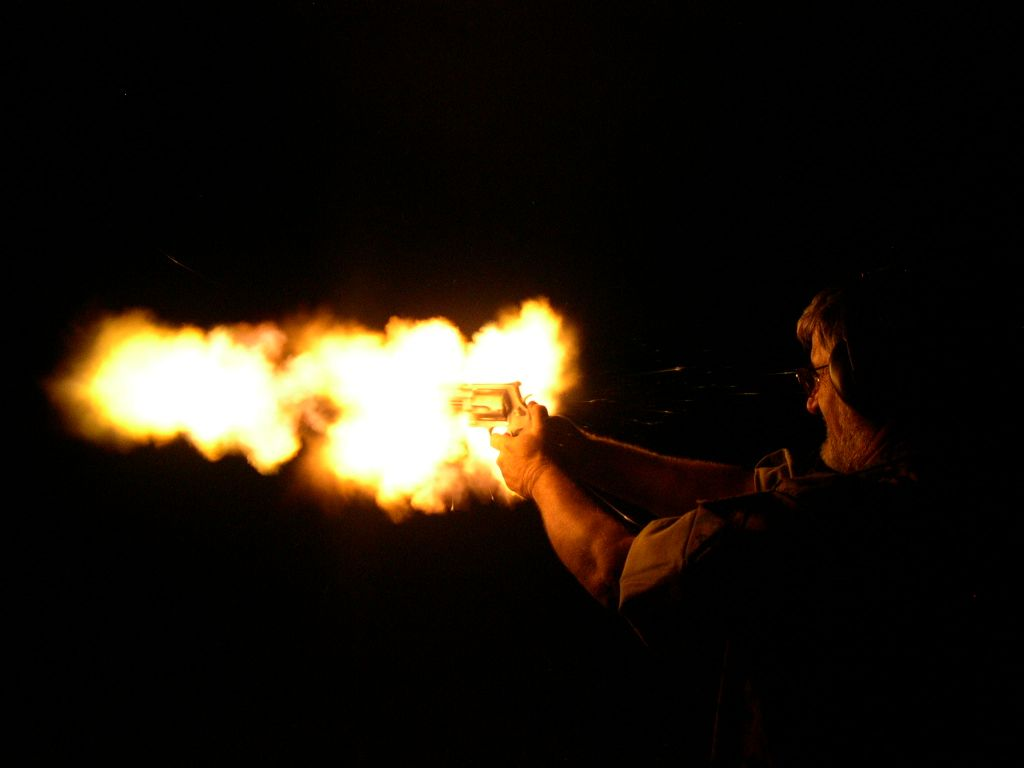
Muzzle flash and cylinder blast from a Smith & Wesson Model 500 fired at night

A .50 caliber handgun is a handgun firing a bullet measuring approximately 0.5 inches (12.7 mm) in diameter intended with the task of penetration. Historically, many black powder pistols fired bullets with diameters well above a half inch. However, following the development of smokeless powder, the focus shifted to smaller-diameter bullets propelled at higher velocities, and the development of .50 and larger calibers in handguns became uncommon.

In the twentieth century, several new cartridges of half-inch diameter were developed, the first by John Linebaugh of Cody, Wyoming, in 1986 with the development of the .500 Linebaugh, and then later with the .50 Action Express (1988), which was the first to achieve wide popularity. The .500 Linebaugh utilizes a bore diameter of .500" with the corresponding bullet diameter of .510", the same as the .50 BMG and other .50 caliber rifles, while the .50 Action Express, .500 S&W Magnum, and .500 S&W Special use .490" bore diameters and correspondingly smaller .500" bullet diameters. The smaller .500" diameter was further popularized by the development of the .500 S&W Magnum in 2003.

There are semi-automatic, revolver, and single-shot .50 caliber handgun designs. Handguns of this caliber tend to be larger and heavier than most others of their type with the exception of the Linebaugh line of revolvers. The Linebaugh revolvers are based on the standard Ruger Blackhawk with Ruger Bisley grip frames, although the cylinders have been enlarged for both structural integrity and absorbing the recoil associated with firing these rounds as have the previously mentioned .500 handguns.

Despite being featured in many video games and action films as the weapon of choice for some members of elite military and law enforcement units, these guns in reality are used primarily for hunting, target shooting, and silhouette shooting. Such military usage would be limited as a low-level anti-materiel weapon tasked with door breaching, shooting padlocks, or explosive ordnance disposal of unexploded ordnance, rather than combat.

== Examples ==
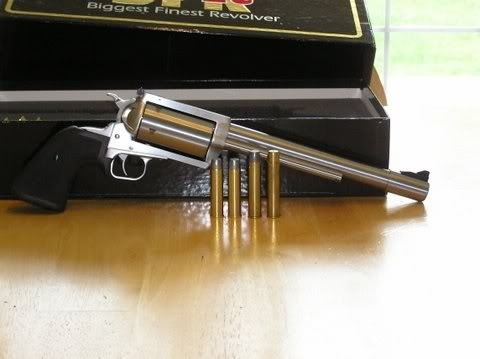
A custom made .50 Alaskan five-shot single-action revolver built on a BFR frame. The cylinder can also accommodate the 0.3 inch longer .50-110 Winchester cartridge. (Left: .50 Alaskan, Right: .50-110 Winchester)

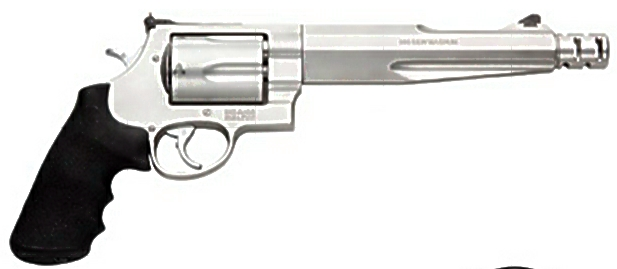
The largest commercially produced revolver: Smith & Wesson Performance Center Model 500 built on the company's X-Frame. This one has a 7.5 inch barrel. Bullet weights for commonly available ammunition vary from 275 to 500 grains; heavier custom cast bullets up to 700 grains for reloading are available.

=== .50 Action Express ===
- Magnum Research Inc. Desert Eagle
- Magnum Research BFR
- Arcadia Machine & Tool AutoMag V
- LAR Manufacturing Grizzly Mark V
- Freedom Arms Model 555
- Bond Arms Cyclops

=== .50 GI ===
- Conversions for the Glock 20/Glock 21
- Guncrafter Industries Model Nos. 1, 2, 3

=== 500 GNR ===
- Gary Reeder Custom Guns Ultimate 500

=== .500 S&W Magnum ===
- Smith & Wesson Model 500
- Taurus Raging Bull Model 500
- Magnum Research BFR
- JTL-E .500 S&W Magnum 12"
- Gary Reeder Custom Guns Ultimate 500

=== Other ===
- Ruger Bisley (.500 Linebaugh)
- Maadi-Griffin (.50 BMG)
- Magnum Research BFR (.50 Beowulf)
- Magnum Research BFR (.500 Bushwhacker)
- Freedom Arms Model 83 .500 WE (.500 Wyoming Express)
- Triple Action Thunder (.50 BMG)
- RSh-12 (12.7×55mm STs-130)
- WTS .50 (.50 BMG)

== See also ==
- 12 mm caliber
- Pfeifer Zeliska .600 Nitro Express revolver
- List of handgun cartridges
