= Marc Dreier =

American lawyer and criminal (born 1950)

- Born: Marc Stuart Dreier; May 12, 1950 (age 76)
- Education: Yale University (BA); Harvard Law School (JD)
- Occupation: Attorney
- Employer: Dreier LLP
- Known for: Fraud
- Status: Released early
- Criminal charges: Securities fraud Wire fraud Money laundering
- Penalty: 20 years imprisonment

Marc Stuart Dreier (born May 12, 1950) is an American former lawyer who was sentenced to 20 years in federal prison in 2009 for committing investment fraud using a Ponzi scheme. He was scheduled to be released from FCI Sandstone on June 30, 2025 but was released on December 12, 2024, when President Joe Biden commuted the sentences of almost 1,500 federal prisoners who had served home confinement. On May 11, 2009, he pleaded guilty in the United States District Court for the Southern District of New York to eight charges of fraud, which included one count of conspiracy to commit securities fraud and wire fraud, one count of money laundering, one count of securities fraud, and five counts of wire fraud in a scheme to sell more than $950 million in fictitious promissory notes. Civil charges, filed in December 2008 by the U.S. Securities and Exchange Commission, are pending. The 2011 documentary Unraveled states that "Drier stole over $740 million from 4 clients, 4 individuals, and 13 hedge funds".

He is the sole equity partner of the dissolved law firm Dreier, LLP. After Dreier was suspended from the New York Bar on December 23, 2008, the New York Supreme Court formally disbarred him on October 8, 2009, effective nunc pro tunc to May 11, 2009. He had been admitted on May 5, 1976.

== Early life, education, and career milestones ==
Marc Dreier grew up on the south shore of Long Island in an affluent area known as the Five Towns. His father, Sidney Dreier (1915-2006) was a war refugee from Poland, owned a chain of movie theaters. His mother, Mildred Dreier (née Krisoff; 1920-2019), was originally from Brooklyn where she was born to Lithuanian and Russian Jewish immigrant parents.

Dreier presided over the Lawrence High School student council, and graduated "most likely to succeed". He graduated from Yale University in 1972 with a Bachelor of Arts and earned a Juris Doctor from Harvard Law School in 1975. He began his career as a "shining star" in the late 1970s at Rosenman & Colin, Freund, Lewis & Cohen, then a 90-lawyer litigation firm, and was well regarded. "He was a very smart, hard-working guy....Funny, personable – part of the social mix", but what most distinguished him was his ability to think on his feet. "He's very quick. Very smart."

In the early 1980s, Dreier was named a partner at Rosenman. In 1987, he married a Rosenman associate named Elisa Peters. He and his wife separated in 2000, around the time that Dreier broke with a partner and started his own firm. His wife filed for divorce in January 2002. Dreier has since stated that only he was to blame, saying, "I wasn’t attentive enough to my family."

In 1989, he joined the New York office of Fulbright & Jaworski. Dreier would become co-head of litigation in New York, but when Dreier left Fulbright in March 1995, there were only ten New York litigators. He then worked for Duker & Barrett for less than two years. Its founding partner, William Duker, would later plead guilty to four counts of fraud called "one of the most serious cases of legal fraud" ever prosecuted. In 1996, he teamed with a Florida lawyer named Neil Baritz, who had a small corporate and securities practice, to found a firm called Dreier & Baritz. Though he was able to found the firm, a precursor to Dreier LLP, he struggled to distinguish his practice.

From 1999 to 2002, Dreier, Baritz, & Federman was formed with offices in New York and Boca Raton with most associates in Oklahoma. Dreier ran the new firm's already leased Park Avenue office. He favored plaintiff class-action lawsuits, which brought in large revenue. Federman had problems with Dreier's spending, managerial style, and secrecy, which culminated in a lawsuit.

Dreier, pushing to impress, acquired expensive trappings, buying a house in Westhampton. He bought first a place in Quogue, then the house next door. He purchased the $18 million 121-foot (37 m) yacht Seascape, which included a crew of 10 and a Jacuzzi, and docked it in New York City and St. Martin. Dreier owned a waterfront home in the Hamptons, a Manhattan triplex, and a penthouse on Ocean Avenue in Santa Monica, California, which he leased out. He drove a Mercedes 500 in New York and an Aston Martin in California. He was a member of the Harmonie Club and maintained a high profile at charity events.

== Dreier LLP ==
In 2006, Dreier founded his own firm with offices in five cities, promising lavish compensation. The headquarters at 499 Park Avenue had $30 million to $40 million worth of art, including works by Picasso and a Warhol depiction of Jacqueline Kennedy Onassis.

Dreier operated like a corporation and not like a partnership. Marc Dreier was the sole equity partner owner, controlled all of the firm's finances, and handled all administrative functions. There was no executive committee and no partners meetings. All deals were structured so that only he knew all the specifics and had access to all accounts. Dreier convinced lawyers that such an arrangement was best by emphasizing that it would allow them to concentrate on law while he worried about running the firm. He hired lawyers on three-year contracts, fixing their salaries and paying bonuses based on the fees each lawyer brought in. According to court filings, some lawyers received more than $50,000 in salary every two weeks.

In 2007, Dreier expanded to Los Angeles and brought in Hollywood superstar lawyer Stanton "Larry" Stein, whose clients included Mary-Kate and Ashley Olsen and Hilary Duff. The expansion boosted Dreier LLP's revenue from $60 million in 2006 to $90 million in 2007. Despite the burgeoning volume of business, the office actually operated at a net loss of approximately one million dollars a month. On January 27, 2009, Paul S. Anik, a partner at Dreier Stein Kahan Browne Woods George, LLP died from a sudden stress-related heart attack at 54.

On September 28, 2008, New York Magazine stated that 20 attorneys of the firm and its affiliates were selected for inclusion in "New York Super Lawyers, 2008 Edition" by Law & Politics, the legal publisher and independent researcher of multiple nationwide surveys. In 2007, 16 attorneys were named.

Dreier's two children were on his payroll, and he spent $10 million of the firm's money at New York's Gagosian Gallery in 2008.

In March 2009, the law firm Fox Rothschild acquired Pastore Osterberg, a firm in Stamford, Connecticut that was founded by Dreier attorneys in late 2008. Joe Pastore and Eric Osterberg joined along with seven other Dreier attorneys. The practice focused on litigation, telecommunications, technology, securities, and intellectual property.

=== Traub Bonacquist & Fox ===
In September 2006, Dreier acquired a well-known bankruptcy law firm Traub, Bonacquist & Fox. Founding member and managing partner Paul Traub participated in several of the largest retail bankruptcies in previous years, including Kmart, FAO Schwarz Inc., KB Toys Inc., Stage Stores, Office Max, and eToys.com. During his legal career, Traub has had his own ethical controversies, especially conflict of interest issues which continue to shadow him. Traub became a Dreier partner, earning in the range of $1 million or more, and was co-chair, with Norman Kinel, of the bankruptcy practice. On December 5, 2008, Traub sent a letter to clients announcing that he and other bankruptcy lawyers had resigned from the firm, but would continue to practice together as their former partnership, Traub, Bonacquist & Fox LLP. "In light of recent developments, of which we were unaware until yesterday, we have resigned from Dreier LLP, effective immediately", the letter states.

In February 2009, Epstein, Becker & Green, a firm specializing in government contracts, brought the seven-member Traub/Dreier bankruptcy team into their New York office, which included Paul Traub, Steven E. Fox, Wendy G. Marcari, and Maura I. Russell. Associates included Brett J. Nizzo, Anthony B. Stumbo, and Bradford Tobin. The firm has 400 attorneys based in eleven US cities. As of December 2008, Harold F. Bonacquist, a passive partner, is a political attaché at the United States Consulate in Istanbul, Turkey.

=== Sheldon Solow ===
From 1998 to 2006, Dreier handled much litigation for Sheldon Solow, a billionaire real estate dealmaker. The most recent case was the unsuccessful eviction of Bank of America Securities LLC from his flagship Manhattan building, 9 West 57th St., on the dubious grounds that one of the bank's brokers had been accused of illegal trading.

In 2000, Solow decided to litigate for ownership of a $10 million oceanfront house in East Hampton. Peter Morton, co-founder of the Hard Rock Cafe restaurant chain, had signed a contract to purchase the home from Dr. Gary Feldstein. Solow tried to break their contract and buy the place himself. Years of litigation ensued. Dreier filed suits in state courts in Manhattan and Suffolk County, in federal court in both the Eastern and Southern Districts of New York, in bankruptcy court in Florida, and in several corresponding appellate courts. "He had a certain glibness, this certainty that he could get away with that which other lawyers couldn't", says Feldstein's lawyer, Kevin Smith, whom Dreier named as a defendant in one of the suits. "He was like Gatsby without the charm." In 2003, the United States Court of Appeals for the Second Circuit, citing their "extensive history of persistent, repetitive, and vexatious litigation", ordered Solow and Dreier to pay double costs to Morton and Feldstein. The litigation cost Solow an estimated $6 million in legal fees, much of it going to Dreier.

In February 2004, advertisements labeled "legal notices" ran in The New York Times and the New York Post. The bogus ads, a costly embarrassment, informed "all unsecured creditors" in developer Peter Kalikow's 1994 Chapter 11 reorganization that they "might have additional rights of recovery" because of Kalikow's failure "to make truthful disclosure". More than 50 calls and 18 faxes came in to the Evergence Capital Advisors, Inc., by creditors. Evergence was a Florida corporation run by Kosta Kovachev, a Belgrade-born, one-time Morgan Stanley broker facing SEC charges for his participation in a $20 million Ponzi scheme, for which he ultimately paid the SEC $358,148 in penalties and interest. The Evergence phone and fax numbers went directly to telephone lines at 499 Park Ave. – the offices of Dreier, LLP. It was Dreier who had purchased the newspaper ads, using Evergence and Kovachev as a front. After Manhattan federal bankruptcy court Judge Burton Lifland, who oversaw Kalikow's bankruptcy and presided in the Madoff Investment Scandal bankruptcy, ordered Dreier to disclose his client's identity, it became clear that Solow had hired Dreier to place the ads. Lifland ordered Dreier and Solow to pay about $300,000 in sanctions to Kalikow. Those sanctions were eventually overturned on technical grounds.

In November 2008, Dreier claimed that Solow was looking to raise $500 million by selling short-term, high-interest notes, which were supported by an audit report that Dreier had forged. The report had been used to try to dupe a hedge fund, Whippoorwill Associates, into buying bogus Solow Realty promissory notes. On October 15, fund managers, who had bought $115 million of the notes in 2006 or 2007, demanded a meeting at Solow's offices when they weren't repaid on schedule. Dreier arranged it, with Kovachev posing as Solow's CEO. In October 2008, Dreier sent a Connecticut hedge fund's managing director documents that he said were Solow's audited financial statements, and the fund bought a forged $25 million note for $13.5 million. Dreier sent a New York hedge fund the same documents he'd given the Connecticut fund, but portfolio managers wanted more information. Dreier forwarded four e-mails that purported to be from other funds that had purchased Solow notes, as well as a Dreier LLP opinion letter vouching for the notes. A portfolio manager subsequently asked to speak directly to someone at Solow Realty. Dreier scheduled a conference call for October 23, and provided a telephone number located in the conference room at Dreier LLP's offices in Stamford, Connecticut. Kovachev got on the phone and, pretending to be Solow CEO Steven Cherniak, answered questions about the notes and Solow's finances. The next day the hedge fund bought about $100 million in notes. Both the Connecticut and New York funds were dubious and brought their doubts to Solow Realty and its audit firm. In November, one hedge fund manager told Dreier that he'd called Solow Realty and copied him on an e-mail to Solow about the notes. Solow's attorneys subsequently contacted federal authorities, that Dreier might be engaged in financial fraud.

=== Client list ===
More than 200 creditors have filed a total of more than $450 million in claims. Eton Park Capital Management seeks over $84 million and Fortress Credit Opportunities, part of Fortress Investment Group, has filed a $61.9 million unsecured claim. Ex-law partner Bruce F. Bronster is seeking $767,000 and entertainment attorney Lisa Bonner is claiming $448,365.

More than 800 pages of clients were named as "creditors holding unsecured non-priority claims" and were filed in a New York court. Some of these clients include Bill Cosby, Tim Burton, Justin Timberlake, the music groups the Virgins, the Dead Trees and the Black Angels, production company Monkey Dog Music, Harry Connick, Jr., Elvis Costello, Jon Bon Jovi, Diana Krall, 50 Cent, Echo & the Bunnymen and companies representing the Doors, the B-52's, and the Ramones. Sports figures include baseball players Andy Pettitte and Sammy Sosa, tennis star Maria Sharapova, and hockey player Kevin Weekes. Sports teams Manchester United F.C., the New York Mets, and the Major League Baseball Players Association were also among the clients.

In March 2008, Dreier sued client Judith Regan, claiming she owed the firm fees in connection with her $100 million defamation and breach of contract suit against her former employer, News Corp.'s HarperCollins Publishers LLC. On December 9, 2008, Regan claimed Dreier tried to extort a settlement from her and improperly disclosed her $10.75 million settlement with HarperCollins.

== Criminal fraud case ==
In January 2009, Dreier was charged in an eight-count indictment. Saying Dreier's deception began in 2004, it said he gave the purchasers of his notes false financial statements, arranged meetings for investors with people who impersonated officials from purported issuers of the notes, sold fake promissory notes purportedly issued by a Canadian pension plan, and embezzled more than $400 million from his client escrow account.

On February 5, 2009 U.S. District Judge Jed Rakoff in Manhattan had written in a brief that a total of 10 conditions set for the release Marc Dreier "will be sufficient to reasonably assure the defendant's appearance in court as required". Dreier had been initially released on bail on February 13, 2009.

An amended indictment on March 17, 2009, added an eighth count of money laundering to the charges and $700 million in forfeitures. From 2004 to December 2008, Dreier "sold to funds and others approximately $700 million worth of Fake Developer Notes and Fake Pension Plan Notes". The case number is: S1 09Cr085.

It was suggested that Dreier could have faced criminal charges in Canada for impersonating an in-house lawyer at the Ontario Teachers' Pension Plan in connection with an attempted sale of financial instruments worth US$44.7 million, for which he was arrested. He was released on bail, only to be arrested again by U.S. authorities upon returning to New York.

He issued a formal bail order on February 9, 2009, that Dreier be freed on $10 million bond, under 24-hour house arrest with armed guards and electronic monitoring. Judge Rakoff noted prosecutors had demonstrated, for the limited purposes of bail, that Dreier "is not only a master of deceit and a doyen of dishonesty, but the kind of person who, under stress, may resort to desperate measures" and his motive to flee was "palpable". The bail package proposed by Dreier's lawyers "goes far to minimize this risk". The bond would be co-signed by his son and mother, holding them responsible if Dreier were to flee. He also ordered that all means of communication, other than a land-line telephone needed for electronic monitoring, be removed from Dreier's apartment and that no visitors would be allowed without approval from the government.

U.S. Magistrate Judge Douglas Eaton modified his earlier ruling and set bond at $20 million, requiring Dreier to secure bail with $10 million in cash or property and include at least four co-signers, who would be required to pay the money if Dreier fled. Dreier also would have to submit to electronic monitoring and see a psychiatrist twice a week. He had asked to be freed on a $10 million bond and be subject to electronic monitoring. He said his mother and his 19-year-old son, Spencer, would co-sign the bond. Dreier was subsequently placed under house arrest and one of the court-appointed security guards monitoring him was a retired F.B.I. agent.

=== Guilty plea and sentencing ===
On May 11, 2009, Dreier said at a plea hearing, "I engineered a scheme to issue and sell fictitious promissory notes purportedly issued by companies in the United States and Canada", and subsequently pleaded guilty of swindling $380M USD from various hedge funds by selling worthless financial instruments without any plea agreement with the government.

At the hearing, Judge Rakoff said, "He has disgraced the honorable profession of law... There are 100 good reasons why Mr. Dreier should be jailed. By his own admission here today, he has shown that he is to be ranked with those who have committed some of the most egregious frauds in history." Ultimately, the judge ruled that Dreier remain free on bail pending his sentencing hearing on July 13, 2009.

On July 13, 2009, Dreier was sentenced to 20 years and ordered to begin his term immediately. Judge Jed S. Rakoff rejected the prosecutors' request of a maximum responding, "he is not Mr. (Bernard) Madoff from any analysis, and that's why I can't understand why the government is asking for 145 years". Dreier addressed the court, his family, his clients, and the lawyers who worked for him: "I'm sorry, deeply sorry, for the harm and the sadness that I have caused to so many people." The U.S. Probation Department had recommended a sentence of 25 years.

In a letter to the court, Dreier wrote: "I recall only that I was desperate for some measure of the success that I felt had eluded me. I lost my perspective and my moral grounding, and really, in a sense, I just lost my mind."

The United States Securities and Exchange Commission has also filed a separate civil suit against him for stealing funds from an escrow account belonging to one of the firm's bankruptcy clients.

=== Kosta S. Kovachev ===
Kosta S. Kovachev is the son of two doctors who emigrated from Serbia in 1964 and set up practices in New York City. He was born in Belgrade, educated at Columbia University and Harvard Business School, and joined Morgan Stanley in 1987. He left there after five years for a succession of smaller, obscure firms, then voluntarily gave up his broker's license in 2002. In 2006, he lost his broker's license from the National Association of Securities Dealers after being implicated in a $28 million Ponzi scheme. He refused to cooperate with investigators and eventually paid over $350,000 penalties and interest to settle the matter, while admitting no wrongdoing. Dreier was Kovachev's lawyer during that case.

Kovachev had no real address (since the address on his driver's license was a defunct post office box in Florida) and no formal job. His cellphone bills went to the Harvard Club. Twice divorced, he had a grown son in the US Navy from his first marriage and five children from a second marriage. He had known Dreier for at least a decade by 2008. While not an employee of Dreier L.L.P., Kovachev had an electronic pass to the 499 Park Avenue office, including its computers and offices.

On December 4, 2008, while Dreier was in a Canadian jail attempting to move cash from the law firm's accounts, Kovachev appeared at the law firm to pick up three paintings. There were only two paintings, and Kovachev took them and left.

On March 31, 2010, at a hearing before U.S. District Judge Naomi Reice Buchwald in Manhattan, Kosta S. Kovachev, 58, was sentenced to 46 months in prison and a fine of $215,000 (the amount Dreier paid him for the impersonations). On November 2, 2009, he pleaded guilty to committing securities fraud and wire fraud, as well as a wire fraud charge, and admitted to impersonating an accountant for Solow Realty & Development at Dreier's request in a meeting with investors at their Manhattan offices; and then, impersonating Solow's then-Chief Executive, Steven Cherniak at Dreier's request in a separate phone call with investors. Kovachev was arrested in December 2008. He was made to forfeit his services payment from Dreier for the caper: $215,000. Sentencing of upwards of five years was scheduled for March 5, 2010, along with more than $100 million in restitution.

On April 22, 2009, Kovachev was arraigned on new charges: conspiracy to commit securities fraud, securities fraud and wire fraud, adding a forfeiture allegation seeking to obtain money placed by Kovachev in four different bank accounts. Kovachev waived indictment and entered a plea of not guilty. In April 2010 Kovachev was sentenced to 3 years and 10 months in prison. Kovachev was paid $115,000 from the Dreier firm's operating account, and $100,000 from its attorney trust account.

The Case Number, dated December 18, 2008, is: USA v. Kosta S. Kovachev, 08 MAG 2792.

=== Robert Miller ===
On November 9, 2009, Robert Miller, 52, of Englewood, New Jersey pleaded guilty to conspiracy to commit securities fraud and wire fraud, as well as securities fraud, at a hearing before U.S. Magistrate Judge Ronald L. Ellis in Manhattan. He agreed to forfeit the compensation of $100,000 from Dreier in November 2008 for impersonating both a person at a Canadian pension plan, and, a few days later, a representative of an Icelandic hedge fund by telephone, to sell about $44.7 million in fictitious promissory notes. U.S. District Judge Kimba Wood sentenced Miller to two years' probation.

From 1983 to 1986, he was a staff attorney in the Securities and Exchange Commission's Enforcement Division, and from 1987 to 2008, he was an analyst and money manager. Between 1999 and 2008, he and Dreier managed an investment fund together.

== SEC civil charge ==
On December 8, 2008, the Securities and Exchange Commission charged Dreier with fraud in connection with an elaborate scheme that raised at least $113 million from the sale of bogus promissory notes. The complaint charges that since at least October 2008, Dreier marketed illegitimate promissory notes, including bogus notes of a New York–based real estate development company, to hedge funds and other private investment funds. He closed at least three sales, convincing purchasers the notes were genuine.

Dreier distributed fake financial statements and audit opinion letters of a reputable accounting firm and recruited assistance to represent legitimate companies involved in the transactions, including false e-mail addresses and telephone numbers. Dreier directed two purchasers of bogus notes to wire payment to his law firm's escrow account. At least one purchaser discovered the fraud and received the return of its investment, but approximately $100 million in known proceeds from the sale of the bogus notes is not accounted for. Dreier was offering fictitious promissory notes in the name of former client Solow Realty, a New York real estate development company. Since at least October 2008, Dreier approached at least three different investment funds with an offer to sell at deep discount various short-term unsecured promissory notes, ostensibly issued by Solow. Two investment funds agreed to purchase the notes (one fund purchased notes in two separate transactions) and forwarded payments of approximately $113 million to an account named "Dreier LLP Attorney Trust Account". A third fund was offered notes, but declined to participate. Each offer was accompanied by documents that Dreier later admitted were fabricated. Dreier offered the notes for sale even though he knew Solow did not issue them, had not authorized Dreier to market them, and knew nothing of their existence. Dreier gave the hedge funds fabricated documents including a "form" note and related agreements, "audited financial statements", and purported audit letters, which bore the forged signature of Solow's auditor, but which were printed on purported stationery of Solow's auditing firm. Dreier never told the representatives from the hedge funds that the entire marketing and sales plan was fictitious.

On December 8, 2008, the SEC filed declarations from firm controller John Provenzano and Dreier lawyer Norman N. Kinel. Provenzano detailed how millions of dollars were missing from client accounts. He stated that he was aware since he took his position in August 2005 of the disbursement of $30 to $40 million from Dreier accounts to purchase works of art. Dreier LLP maintained eight escrow accounts where client funds were commingled and eight other accounts for individual clients. Kinel e-mailed Dreier on December 1 requesting disbursal of $38.5 million from an escrow account on behalf of 360networks (USA) Inc., a client that emerged from bankruptcy in 2002. Dreier had remained counsel for the official committee of unsecured creditors in connection with 360's Chapter 11 bankruptcy and Kinel asked for the money to distribute to unsecured creditors, but only $19 million remained in the accounts. Provenzano recounted that in phone conversations with other firm partners, Joel A. Chernov and Steven R. Gursky on December 3 and 4, Dreier said that, were he not in custody, he could have returned to New York and sell some of his art so the money could be returned. On both days, Dreier, who was incarcerated in Canada on a charge of impersonation related to his dealings with the hedge funds, asked Provenzano to transfer $8 million and then $10 million from the escrow accounts into Dreier's own accounts, but Provenzano refused.

The case is SEC v. Dreier, 08-cv-10617 U.S. District Court for the Southern District of New York (Manhattan).

== Assets ==
The assets of Dreier LLP and its affiliates were frozen by court order. A Statement of Financial Affairs, filed on February 16, 2009, with the Southern District of New York U.S. Bankruptcy Court, disclosed that Dreier LLP had $59 million in assets and $42 million in liabilities, some $30 million of which is owed to creditors holding secured claims. In 2008, salaries for contract partners ranged as high as $1 million or more. Dreier, the firm's sole equity partner, received more than $6.5 million per year, and $375,000 was paid to his 19-year-old son, Spencer, over the course of two years. The figures were based upon an unaudited copy of the firm's books and records.

A 10-page list of property filed with the Court included five bank/investment accounts; Boats: "Seascape", 2005 Hessen Motor Yacht, 2008 Novorunia Equator Yacht Tender, Yamaha Waverunners (4); Cars: 2007 Aston Martin, DB9 Volante, 2006 BMW 650i convertible, 2000 Mercedes Benz S500 Sedan, 1997 Mercedes Benz SL500 Roadster; More than 100 works of Art: "Chair with Book on Red Carpet", David Hockney; "First Painting with Bottle", Roy Lichtenstein; "Blue Jackie", "White Jackie", "Jackie Profile Looking Down", Andy Warhol; "Portrait of a Girl", Pablo Picasso; "Grand Masque", Henri Matisse; "Big Thief", Tom Otterness, and a 2006 high-definition, Salma Hayek video by Soho photographer Robert Wilson; Real Estate: New York City condominium 151 E. 58th street; Hamptons homes: East Quogue (2), Sag Harbor; Anguilla, West Indies condominium (2).

After his arrest, Dreier attempted to transfer the two properties in the Hamptons, worth a total of US$12.5 million, to his son Spencer. Spencer asked the caretaker of the properties to file papers claiming that Dreier transferred his interest in the properties back in October, as a reward for agreeing to spend the summer with him. The caretaker declined to do so.

=== Chapter 11 bankruptcy ===
Mark F. Pomerantz of the law firm Paul, Weiss, Rifkind, Wharton & Garrison was named court-appointed receiver for Dreier LLP. On December 16, 2008, Pomerantz filed for Chapter 11 bankruptcy on behalf of the firm, declaring that "no effective management" existed at the firm after Dreier's arrest. Dreier was the sole equity partner of the firm. The firm owed malpractice insurance carrier Chubb Group of Insurance Companies more than $213,000 in unpaid bills by December 31, 2008, otherwise the $10 million insurance policy would expire and leave Dreier's 240 or so lawyers without coverage.

On March 26, 2009, Pomerantz disclosed he had recovered more than $100 million in assets, including $39 million in art; an $18 million 121-foot (37 m) yacht; homes in Manhattan; three properties in the Hamptons; parcels in Anguilla owned by Dreier or his family members; and five cars. The yacht Seascape, liquidation price reduced from $13.5 million to $12.5 million, was bought through the sale of fake notes. Dreier held stock certificates in an office safe, and stakes in a company called People Capital, as well as a startup bio-diesel firm in Argentina. He also controlled an investment vehicle called Armada Partners. However, "large amounts" were not collectible. Pomerantz's firm will be billing $1.4 million for its services.

On March 26, 2009, an auction held at the law office sold most of the firm's furnishings and accoutrements at rock bottom prices, with the exception of Dreier's furniture and paintings.

On July 21, 2009, his 34th floor, 3,000-square-foot (280 m^{2}) four-bedroom, five-bathroom Manhattan apartment, with massive outdoor terrace, was sold at auction for $8.2 million, about $2 million less than the $10.43 million he paid in 2007.

=== Chapter 7 involuntary bankruptcy ===
Sheila Gowan, the trustee overseeing the liquidation of the law firm, filed a Chapter 7 involuntary bankruptcy petition for Dreier on January 26, 2009. Wachovia Bank National Association and the bankruptcy estate of 360networks Inc also joined Gowan in the involuntary petition as creditors. The three said they were owed about $88.5 million.

Fortress Investment Group LLC, a private-equity and hedge-fund manager, lost $125.7 million buying phony promissory notes supposedly issued by Solow Realty & Development Co.. Hedge-fund firm Elliott Management Corporation lost $101.1 million; Eton Park Capital Management LP lost $84.4 million; Perella Weinberg Partners, $46 million; Concordia Advisors LLC, $22.3 million; Novator Partners, $20 million; and Meyer Ventures LLC, $13.4 million.

Dreier owed more than $40-million to various creditors, including many of the firm's lawyers. Chapter 7 Trustee Salvatore LaMonica, who was in charge of Dreier's personal bankruptcy case asked the bankruptcy court for permission to hire an auctioneer to sell off Dreier's three properties: the Upper East Side apartment and the two neighboring properties in the Hamptons.

== In popular culture ==
Unraveled, which includes interviews with Dreier and his son while Dreier awaited sentencing, was shown in the UK on BBC 4 on September 5, 2012, under the title "The $750 Million Thief", as a 1-hour 20 minute documentary in BBC-TV's series "Storyville".

American Greed, Episode 48, "Hedge Fund Imposter", profiled Marc Dreier and his crimes.

Marc Dreier's only television interview aired in 2009 on 60 Minutes titled "The Swindler", which was hosted by Steve Kroft. Dreier notes that he thought he would be featured on 60 Minutes for something good that he had done, not for something bad. Kroft asks Dreier a question that was asked of Bernie Madoff, who many people find similarities with, about how someone could have kept up a scam for so long. Dreier noted that he had multiple stressors simultaneously that kept up his focus: the scam, a legitimate law business (funded by the scam), and his work as a practicing attorney.
