= .50 GI =

Pistol cartridge

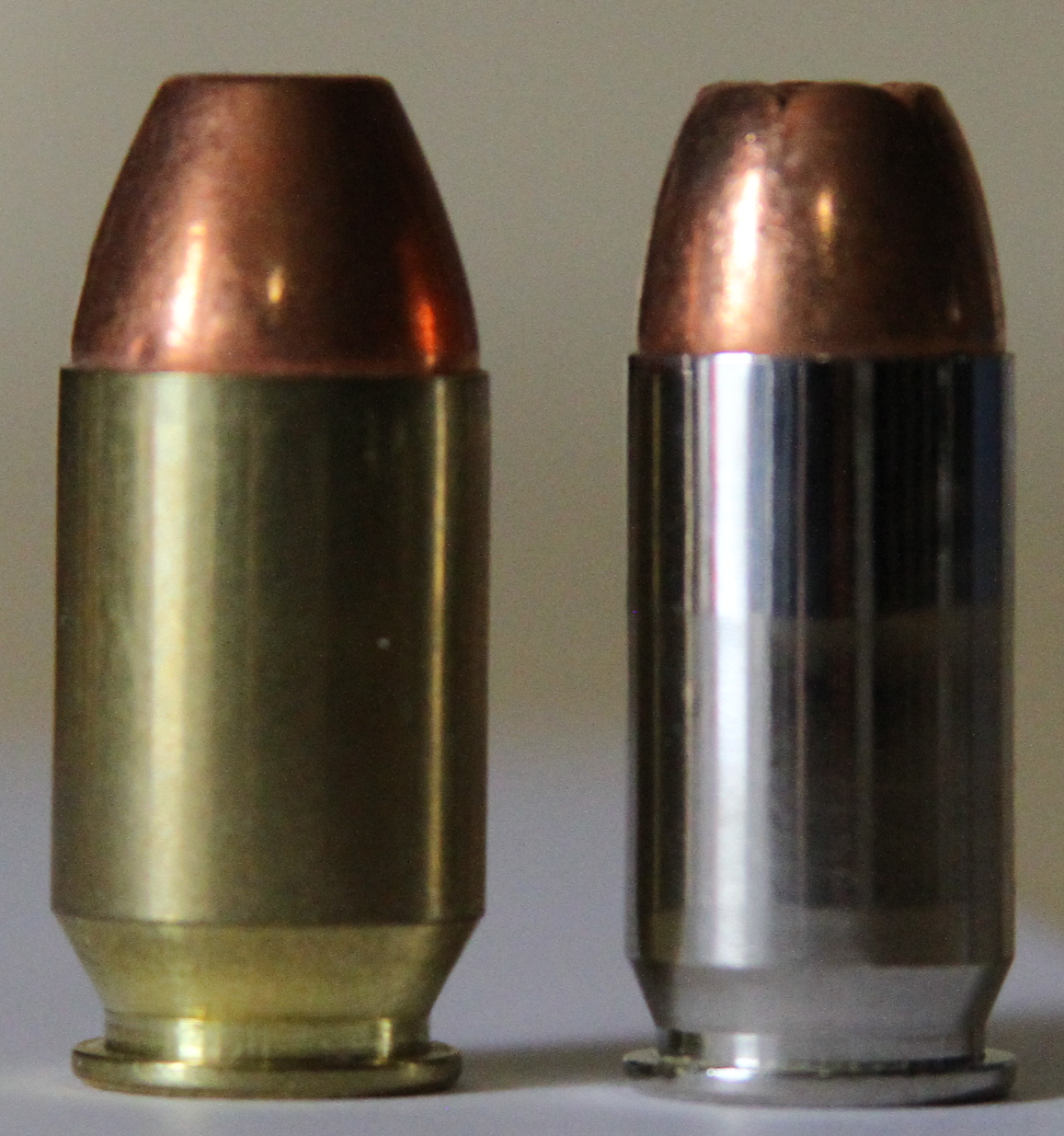
- A .50 GI (left) next to a .45 ACP cartridge.
- Type: Handgun
- Place of origin: United States

Production history
- Designer: Alex Zimmermann
- Designed: 2004
- Manufacturer: Guncrafter Industries
- Produced: 2004–present

Specifications
- Case type: Rebated, straight
- Bullet diameter: .500 in (12.7 mm)
- Neck diameter: .526 in (13.4 mm)
- Base diameter: .526 in (13.4 mm)
- Rim diameter: .480 in (12.2 mm)
- Case length: .899 in (22.8 mm)
- Overall length: 1.221 in (31.0 mm)
- Maximum pressure: 23,000 psi (160 MPa)

Ballistic performance
Bullet mass/type	Velocity	Energy
185 gr (12 g) SCHP	1,200 ft/s (370 m/s)	591 ft⋅lbf (801 J)
230 gr (15 g) SCHP	1,000 ft/s (300 m/s)	510 ft⋅lbf (690 J)
275 gr (18 g) JHP	875 ft/s (267 m/s)	468 ft⋅lbf (635 J)
300 gr (19 g) TMJ	700 ft/s (210 m/s)	326 ft⋅lbf (442 J)

The .50 GI (12.7×23mmRB) pistol cartridge was developed by Alex Zimmermann of Guncrafter Industries. The .50 GI was introduced at the 2004 SHOT Show alongside the Guncrafter Industries Model No. 1, a variation of the M1911. The round has a rebated rim that is the same diameter as that of the .45 ACP.

In 2006, Guncrafter Industries introduced its 1911 Model No. 2, which sports a full-length light rail/dust cover and is chambered for the .50 GI cartridge. Both the M1 and the M2 can be fitted with Guncrafter Industries' .45 ACP conversion unit. The .45 ACP magazines hold 8 rounds.

Physically, the .50 GI round is wider than the .45 ACP and slightly longer. The M1 and M2 magazines can hold seven rounds. The Glock conversion can hold eight rounds in the standard magazine and nine with the extended base pad.

== Performance ==
The .50 GI operates at pressures comparable to the .45 ACP, around 15,000 psi (100 MPa). Felt recoil is not unlike that of the .45 ACP. The .50 GI has developed a reputation for accuracy, though this may be due to the high precision of the semi-custom and very expensive Guncrafter pistols themselves. In one test, the 300 grain (19 g) jacketed flatpoint (JFP) gave a 25-yard group of 2.56 inches, and the 300-grain Jacketed hollow point (JHP) and 275-grain JHP gave a 25-yard group of 2.3 inches.

The penetration in gelatin (but not necessarily the kinetic energy) of the .50 GI is significantly different than the .45 ACP. While it is one of the few examples of the largest legally allowed calibers in a semiauto handgun, it was purpose built to have a recoil impulse and kinetic energy substantially less than the magnum .50 caliber rounds such as the .50 Action Express (semiautomatic) or .500 S&W Magnum (revolver). Factory-loaded ammunition has a kinetic energy of around 500 ft·lb.

The cartridge is not used in law enforcement and rarely for personal defense due to limited availability of ammunition and guns chambered for the cartridge. Currently, the only commercial handguns available in this caliber are Guncrafter Industries' own Colt 1911 handgun variants and its Glock 21/Glock 20 conversion upper receiver, and Magnum Research chambers their BFR revolver in this caliber on a custom basis.

=== Ballistics ===
- 185 gr (12 g) JHP, 1200 ft/s, 591 ft-lb, 222 power factor
- 275 gr (18 g) JHP, 900 ft/s, 495 ft-lb, 248 power factor
- 300 gr (19 g) JFP, 700 ft/s, 350 ft-lb, 210 power factor
- 300 gr (19 g) JHP, 860 ft/s, 493 ft-lb, 258 power factor

== See also ==
- .45 ACP
- .50 Action Express
- .500 S&W Magnum/.500 Auto Max
- .50 caliber handguns
- 12 mm caliber
- List of handgun cartridges
- List of rebated-rim cartridges
