= Guncrafter Industries Model No. 1 =

Caliber .50 GI, Model No 1.
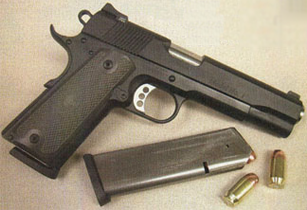
- A Model No. 1 handgun with a spare magazine and two .50 GI rounds
- Type: Semi-automatic pistol
- Place of origin: United States

Production history
- Designer: Alex Zimmermann
- Manufacturer: Guncrafter Industries
- Variants: Model No. 2, Model No. 3, M1911

Specifications
- Mass: 2.5 lb (1,134 g)
- Length: 8.5 in (216 mm)
- Barrel length: 5 in (127 mm)
- Cartridge: .50 GI
- Action: Locked breech, semi-auto
- Rate of fire: Semi-automatic
- Muzzle velocity: 875 ft/s (267 m/s)
- Effective firing range: 75 yd (69 m) (FM 23–35 of 1940)
- Feed system: 7 rounds (standard-capacity magazine)
- Sights: Heinie, fixed, 3-dot Trijicon

The Guncrafter Industries Model No. 1 (Or M1) is a variant of the widely popular M1911 handgun, modified for the .50 GI cartridge. John Browning's 1911 .45 ACP has been used for many cartridges over the past century. In every instance the cartridge used a bullet with a diameter that was the same or smaller than the original .451". Both the Desert Eagle and the LAR Grizzly have been offered in cartridges of .50 caliber. Both are large cartridges requiring a large, heavy pistol.

== Design ==
The Model No. 1 is basically an M1911 with external dimensions the same as a standard 1911, however it fires a .50 GI round.

Although the Model No. 1 is the same size externally, the slide will not fit on a standard 1911 frame as other modifications have been made to accept the .50 GI barrel and slide. However, it is possible to convert the Model No. 1 to .45 ACP, as a .45 ACP conversion unit is available for the .50 GI frame.

The .50 GI is not in the magnum class and works at the same pressures as the .45 ACP. The cartridge uses the same rim size as the .45 ACP and a .45 shell holder can be used for reloading.

This new brass is made by Starline Brass and is slightly shorter than a standard .45 ACP. The magazine well in the grip frame has thinner walls than a standard M1911 to accommodate the .50 GI's wider magazine, and the frame feed ramp is contoured with a more open radius for the larger-diameter .50-caliber bullet. Both are machined from heat-treated forgings, and the Model No. 1's hammer and sear are machined from tool steel.

== Variants ==
=== Model No. 2 ===
In 2006, Guncrafter Industries introduced its 1911 Model No. 2, which sports a full-length light rail/dust cover and is chambered for the .50 GI cartridge.

Both the M1 and the M2 can be fitted with Guncrafter Industries' .45 ACP conversion unit, the .45 ACP magazines hold 8+1 rounds.

=== Model No. 3 ===
Guncrafter Industries introduced a smaller version of Model No. 1 in 2010.

The Model No. 3 is a Colt Commander-sized 1911 also chambered for .50 GI, with a shorter barrel but with a full-length grip.

The M3 can also be fitted with a model-specific version of the company's .45 ACP conversion unit.

Like its bigger siblings, the M3 magazines hold 7+1 rounds of .50 GI and 8+1 rounds of .45 ACP.

== See also ==
- .50 GI
- List of .50 caliber handguns

== Other ==
- The fightin' .50 GI.: for those who only use a .45 because a 50 isn't available. by John Taffir. Guns Magazine 51.9 (Sept 2005): p44(4). From InfoTrac OneFile.
