= .55 Boys =

Anti-tank rifle cartridge

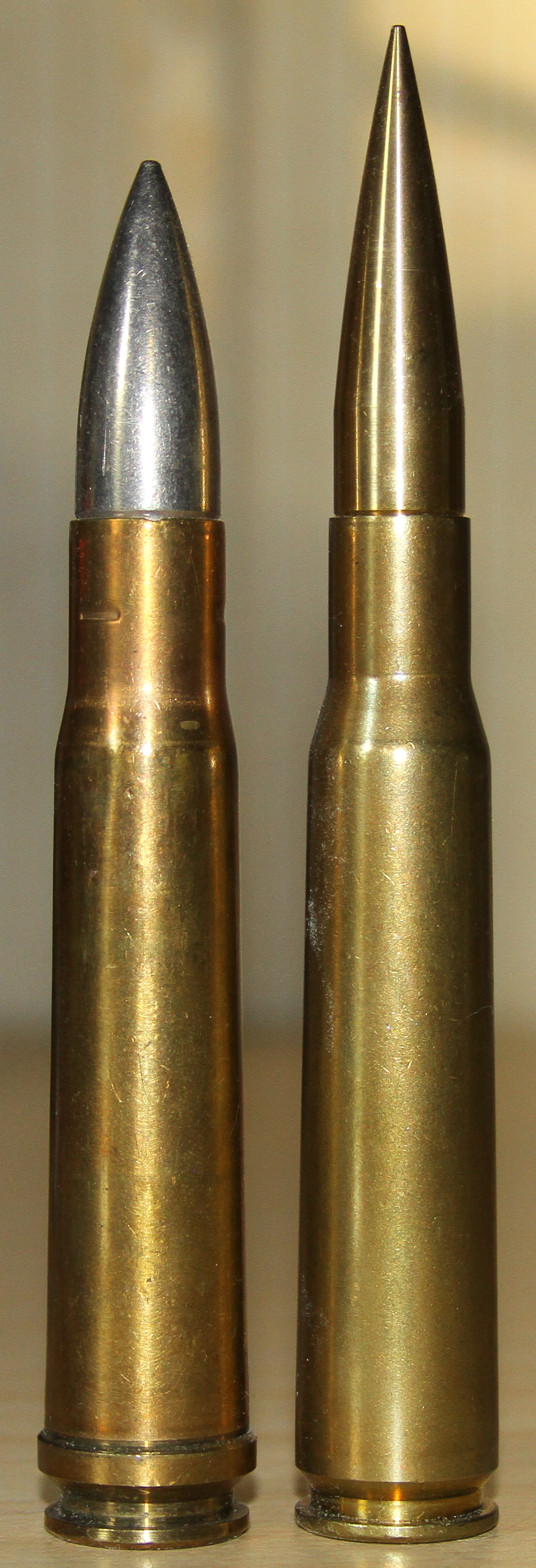
- .55 Boys cartridge (left) and a .50 BMG cartridge (right)
- Type: Anti-tank rifle cartridge
- Place of origin: United Kingdom

Service history
- In service: 1937–1945
- Used by: United Kingdom; Commonwealth of Nations; Finland, et al.
- Wars: World War II; Winter War; Continuation War

Production history
- Designed: 1937
- Manufacturer: Kynoch

Specifications
- Parent case: 13.2×99mm Hotchkiss Long
- Case type: Belted, bottleneck
- Bullet diameter: 14.3 mm (.565 in)
- Neck diameter: 15.392 mm (.606 in)
- Shoulder diameter: 15.34 mm (.604 in)
- Base diameter: 20.168 mm (.794 in)
- Rim diameter: 20.244 mm (.797 in)
- Rim thickness: 2.44 mm (.096 in)
- Case length: 97.79 mm (3.85 in)
- Overall length: 133.43 mm (5.253 in)

Ballistic performance
Bullet mass/type	Velocity	Energy
946 gr (61 g) Mark I	760 m/s	17,726 J
741 gr (48 g) APCR Tungsten	945 m/s	21,434 J
- Test barrel length: 914.4 mm (36 in); Sources: Ammo Encyclopedia, 2nd Edition by Michael Bussard

The .55 Boys (13.9×99mmB in metric) is an anti-tank cartridge used by the United Kingdom during World War II. It was designed for use with the Boys anti-tank rifle.

== Design ==
The .55 Boys is a 13.2×99mm Hotchkiss cartridge, necked up in the mid-1930s to accept a .55 caliber bullet. Since the case was left with less of a shoulder, a belt was added to ensure reliable headspacing. The .55 Boys performed poorly compared to contemporary foreign anti-tank rounds, such as the German 7.92×94mm Patronen (Note: A smaller tungsten-cored round fired from a case about the same size as the Boys) and the Soviet 14.5×114mm rounds. As a result, it was quickly deemed obsolete.

== History ==
The concept of a small arms round for use against tanks began with the German 13.2mm TuF round, designed during World War I to counter the first British tanks.

In the 1930s, the United Kingdom began designing an anti-tank rifle to address the threat posed by enemy armored vehicles in the event of a war.

The gun design was initially trialed using a .50 inch bullet with a belted case. Due to insufficient armour-piercing performance, the calibre was increased to .55.

Development of the .55 Boys was initiated by Captain Henry C. Boys, the assistant superintendent of design at the Royal Small Arms Factory, Enfield, in 1934. Boys died before the rifle was officially adopted, and it was named in his honour. The .55 Boys round was a modified .50 BMG round necked up to accept a larger, steel-cored bullet to increase armour penetration. A belt was added to reinforce the case due to the heavy propellant charge. (Note: It is incorrectly reported that the belt was added to prevent the round from being chambered in weapons designed for the .50 BMG, though a .55-calibre cartridge could not be chambered in a .50-calibre weapon to begin with.)

The .55 Boys was adopted and manufactured alongside the Boys anti-tank rifle in 1937 by firms such as Kynoch throughout the Commonwealth of Nations. When the United Kingdom entered World War II, the .55 Boys was soon found to be insufficient against even early war Axis tanks in late 1939 and 1940. However, the UK had to rely on the .55 Boys due to the lack of better infantry anti-tank weapons at the time. When the PIAT anti-tank weapon was introduced in 1943, its shaped charge proved far more effective against enemy armour than the .55 Boys. The Boys rifle was phased out of frontline service as the PIAT became the British military's primary handheld anti-tank weapon.

Although not highly effective as an anti-tank weapon, the .55 Boys was used until the end of World War II by British and Commonwealth forces. It also saw use during the Winter War and Continuation War by Finland. The Boys was issued to Home Guard units in the UK for use against "light armoured fighting vehicles... which the Home Guard are likely to have to deal with, certainly in the early stages of either an airborne or seaborne landing on our coasts." A handbook for its use noted that, in addition to the expected armour penetration at various distances and angles, it would penetrate 14 inches of brick wall and 10 inches of sandbags.

By the conclusion of World War II, the .55 Boys was no longer used in any major capacity.

== Variants ==
The .55 Boys round went through two major variants in its lifetime, along with an experimental variant that was never adopted by the United Kingdom.

=== Mark I ===
The first variant of the .55 Boys used a 926 gr (60.0 g) hardened-steel-core bullet with a lead sleeve, covered with a steel jacket. A ball and tracer version of this round was also developed, along with a practice round featuring an aluminium core to make it more suitable for training. It has a muzzle velocity of approximately 747 m/s (2,450 ft/s).

=== Mark II ===
An improved loading, known as the Mark II, was introduced to enhance the round's velocity and penetration. It achieves a muzzle velocity of approximately 884 m/s (2,899.5 ft/s).

At an optimal angle, the Mark II round was capable of penetrating 0.91 inches (23.2 mm) of armour at 100 yd (91 m), 0.82 inches (20.9 mm) at 300 yards (270 m), and 0.74 inches (18.8 mm) at 500 yards (460 m).

=== APCR tungsten round ===
An experimental armour-piercing composite rigid (APCR) .55 Boys round was developed in 1942. It featured a tungsten core instead of the steel core used in previous rounds, which significantly enhanced its penetrating ability and increased its muzzle velocity from the Mark II's 884 m/s to approximately 944 m/s (3,100 ft/s). This round differed from the Mark I and II rounds due to its two-part bullet design. However, it was never officially adopted, as more effective anti-tank rounds and weapons, such as the PIAT, were being introduced. Despite its improvements, the .55 Boys, even with the enhanced APCR round, was insufficient against the heavily armoured tanks of the Wehrmacht. Nevertheless, it remained effective against the more lightly armoured tanks of the Imperial Japanese Army in the Asian and Pacific theatres until the end of the war.

== See also ==
- 13mm caliber
- 14.5×114mm
- 12.7×108mm
- List of rifle cartridges
