= Triple Action Thunder =

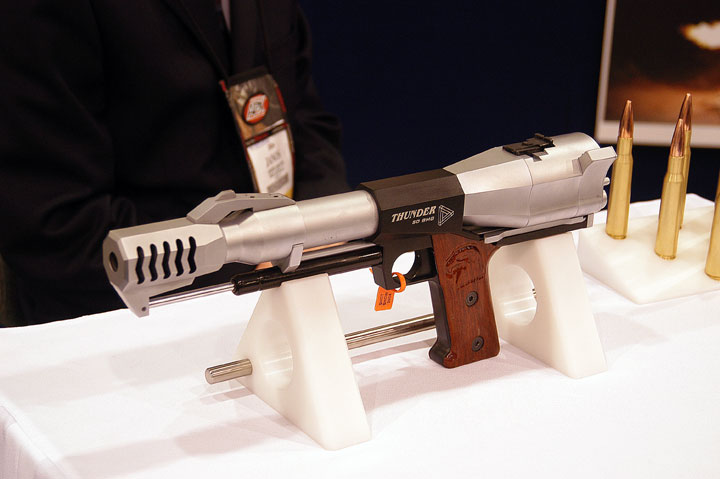
- Type: Breech-loading pistol
- Place of origin: United States

Production history
- Manufacturer: Triple Action LLC

Specifications
- Mass: 12 lb (5.44 kg) (unloaded)
- Length: 16.9 in (429.26 mm)
- Barrel length: 13.2 in (335.28 mm)
- Cartridge: .50 BMG
- Action: Breech-Loading single shot
- Feed system: Revolving Breech Lock

The Triple Action Thunder is a breech-loading, single shot handgun designed to fire the .50 BMG cartridge. It was developed by Triple Action LLC, an FFL based in Logan, Utah. It was introduced at the 2004 SHOT Show as a prototype, and never made it out of that stage. To help counter the strong recoil, the Thunder had a muzzle brake and a hydraulic recoil reduction system called the nitrogen recoil controller.

== See also ==
- .50 caliber handguns – Heavy handgun bullet/handgun
