= 14 mm caliber =

Firearm cartridge classification

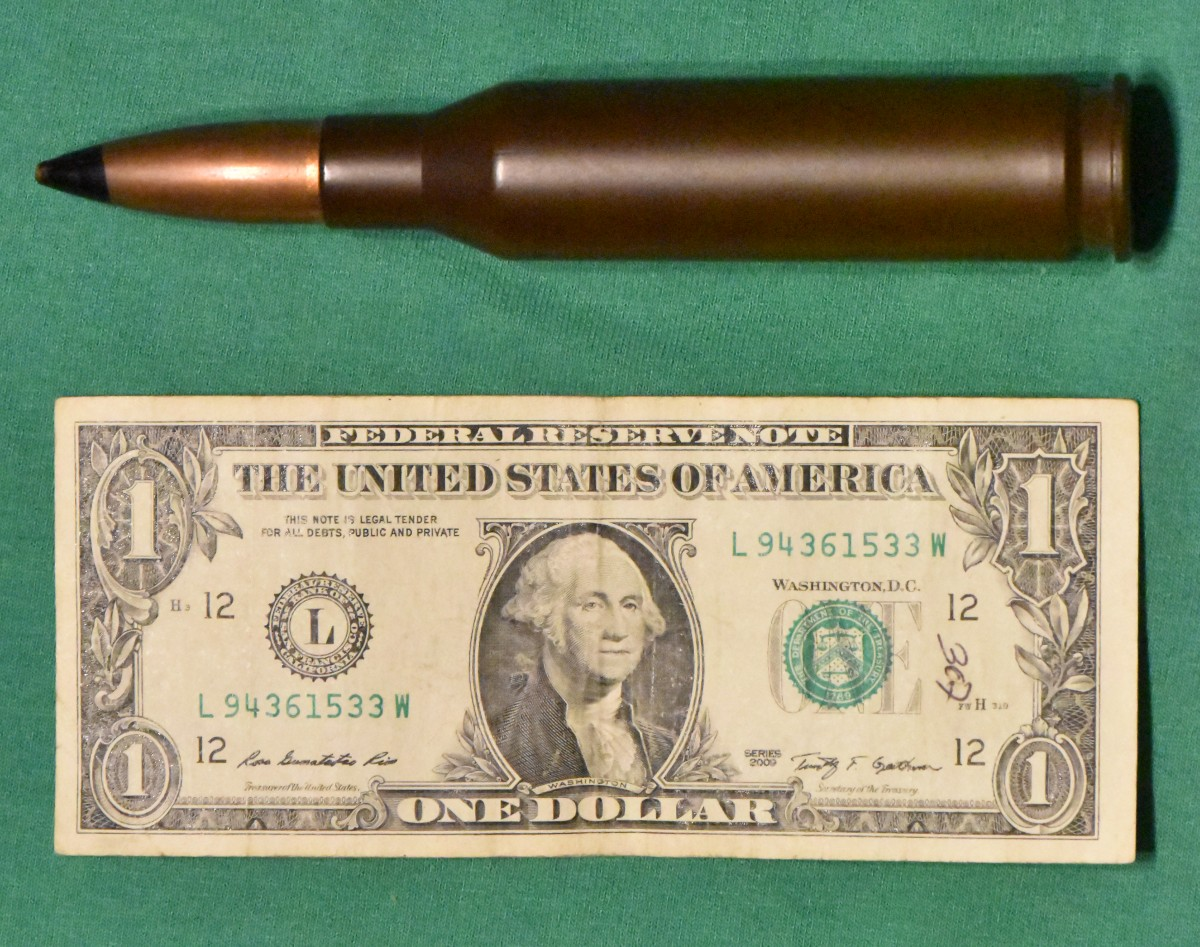
- 14.5×114mm cartridge next to a dollar bill
- Firearm cartridges
- « 12 mm, 13 mm 14 mm 15 mm, 16 mm »

This is a list of firearm cartridges which have bullets that are 14 millimetres (0.55 in) to 14.99 millimetres (0.590 in) in caliber.

The most famous military cartridge in the 14 mm caliber span is probably the Soviet/Russian 14.5×114mm cartridge, initially developed for various anti-tank rifles before WWII, and later on re-adopted as a heavy machine gun cartridge which continues to see widespread use in the 21st century.

== Cartridges ==
- Length refers to the cartridge case length.
- OAL refers to the overall length of the cartridge.
- Bullet refers to the diameter of the bullet.

All measurements are in mm (in).

Dimensions	Name	Date	Bullet diameter	Case length	Rim	Base	Shoulder	Neck	Cartridge length
14×22mmRF	.56-56 Spencer		14 (.550)	27.22 (.875)	16.38 (.645)	14.22 (.560)	-	14.22 (.560)	39.24 (1.545)
14×33mmR	Wänzl		14.28 mm (.5622 in)	32.42 mm (1.276 in)	17.48 mm (.688 in)	15.2 mm (.5984 in)	N/A	14.85 mm (.5846 in)	44.38 mm (1.747 in)
14.7×51mm	.577 Snider	1867	14.48 (.570)	50.8 (2.0)	18.97 (.747)	16.76 (.660)	15.29 (.602)	15.29 (.602)	62.23 (2.45)
14.9×94mmR	.577 Nitro Express	1890s	14.8 (.582)	76 (3)	19.0 (.748)	16.8 (.660)	N/A	15.4 (.608)	94 (3.7)
	.600/577 Rewa		14.8 (.582)	76 (3)	20.4 (.805)	17.7 (.697)	16.4 (.646)	15.6 (.613)	97 (3.83)
	.577 Tyrannosaur	1993	14.86 (.585)	75.946 (2.99)	17.475 (.688)	17.475 (.688)	17.094 (.673)	15.596 (.614)	94.234 (3.71)
	.585 Nyati		14.86 (.585)	70.866 (2.79)	14.88 (.586)	16.764 (.660)	16.510 (.650)	15.367 (.605)	89.535 (3.525)
14.5×114mm	14.5 mm Russian	1941	14.88 (.586)	114 (4.488)	26.95 (1.061)	26.95 (1.061)	25.5 (1.004)	16.5 (.650)	155.8 (6.134)
14.5×148mm			14.88 (.586)	148 (5.827)	-	-	-	-	-
14.5×218mm			14.88 (.586)	218 (8.583)	-	-	-	-	-
	14.5mm JDJ		14.9 (.587)	-	-	-	-	-	-
