= 500th =

500th may refer to:

- 500th anniversary, also known as a Quincentennial
- 500th (1st Wessex) Field Company, Royal Engineers
- 500th Air Defense Group, disbanded United States Air Force (USAF) organization
- 500th Air Expeditionary Group Constituted as 500th Bombardment Group
- 500th Bombardment Squadron, inactive United States Air Force unit
- 500th Brigade, also known as the Kfir (Young Lion) Formation, a regular-service tank brigade from 1972 to 2003
- 500th Fighter-Bomber Squadron, inactive United States Air Force unit
- 500th Heavy Anti-Aircraft Regiment, Royal Artillery, a Scottish air defence unit of Britain's Territorial Army
- 500th Military Intelligence Brigade (United States)
- 500th Raider Infantry Battalion
- 500th Simpsons episode or At Long Last Leave, the 14th episode of the 23rd season of the American animated television series
- 500th SS Parachute Battalion, the parachute unit of the Waffen-SS
- Emmerdale Village's 500th anniversary, Emmerdale being a fictional village in the Yorkshire Dales in a British soap opera

== See also ==
- 500 (disambiguation)
