= .50-110 Winchester =

American rifle cartridge

.50-110 WCF ( Winchester Center Fire )
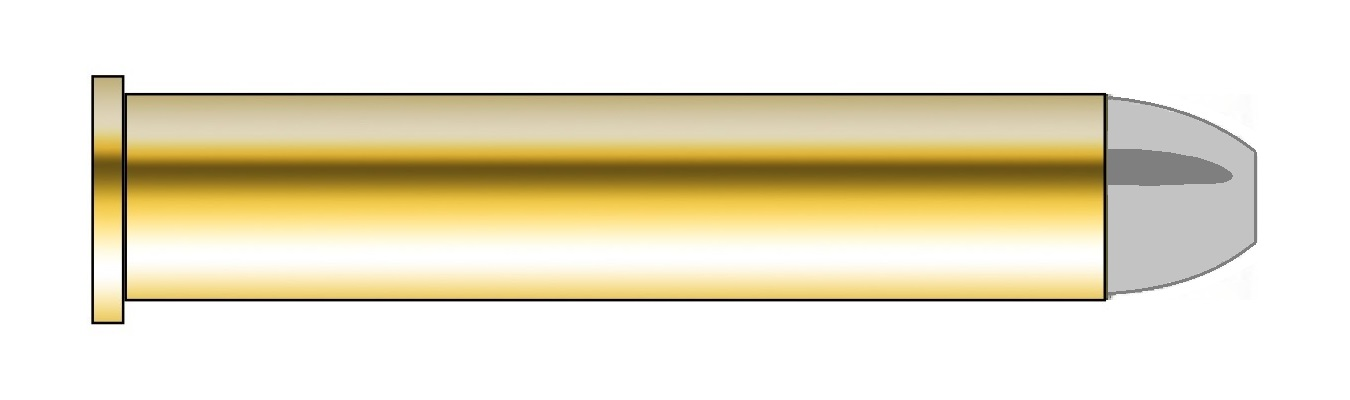
- Type: Rifle
- Place of origin: United States

Production history
- Designer: Winchester
- Designed: 1898
- Manufacturer: Winchester
- Produced: 1899–today, small quantities

Specifications
- Case type: Rimmed, straight
- Bullet diameter: .512 in (13.0 mm)
- Neck diameter: .534 in (13.6 mm)
- Base diameter: .551 in (14.0 mm)
- Rim diameter: .607 in (15.4 mm)
- Case length: 2.40 in (61 mm)
- Overall length: 2.75 in (70 mm)
- Primer type: Large rifle

Ballistic performance
Bullet mass/type	Velocity	Energy
300 gr (19 g) (black powder, .50-100 factory load)	1,605 ft/s (489 m/s)	1,720 ft⋅lbf (2,330 J)
285 gr (18 g) (black powder, solid)	1,600 ft/s (490 m/s)	1,710 ft⋅lbf (2,320 J)
450 gr (29 g) (black powder)	1,475 ft/s (450 m/s)	2,190 ft⋅lbf (2,970 J)
285 gr (18 g) (smokeless)	1,750 ft/s (530 m/s)	2,045 ft⋅lbf (2,773 J)
300 gr (19 g) (smokeless factory load)	2,225 ft/s (678 m/s)	3,298 ft⋅lbf (4,471 J)
- Sources: Barnes & Amber 1972

The .50-110 WCF (13×61mmR), also known as the .50-100-450 WCF (with different loadings), in modern 1886 Winchesters with modern steel barrels is the most powerful lever-action cartridge, with up to 6,000 foot-pounds (8,100 J) of energy.

== Overview ==
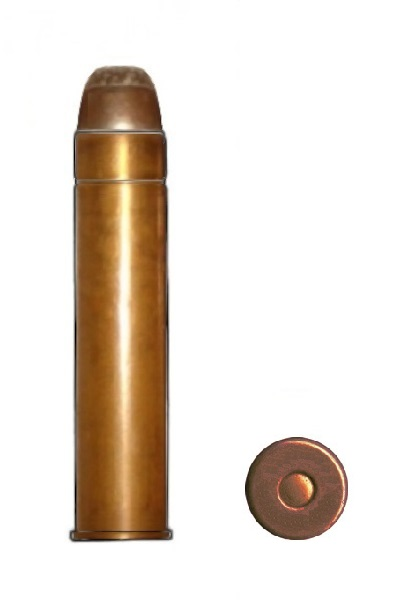
The .50-110 WCF.

Introduced in 1899 for the Winchester Model 1886 repeater, the .50-110 WCF was also available in single-shot weapons such as the Winchester 1885 Hi-Wall. Slight variations in charge weight in the same case led to the mistaken belief these were different rounds, when in fact they were not.

Designed for black powder, the .50-110 was also available in a potent smokeless loading, comparable to British elephant rounds. In power, the standard load was comparable to the contemporary British .500 Black Powder Express. It is sufficient for elk, deer, moose, and bear at medium ranges or in woods, and thin-skinned African game, but not dangerous animals such as elephants. The high-velocity smokeless load was in a class with the .444 Marlin, and its power exceeded the .348 and .358 Winchester.

Winchester continued to offer the cartridge commercially until 1935 and while it is still offered by some suppliers, due to its obsolescence and resultant obscurity, it is significantly more costly than more current cartridges — averaging from US$3 to $4 per round. Also, more modern guns like the new Browning 1886, 71 Winchester, and the new 1886 Winchesters, made in Japan, are capable of much higher pressures and the 50–110 WCF can achieve up to 6,000 foot-pounds (8.1 kJ) of energy.

== Dimensions ==
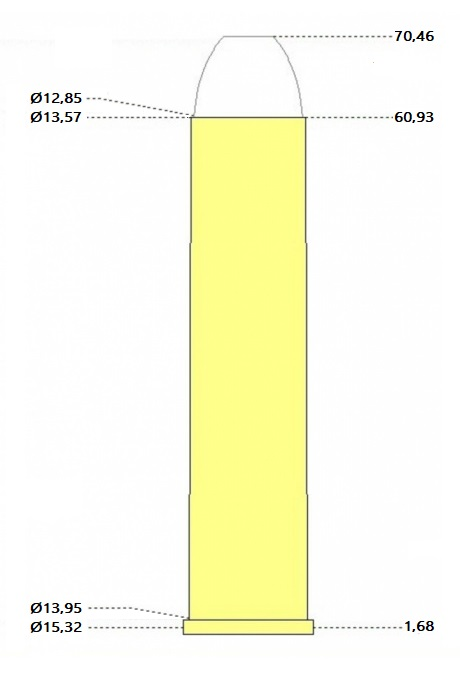

== See also ==
- List of rimmed cartridges
- List of cartridges by caliber
- List of rifle cartridges
- 13mm caliber
- .50-90 Sharps
- .50-140 Sharps
- .50-70 Government

== Sources ==
- Barnes, Frank C., ed. by John T. Amber. ".50-110 Winchester", in Cartridges of the World, pp. 116 & 124. Northfield, IL: DBI Books, 1972. ISBN 0-695-80326-3.
- ______ and _____. ".30-30 Winchester", in Cartridges of the World, p. 34. Northfield, IL: DBI Books, 1972. ISBN 0-695-80326-3.
- ______ and _____. ".577 Nitro-Express", in Cartridges of the World, p. 233. Northfield, IL: DBI Books, 1972. ISBN 0-695-80326-3.
- ______ and _____. ".500 No. 2 Express (.577/.500)", in Cartridges of the World, p. 230. Northfield, IL: DBI Books, 1972. ISBN 0-695-80326-3.
- ______ and _____. ".444 Marlin", in Cartridges of the World, p. 62. Northfield, IL: DBI Books, 1972. ISBN 0-695-80326-3.
- ______ and _____. ".348 Winchester", in Cartridges of the World, p. 52. Northfield, IL: DBI Books, 1972. ISBN 0-695-80326-3.
- ______ and _____. ".358 Winchester", in Cartridges of the World, p. 54. Northfield, IL: DBI Books, 1972. ISBN 0-695-80326-3.
