= Boys anti-tank rifle =

British anti-tank rifle

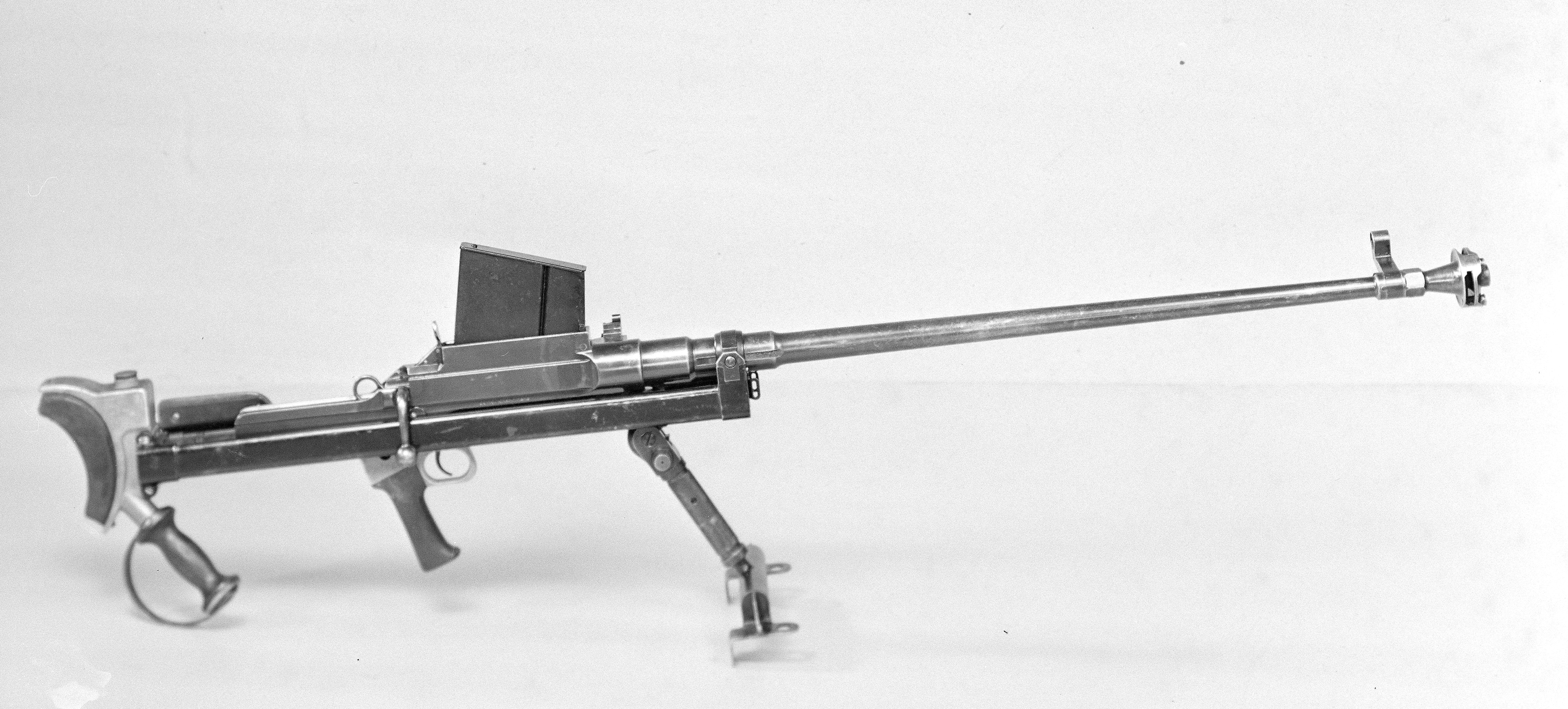
- Boys anti-tank rifle Mk I
- Type: Anti-tank rifle
- Place of origin: United Kingdom

Service history
- In service: 1937–1998
- Used by: See Users
- Wars: Second Sino-Japanese War; Winter War; World War II; Greco–Italian War; Continuation War; Hukbalahap Rebellion; Greek Civil War; 1948 Arab–Israeli War; Malayan Emergency; Korean War; The Troubles

Production history
- Designed: 1937
- Manufacturer: Royal Small Arms Factory
- Produced: 1937–1940
- No. built: ~62,000
- Variants: Mk I, Mk I*, Mk II

Specifications
- Mass: 35 lb (16 kg) unloaded
- Length: 5 ft 2 in (1.57 m)
- Barrel length: 36 in (910 mm); Airborne: 30 in (762 mm)
- Cartridge: .55 Boys (Kynoch & RG)
- Calibre: 0.55 in (14 mm)
- Action: Bolt-action rifle
- Rate of fire: ~10 round/min
- Muzzle velocity: Mk I: 747 m/s (2,450 ft/s); Mk II: 884 m/s (2,900 ft/s)
- Effective firing range: 100 yards (91 m): 23.2mm penetration at 90° 500 yards (460 m): 18.8mm penetration at 90°
- Feed system: 5-round detachable box magazine

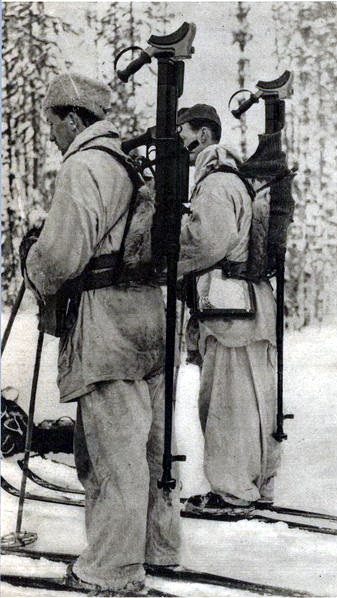
Swedish volunteers in the Winter War carrying Boys anti-tank rifles

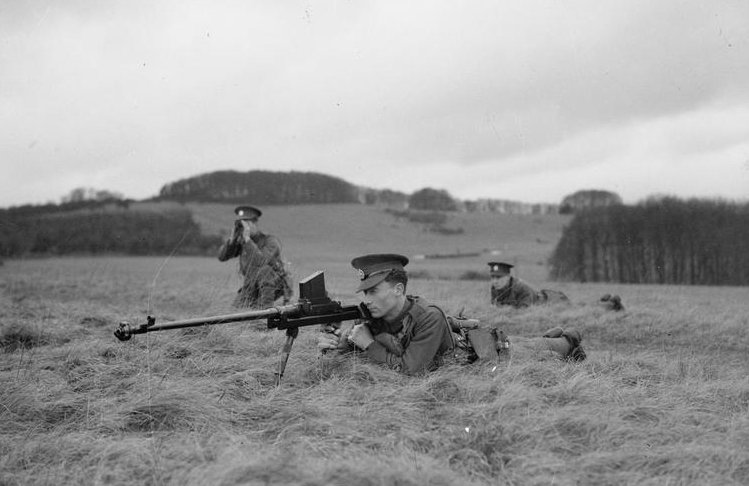
British soldiers training with the Boys anti-tank rifle

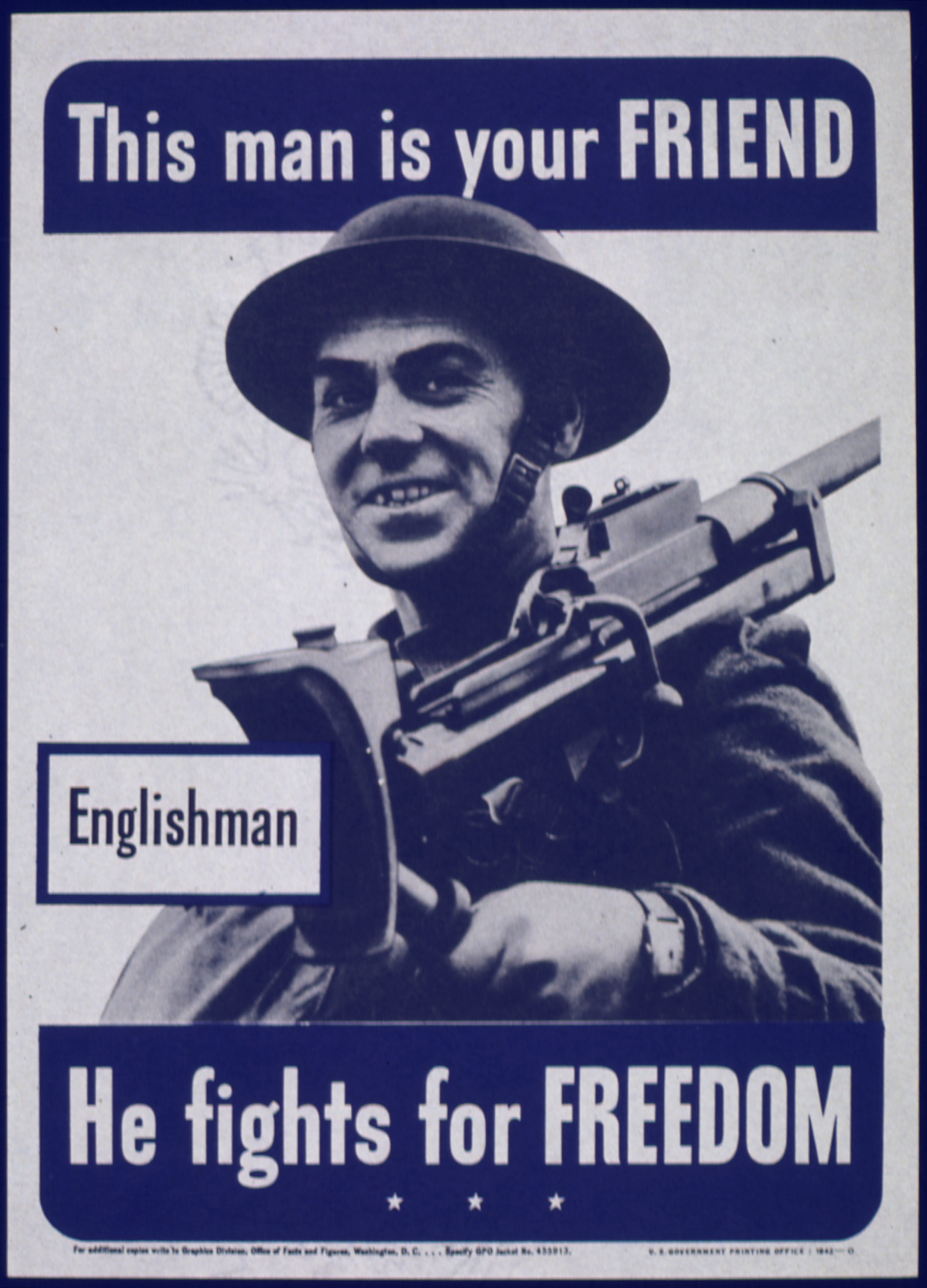
American World War II propaganda poster featuring a British soldier carrying a Boys anti-tank rifle.

The Boys anti-tank rifle (officially Rifle, Anti-Tank, .55in, Boys, and sometimes incorrectly spelled "Boyes") is a British anti-tank rifle used during the Second World War. It was often nicknamed the "elephant gun" by its users due to its size and large 0.55 in (14 mm) bore.

There were three main versions of the Boys: an early model (Mark I), which had a circular muzzle brake and T-shaped monopod, built primarily at BSA in England; a later model (Mk I*) built primarily at the John Inglis and Company in Toronto, Canada, that had a rectangular muzzle brake and a V-shaped bipod; and a third model made for airborne forces with a 30-inch (762 mm) barrel and no muzzle brake. There were also different cartridges, with a later version offering better penetration.

Although adequate against light tanks and tankettes in the early part of the war, the Boys was ineffective against heavier armour and was phased out in favour of the PIAT hollow charge weapon mid-war.

== Design and development ==
Henry C. Boys, (1885–1937), oversaw development of the firearm bearing his surname, as a Captain, assistant superintendent of design, member of the British Small Arms Committee, and a designer at the Royal Small Arms Factory, Enfield. The weapon was initially called "Stanchion", but renamed to "Boys", when he died a few days before his rifle was approved for service, in November 1937.

A bolt action rifle fed from a five-shot magazine, the weapon was large and heavy with a bipod at the front and a separate grip below the padded butt. In order to combat the recoil caused by the large 0.55 inches (14 mm) round, a muzzle brake was fitted on the barrel while the receiver was allowed to slide along the frame with a shock absorber attached to the rear of the rifle. The Boys had been designed with numerous small narrow-slotted screws of soft steel set very tight into the body of the weapon and its repair and maintenance proved difficult.

The .55 Boys cartridge was an adaptation of the .50 BMG with a belt added firing a 47.6 g (735 gr) bullet. At its introduction, the weapon was effective on light armour 23.2 mm (0.91 in) thick at 100 yards (91 m).

Two main service loads were used during the Second World War: The W Mark 1 a 60 g (930 gr) AP projectile fired at 747 m/s (2,450 ft/s), and the W Mark 2 ammunition, 47.6 g (735 gr) AP at 884 m/s (2,900 ft/s). The W Mark 1 could penetrate 0.91 in (23.2 mm) of armour at 100 yards (91 m), about the thickness used on the frontal armour of a half-track or armoured car, or the side or rear armour of a light tank. Later in the conflict, a more effective round was developed, the W Mark 2, which fired a tungsten-cored projectile at 945 m/s (3,100 ft/s). The Boys' effective range against unarmoured targets (for example, infantry), was much greater.

Despite its recoil slide and rubber-cushioned buttpad, the recoil of the weapon (along with noise and muzzle blast) was said to be painful, frequently causing neck strains and bruised shoulders. Consequently, the Boys was almost never fired as a free weapon (that is, not affixed to a support) except in emergencies.

== Operational use ==
The Boys rifle was used in the early stages of the Second World War against lightly armoured German tanks and combat vehicles. Britain also supplied a large number of Boys anti-tank rifles to Finland in 1939 and 1940 during the Winter War with the Soviet Union. The weapon was popular with the Finns, because it could deal with Soviet T-26 tanks, which the Finnish Army encountered in many engagements.

Although useful against early German and Italian tanks in France and North Africa, as well as in the Norwegian campaign, such as the Panzer I, Panzer II and early models of Panzer III, improvements in vehicle armour during the Second World War left the Boys largely ineffectual as an anti-tank weapon. A shortened version was deployed in 1942, for issue to airborne forces, and saw use in Tunisia (where it proved completely ineffective, because of the reduced velocity caused by the shortened barrel). A further limitation was that the Boys rifle was relatively heavy and unwieldy to carry.

The Boys' reputation after the Battle of France was such that the Canadian government, through the Directorate of Military Training, the Department of National Defence and National Film Board of Canada (NFB) commissioned a training film, Stop That Tank! (1942), from Walt Disney Studios, to counter the rifle's "jinx" reputation. (Note: In the National Film Board of Canada production, Letter from Camp Borden (1941), a Canadian sergeant is shown trying to explain the "virtues" of the Boys Mk.1 to a group of doubting recruits.)

Nonetheless, in the European theatre, it was soon replaced by the PIAT (Projector, Infantry, Anti-Tank) in 1943, which first saw service during the Allied invasion of Sicily. In other roles, the Boys saw some use against bunkers, machine gun nests and light-skinned vehicles, but was rapidly replaced in British and Commonwealth service, as quantities of the latter weapon became available, by the U.S. .50 BMG calibre M2 Browning machine gun.

Using armour-piercing (AP), armour-piercing incendiary (API), and armour-piercing incendiary tracer (APIT) ammunition, the .50 Browning was just as capable in armour penetration (Note: Quote: "A review of World War II U.S. .50 caliber AP, API, and APIT ammunition specifications reveals that all armour-piercing varieties of the U.S. .50 BMG cartridge were required to completely perforate 7/8 in (22.23 mm) of hardened steel plate armour at 100 yards (91 m).) and more devastating when igniting thin-skinned vehicles using incendiary rounds than the Boys, and could also serve as an effective anti-aircraft weapon. The heavier Browning, however, was not "man-portable" at 38 kg (84 lb) without tripod and 58 kg (128 lb) with tripod. Even the British Special Air Service, which made much use of captured or cast-off weapons for their jeeps and reconnaissance vehicles, quickly got rid of their Boys rifles, in favour of M2 Brownings or the Italian 20mm Breda cannon.

The weapon was standard issue to British and Commonwealth forces, which attempted to stem the Japanese onslaught through the Pacific theatre. At Milne Bay, at least one of the two Type 95 tanks was perforated by several shots from a Boys. During the Battle of Jitra a Boys gunner of the 1/14th Punjabi Regiment knocked out two light Japanese tanks, blocking the bridge that was the route of Japanese advance. During the Battle of Singapore, the 1st Bn Cambridgeshire Regiment claims the Boys was very useful in knocking holes through walls during street fighting. After the war in the Pacific, the gun was used by the Royal Malay Regiment to fight against communist insurgents, during the Malayan Emergency.

The U.S. Marine Corps purchased Canadian Boys rifles prior to the attack on Pearl Harbor. They saw limited use by the Marine Raider battalions against enemy bunkers, and aided in the destruction of two seaplanes off Makin Island. The U.S. Army's 1st Ranger Battalion was also equipped with Boys, but they were not used in combat. The other five Ranger battalions were authorized Boys, but were not equipped with them.

The Boys rifles used by the Kingdom of Greece during the Greco-Italian War and Greek Civil War. 1,786 Boys 14 mm British anti-tank rifles were ordered from Greece for the direct anti-tank protection of the infantry. However, from the beginning and during the war, only 122 of them reached Greece.

The Boys rifles were also used by the Chinese Nationalist Army during the late Second Sino-Japanese War, in both China and Burma.

The Boys rifle was also equipped and used by the Philippine guerrilla and resistance forces as well as the United States Army Forces in the Philippines – Northern Luzon (USAFIP-NL) during the Second World War against the Japanese occupation and to aid the Allied liberation. In the post-Second World War era, it was operated by the Armed Forces of the Philippines including Philippine Army and Philippine Constabulary during the Hukbalahap Rebellion against the Hukbalahap Communist fighters in Central Luzon and by the Philippine Expeditionary Forces to Korea (PEFTOK) against the North Korean and Chinese communist forces.

In September 1965, members of the IRA hit the British fast-attack patrol boat HMS Brave Borderer with a Boys rifle, crippling one of her turbines while she was paying a visit to Waterford, Ireland.

== Performance ==
The contemporary training manuals for the Boys directed that it was for protecting the platoon against light armoured fighting vehicles: penetrating "their armour up to about 500 yards range" and "inflict casualties on their crew, although it may not seriously damage the vehicle itself."

A manual on the Boys published for the Home Guard in 1944 gave the expected performance against armour ranging from 0.91 in (22.3 mm) at 100 yards square on to 0.35 in (8.8 mm) at 500 yards hitting at a 40-degree angle. The manual also noted that maximum penetration against other materials was 14 in (360 mm) of brick walls and 10 in (250 mm) of sandbags.

== Users ==
- Australia
- British India
- Canada: 771 Boys Rifles produced in Canada, sold to the United States.
- China
- Finland – as 14 mm pst kiv/37, during the Winter War and the Continuation War.
- France – received a large shipment in exchange for 25 mm anti-tank guns.
- Ireland
- Provisional IRA used it during The Troubles
- Israel
- Kingdom of Italy – captured in the North African campaign.
- Kingdom of Greece – 1,786 British 14 mm Boys anti-tank rifles were ordered from Greece for the immediate protection of the infantry. used in the Greco-Italian War and Greek Civil War.
- Malaya
- Nazi Germany – rifles captured after the evacuation of the British Expeditionary Forces in Norway and France were designated 13,9 mm Panzerabwehrbüchse 782 (englisch), abbreviated PzB 782(e), in German service.
- New Zealand
- Philippines
- Poland: Polish Armed Forces in the West
- Portugal
- Soviet Union – received 3,200 Boys rifles via Lend-Lease.
- South Africa
- United Kingdom
- United States – used by Marine Raiders. Authorized for US Army Rangers in 1943, but not used. During the Korean War, the Marine Corps borrowed some Boys rifles from Canadian troops, strengthened the action and mounted them with scopes. They were used as long-range sniper rifles on an experimental basis, firing double charged .50 BMG ammunition. These rifles had a range of over 2,000 yards.
- Yugoslav Partisans

=== Vehicle mounting ===
The Boys rifle was sometimes mounted on vehicles such as the Universal Carrier ("Bren Gun Carrier"), Humber Light Reconnaissance Car and the Morris CS9, Standard Beaverette and Rolls-Royce armoured cars.

== See also ==
- Mauser 1918 T-Gewehr
- PTRD-41
- PTRS-41
- Wz. 35 anti-tank rifle
