= 17 mm caliber =

Firearm cartridge classification

- Firearm cartridges
- « 15 mm, 16 mm 17 mm 18 mm, 19 mm »

This is a list of firearm cartridges which have bullets that are 17 millimetres (0.67 in) to 17.99 millimetres (0.708 in) in caliber.

- Length refers to the cartridge case length.
- OAL refers to the overall length of the cartridge.
- Bullet refers to the diameter of the bullet.

All measurements are in mm (in).

== Cartridges ==
Dimensions	Name	Date	Bullet diameter	Case length	Rim	Base	Shoulder	Neck	Cartridge length
17×17mm	FN 303 no letal								
17×30mmR	Dutch Snider 1868 coiled case								
17×38mmR	.70 Dreyse CF								
17×56mm	Short Express								
17.2×64mmR	.64 Maynard Shot 1873								
17.5×28mmR	Snider Danés								
17.8×30mmR	Snider Danés 1867 type 3								
17.8×30mmR	Snider Danés 1867 type 3								
17.8×89mmR	.700 Nitro Express	1988	17.78 (.700)	88.90 (3.50)	22.606 (.890)	19.812 (.780)	N/A	18.491 (.728)	106.68 (4.20)
	.70-150 Winchester		17.9 (.705)	55.37 (2.18)	22.1 (.870)	20.44 (.805)	20.07 (.790)	18.42 (.725)	66.8 (2.63)
