= 13 mm caliber =

Firearm cartridge classification

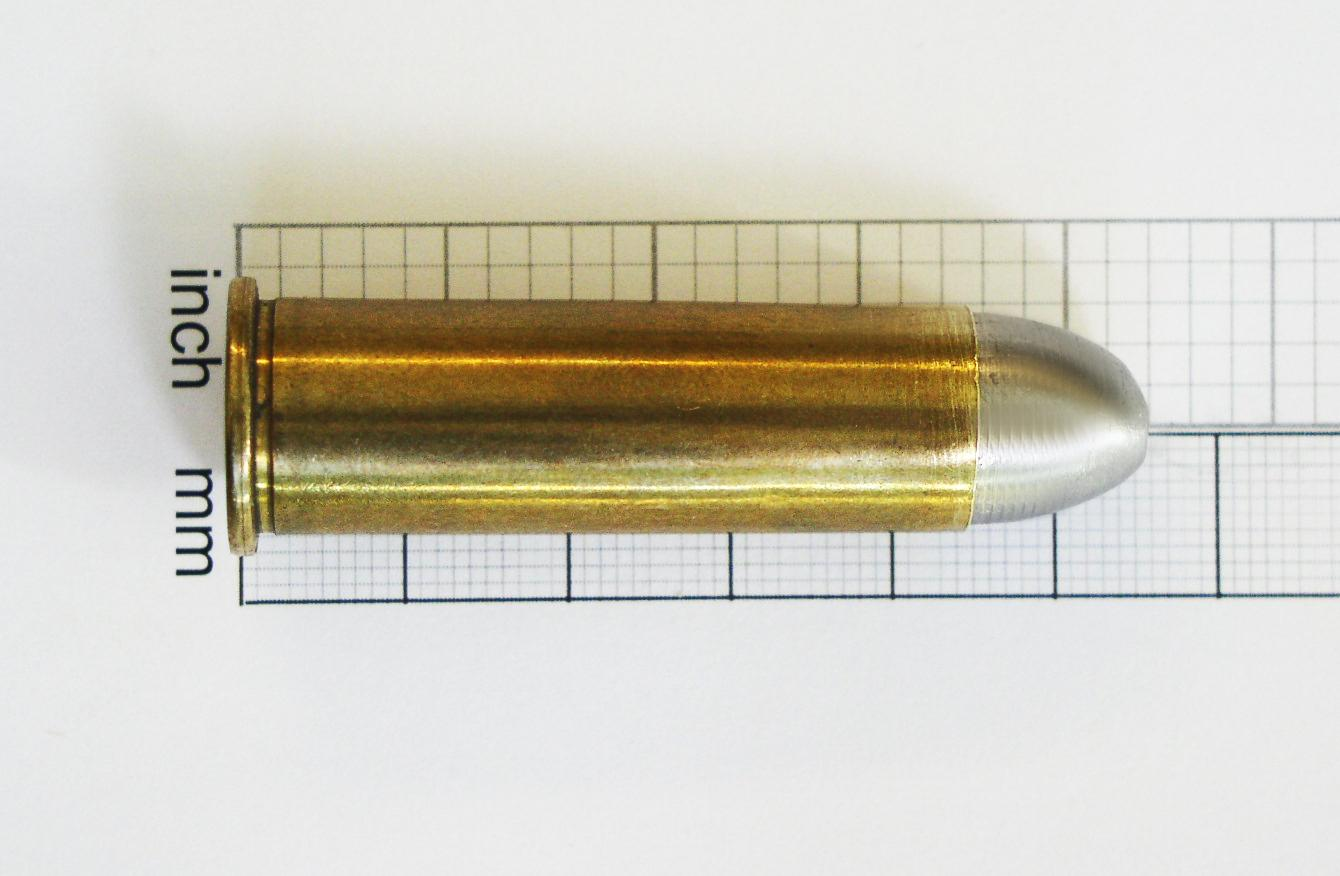
- Example of a 13 mm cartridge, a .50-70 Government
- Firearm cartridges
- « 11 mm, 12 mm 13 mm 14 mm, 15 mm »

This is a list of firearm cartridges which have bullets that are 13 millimetres (0.51 in) to 13.99 millimetres (0.551 in) in caliber.

- Length refers to the cartridge case length.
- OAL refers to the overall length of the cartridge.
- Bullet refers to the diameter of the bullet.

All measurements are in mm (in).

== 13 mm cartridges ==
Note that dimensions do not always reflect the actual dimensions.

| Dimensions | Name | Date | Bullet diameter | Case length | Rim | Base | Shoulder | Neck | Cartridge length |
|---|---|---|---|---|---|---|---|---|---|
| 12.7×45mmR | .50-70 Government | | 13.08 mm (0.515 in) | 44.45 mm (1.750 in) | 16.76 mm (0.660 in) | 14.35 mm (0.565 in) | N/A | 13.69 mm (0.539 in) | 57.15 mm (2.250 in) |
| | 13mm Gyrojet | 1960s | 13 mm (0.51 in) | - | - | - | - | - | 50 mm (2.0 in) |
| 13×32mmR | | | | | | | - | | |
| 13×35mmR | .500 Linebaugh | | 13 mm (0.51 in) | 35.7 mm (1.41 in) | 15.5 mm (0.61 in) | 14.0 mm (0.55 in) | - | 13.7 mm (0.54 in) | 44.6 mm (1.76 in) |
| 13×61mmR | .50-110 Winchester | | 13.0 mm (0.51 in) | 61 mm (2.4 in) | 15.4 mm (0.61 in) | 14.0 mm (0.55 in) | - | 13.6 mm (0.54 in) | 70 mm (2.8 in) |
| 13×63mmR | | | | | | | - | | |
| 13×64mm | | | 12.91 mm (0.508 in) | 64 mm (2.5 in) | 17.2 mm (0.68 in) | 17.1 mm (0.67 in) | 16.26 mm (0.640 in) | 13.78 mm (0.543 in) | 104.8 mm (4.13 in) |
| 13×64mmR | .50-90 Sharps | | 13.0 mm (0.51 in) | 63.5 mm (2.50 in) | 16.84 mm (0.663 in) | 14.86 mm (0.585 in) | 13.41 mm (0.528 in) | 13.41 mm (0.528 in) | 81.28 mm (3.200 in) |
| 13×76mmR | .500 Nitro Express | | 13.0 mm (0.51 in) | 76 mm (3.0 in) | 16.8 mm (0.66 in) | 14.7 mm (0.58 in) | - | 13.6 mm (0.54 in) | 93 mm (3.7 in) |
| 13×83mmR | .50-140 Sharps | | 13.0 mm (0.51 in) | 83 mm (3.3 in) | 16.6 mm (0.65 in) | 14.0 mm (0.55 in) | - | 13.4 mm (0.53 in) | 100 mm (3.9 in) |
| 13×87mmR | | | | | | | - | | |
| 13×94mm | | | | | | | - | | |

== 13.2 mm cartridges ==
| Dimensions | Name | Date | Bullet diameter | Case length | Rim | Base | Shoulder | Neck | Cartridge length |
|---|---|---|---|---|---|---|---|---|---|
| 13.2×26mmR | .56-.52 Spencer CF | | | | | | - | | |
| 13.2×39mmR | .52-70 Sharps CF | | | | | | - | | |
| 13.2×92mmSR | 13.2mm TuF | | 13.2 (525) | 91.32 | 23.1 | 20.9 | 19.1 | 14.6 | 132.6 (5.25) |
| 13.2×93mm | Shortened Hotchkiss case (German) | | | | | | - | | |
| 13.2x96mm | 13.2 mm Hotchkiss Short | 1935 | 13.2 (525) | 96 | 20.2 | 20.12 | 18.6 | 14.4 | 136.5 (5.25) |
| 13.2x97mm | 13.2 mm Hotchkiss experimental | | | | | | - | | |
| 13.2x99mm | 13.2 mm Hotchkiss Long | 1929 | 13.2 (525) | 99.54 | 20.2 | 20.12 | 18.6 | 14.4 | 136.5 (5.25) |
| 13.2/9.2x99mm | Hotchkiss Gerlich XPL | | | | | | - | | |

== 13.3–13.9 mm cartridges ==
| Dimensions | Name | Date | Bullet diameter | Case length | Rim | Base | Shoulder | Neck | Cartridge length |
|---|---|---|---|---|---|---|---|---|---|
| 13.5×97mmB | XPL STA Narrow belt | | | | | | - | | |
| 13.6×77mmR | .600-538 Mega Magnum | | | | | | - | | |
| 13,9×39mmR | .54 Morse Type I | | | | | | - | | |
| 13.9×67mm | .550 Express Belted | | | | | | - | | |
| 13.9×78.8mm | .550 Magnum | | | | | | - | | |
| 13.8×79.7mm | .550 Wells | | | | | | - | | |
| 13.9×99mmB | .55 Boys | 1937 | 14.30 (.563) | 97.79 (3.85) | 20.244 (.797) | 20.168 (.794) | 15.34 mm (.604 in) | 15.392 (.606) | 133.43 mm (5.253 in) |
| 14 mm | .54 Burnside | | | | | | - | | |
| 14 mm | .54 Burnside Rodman-Crispin | | | | | | - | | |
