= Montana 500 =

Montana 500 is the informal name given to an annual endurance run for Ford Model T automobiles in Montana. The run is sponsored by the Montana Cross Country T Association. The first endurance run was held in September 1961. It began in Missoula, Montana and ran to the North Dakota border. In 2010, Nan Robison became the first woman to win the Montana 500. She drove her yellow 1925 cut-off touring car named "Tweety Bird"

== Event details ==
The Montana 500 is a timed event, held on the public roads of Montana. The host town changes each year. The 2011 event was held in Conrad and was called the "Bud Peters Memorial Run" in honor of Bud Peters of Ledger, Montana, a village near Conrad. The run is open to any Model T Ford that meets the criteria of the Association. The first two days of the run are approximately 200 miles each with timed pit stops and the last day is approximately 100 miles for a total of around 500 miles.

The 2021 event will be held from June 20–23, based out of Kalispell, Montana.
