= .50-140 Sharps =

Rifle cartridge

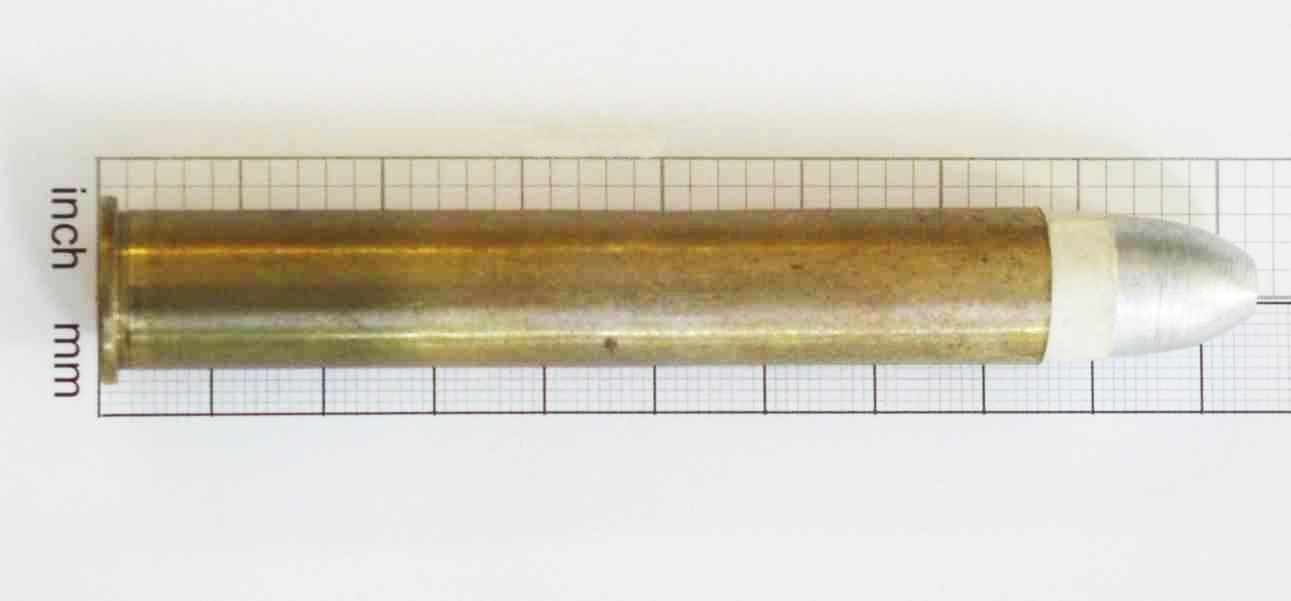
- .50-140 Sharps cartridge
- Type: Rifle
- Place of origin: United States

Service history
- Used by: United States

Production history
- Designed: 1884
- Produced: 1884–present

Specifications
- Parent case: .50 Basic
- Case type: Rimmed, straight
- Bullet diameter: .512 in (13.0 mm)
- Neck diameter: .529 in (13.4 mm)
- Shoulder diameter: .529 in (13.4 mm)
- Base diameter: .551 in (14.0 mm)
- Rim diameter: .652 in (16.6 mm)
- Case length: 3.25 in (83 mm)
- Overall length: 3.95 in (100 mm)
- Primer type: Large rifle

Ballistic performance
Bullet mass/type	Velocity	Energy
638 gr (41 g) FN	1,413 ft/s (431 m/s)	2,829 ft⋅lbf (3,836 J)
- Test barrel length: 30"; Source(s): The Complete Blackpowder Handbook

The .50-140 Sharps (13×83mmR), also known as the .50-3 1/4" Sharps, is a black-powder rifle cartridge that was introduced in 1884, as a big game hunting round. It is believed to have been introduced for the Sharps-Borchardt Model 1878 rifle. The cartridge is very similar to the .500 Black Powder Express.

This round was introduced by Winchester 3 years after the Sharps Rifle Company closed its doors in 1881. It is similar to, though larger than, the .50-90 Sharps. With the Sharps Rifle Co. officially closing in 1881, and with the .50-140 being introduced 3 years later, the .50-140, will not be classified as Sharp's most powerful rifle cartridge.

== Specifications ==
Bullet diameter is typically .512 in (13.0 mm), with weights of 600 to 700 grains (39 to 45 g).

The powder charge is typically 140 grains (9.1 g) of black powder. Modern substitutes such as Pyrodex are sometimes used, although using smaller charges since pyrodex is less dense than black powder. In a strong action with modern smokeless powder, it can exceed a 500-grain (32 g) .458 Winchester Magnum velocity while using a heavier 550-grain (36 g) bullet.

== Dimensions ==
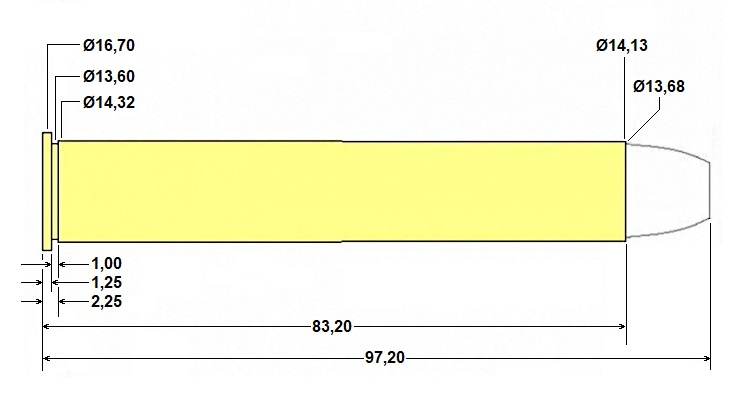

== History ==
The .50-140 was created for big game hunting, and was the most powerful of the Sharps Bison cartridges. However, it was introduced about the time of the end of the great Bison herds. An obsolete round, ammunition is not produced by any major manufacturer although reloading components and brass can be acquired or home-built.

Rifles are infrequently produced by a few companies. They are typically used for bison hunting and reenactments. Occasionally, the .50-140 is used in vintage competitions, although some shooters claim it produces heavier recoil than other old-time cartridges such as the .45-70.

== See also ==
- List of rimmed cartridges
- List of rifle cartridges
- 13 mm caliber (greater than .51 inches)
