= 15 mm caliber =

Firearm cartridges

- Firearm cartridges
- « 13 mm, 14 mm 15 mm 16 mm, 17 mm »

This is a list of firearm cartridges which have bullets that are 15 millimetres (0.59 in) to 15.99 millimetres (0.630 in) in caliber.

- Length refers to the cartridge case length.
- OAL refers to the overall length of the cartridge.
- Bullet refers to the diameter of the bullet.

All measurements are in mm (in).

== Cartridges ==
Dimensions	Name	Date	Bullet diameter	Case length	Rim	Base	Shoulder	Neck	Cartridge length
15×96mm	Mauser		15.1	96	-	-	-	-	-
15×104mm	Brno		15 (.59)	103.9 (4.094)	24.9	24.9	23.1	17.14	152
15.24×40mmR	Krnka		15.45 (.608)	40 (1.575)	-	-	-	-	-
15.5×106mm	BRG		15.49 (.61)	106 (4.173)	-	-	-	-	-
15.7×76mmR	.600 Nitro Express	1899	15.7 (.620)	76 (3)	20.4 (.805)	17.7 (.697)	N/A	16.5 (.648)	93 (3.68)
	.600 Overkill		15.7 (.62)	76 (3)	16.3 (.64)	16.7 (.656)	16.4 (.646)	16.4 (.646)	93 (3.65)
