= 500 Brickell =

Residential building in Miami, Florida, U.S.

Coordinates: 25.76845°N 80.19019°W

500 Brickell West Tower
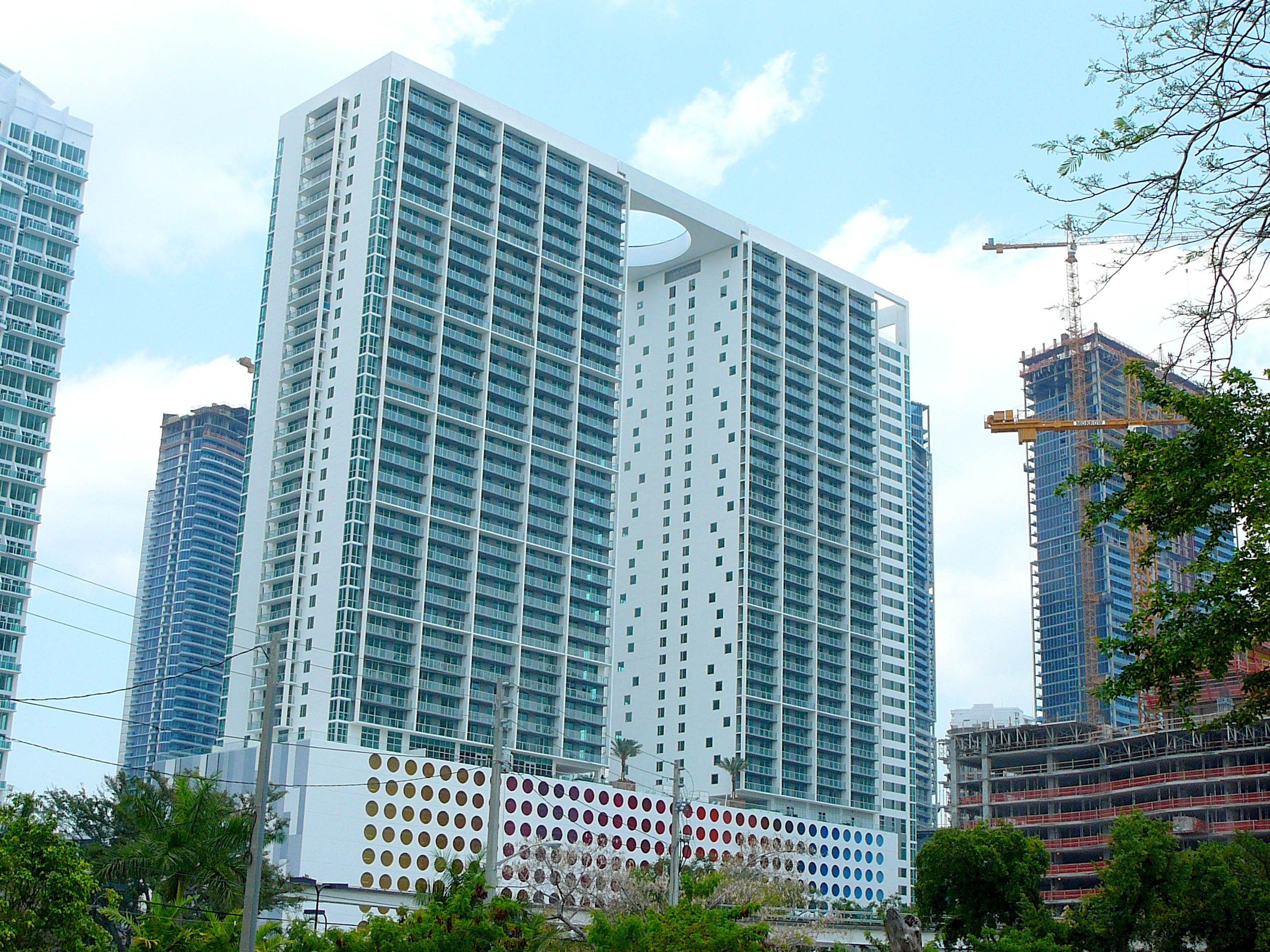
- 500 Brickell Towers in May 2008
- Interactive map of the 500 Brickell West Tower area

General information
- Type: Residential
- Location: 500 Brickell Avenue, Miami, Florida, United States
- Construction started: 2005
- Completed: 2008
- Opening: 2008

Height
- Roof: 426 ft (130 m)

Technical details
- Floor count: 42

Design and construction
- Architect: Arquitectonica
- Developer: Related Group of Florida

500 Brickell is a residential complex in the Brickell neighborhood of Miami, Florida, United States. The complex consists of two condominium towers, 500 Brickell West Tower and 500 Brickell East Tower. The two buildings were designed as twin towers, and rise 426 feet (130 meters), with 42 floors. Both skyscrapers were designed by the Arquitectonica architectural firm and the complex was developed by Thomas Kramer's Portofino Group in partnership with the Related Group of Florida. The towers' construction began in April 2005, was topped out in mid-2007 and was completed in 2008.

- MyBrickell: From 2012 to 2014 a smaller building named myBrickell was built directly to the west of 500 Brickell, on the same lot. It has no parking built in, but is connected to the pedestal of 500 Brickell via skybridge. It was the first high-rise building built in Miami after the Great Recession, and sold out in 2014.

== Design ==
500 Brickell was originally designed to emulate a giant arch. Both towers are connected by a 10-story base, and the top floors of the two towers are also connected by a large white roof. The roof was designed with a circular hole to direct light into the courtyard formed between the two buildings, where a large pool is located.

== See also ==
- List of tallest buildings in Miami
