= 500s =

500s may refer to:

- The popular North American card game known as 500s, also the National Card game of Australia.
- The period from 500 to 599, almost synonymous with the 6th century (501–600).
- The period from 500 to 509, known as the 500s decade, almost synonymous with the 51st decade (501–510).
