= Fiat 500 (disambiguation) =

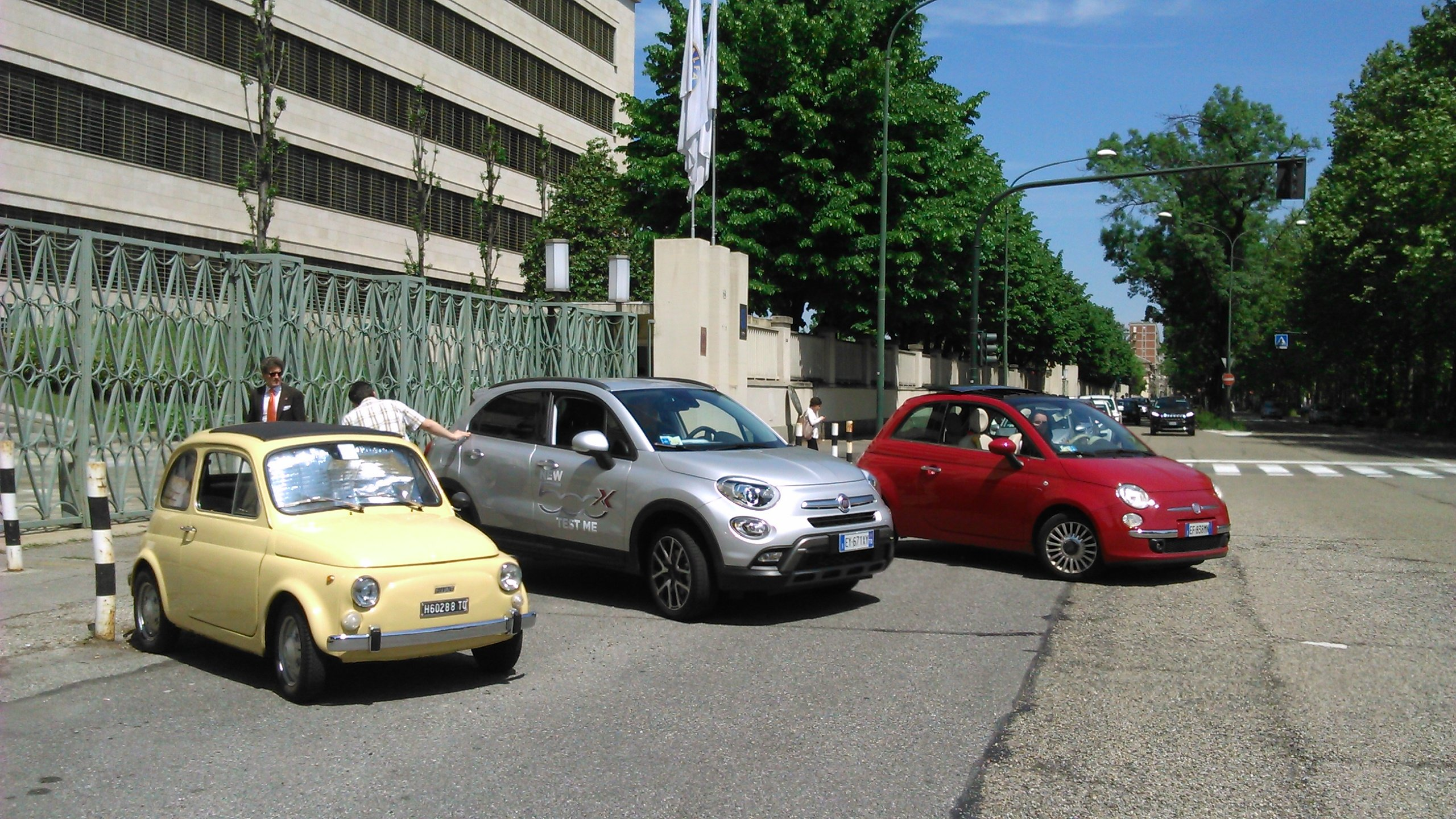
The 1957-1975 Fiat 500, the 500X and the 2007-2019 model

Fiat 500 mainly refers to the 3 meter short FIAT model produced from 1957 to 1975. Its model number, initially referring to approx. 500 cc engine capacity, is also used for earlier or later cars manufactured by Fiat. All are known as the Fiat Cinquecento in their home market regardless of whether they are numerically badged or not.

- Fiat 500 "Topolino" – produced 1936–1955, Front-engine, rear-wheel-drive
- Fiat 500, produced 1957–1975, 2-cylinder air-cooled Rear-engine, rear-wheel drive
- Fiat Cinquecento – produced 1991–1998, succeeded by the Seicento
- Fiat 500 (2007) – produced 2007–2024, inspired by the 1957–1975 model
- Fiat 500e (2013) – produced 2013–2019, an electric version of the 2007 model for California
- Fiat 500e – presented in 2020, introduced as an electric model, successor of the 2007–2019 model
- Fiat 500L – mini MPV produced from 2012 to 2022, succeeding the Multipla
- Fiat 500X – 2013 model announced in 2012 as the crossover version of the 500L
