= WTS .50 =

WTS .50 BMG
- Type: bolt-action pistol
- Place of origin: Germany

Production history
- Manufacturer: WTS Waffentechnik in Suhl GmbH

Specifications
- Mass: 15.87 lb (7.2kg) empty
- Length: 24.21 inches (615 mm)
- Barrel length: 16.92 inches (420mm)
- Cartridge: .50 BMG
- Action: Bolt-action
- Sights: Standard picatinny rail

WTS .50 BMG is a bolt action, .50 caliber pistol manufactured by WTS Waffentechnik in Suhl GmbH, a German firearm manufacturer. The gun is equipped with a grip safety and a muzzle brake featuring two chambers. The trigger is multi-stage and adjustable.
