= Eton Park Capital Management =

Hedge fund run 2004 to 2017

Eton Park Capital Management LLC
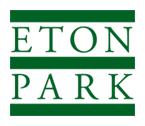
- Company type: Private
- Industry: Investment Management
- Founded: New York, NY, USA (2004)
- Defunct: 2017
- Headquarters: 399 Park Avenue; New York City
- Key people: Eric Mindich, Founder and CEO
- Total assets: $9 billion (2015)

Eton Park Capital Management was an investment firm. The firm aimed to provide risk-adjusted returns for investors over multi-year periods. The firm invested in a range of markets and products, including public equity, fixed income and derivatives markets. Eric Mindich was the firm's Chief Executive Officer. Eton Park had offices in New York City, London, and Hong Kong. From 2012 to 2014, Eton Park's annualized return averaged over 13% while the S&P500 averaged nearly 18%.

== History ==
Eton Park was founded in 2004 by Eric Mindich, who previously had been a partner at Goldman Sachs. While at Goldman, Mindich was a senior member of its Principal Strategies group. Eton Park's launch was one of the largest in history at $3.5 billion.

On March 23, 2017, Mindich announced the fund would shut down after incurring a 10% loss in 2016.
