= Ultimate 500 =

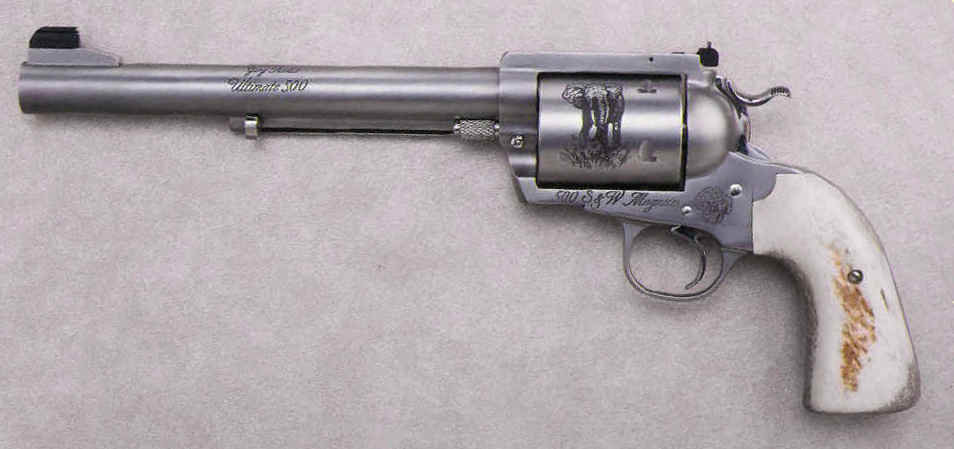
- Type: Revolver
- Place of origin: United States

Production history
- Designer: Gary Reeder
- Manufacturer: Gary Reeder Custom Guns

Specifications
- Mass: 50 oz (1.417 kg)
- Length: 14.5 in (36.83 cm)
- Barrel length: 8.5 in (21.59cm)
- Cartridge: .500 S&W Magnum
- Action: Single action
- Feed system: 5-shot cylinder

Ultimate 500 is a 5-shot single-action revolver chambered for the .500 S&W cartridge, manufactured by Gary Reeder Custom Guns.

The revolver has an 8.5-inch barrel.
