= Mercedes-Benz 500 =

Mercedes-Benz has sold a number of automobiles with the "500" model name, and the nomenclature usually refers the 5.0L V8 engine under the hood.

Most of the "500" badged cars featuring this type of engine are the various incarnations of the Mercedes-Benz S-Class flagship sedan, making it synonymous with the "500" vernacular. However, the engine and model number can also be found on other nameplates such as the E-Class midsize sedan, CL-Class coupé, and SL-Class roadster.

== Examples ==
- Mercedes-Benz W08 - Nürburg 500, 500
- Mercedes-Benz R107 - 500SL
- Mercedes-Benz R129 - 500SL, SL500
- Mercedes-Benz W124 - 500E, E500
- Mercedes-Benz W126 - 500SEC, 500SEL
- Mercedes-Benz W140 - 500SEL, 500 SEC, S500
- Mercedes-Benz W220 - S500
- Mercedes-Benz W221 - S500 (S550 in North America)
