= Springfield Model 1886 =

- Type: Breech-loading carbine
- Place of origin: United States

Service history
- Used by: United States

Production history
- Designed: 1886
- Manufacturer: Springfield Armory
- Produced: 1886
- No. built: c. 1,000

Specifications
- Length: 40 in (1,000 mm)
- Barrel length: 24 in (610 mm)
- Cartridge: .45-55-405
- Action: Trapdoor
- Rate of fire: User dependent; usually 8 to 10 rounds per minute
- Muzzle velocity: 1,100 feet per second (340 m/s)
- Feed system: Breech-loading
- Sights: Open sights

The Springfield Model 1886 was a trapdoor breechblock service rifle produced by the Springfield Armory for the United States military. It followed the Springfield Model 1882 “short rifle” as an attempt to create a single longarm that would satisfy the needs of the infantry, cavalry, and artillery.

Approximately 1,000 carbines were produced and were sent to the field for trials. Like the Model 1882, the Model 1886 performed adequately in field trials, but was not seen as an improvement over existing arms.

== History and design ==
The Model 1886 carbine was 40 inches long, with a 24 inch barrel. It featured the new sight created by Lieutenant Colonel Adelbert R. Buffington that had been incorporated into the Springfield Model 1884 rifle. The stock had a storage compartment for a three piece folding cleaning rod and a ruptured case extractor. The upper barrel band also had a curved swivel sling design that allowed it to fit close to the stock when the carbine was placed in a saddle boot. The Model 1886 did not have the lower barrel band that had been present on the Model 1882. The carbine was fitted with a 24-inch (61 cm) barrel and a full walnut stock.

== See also ==
- Springfield rifle
