= Springfield Model 1888 =

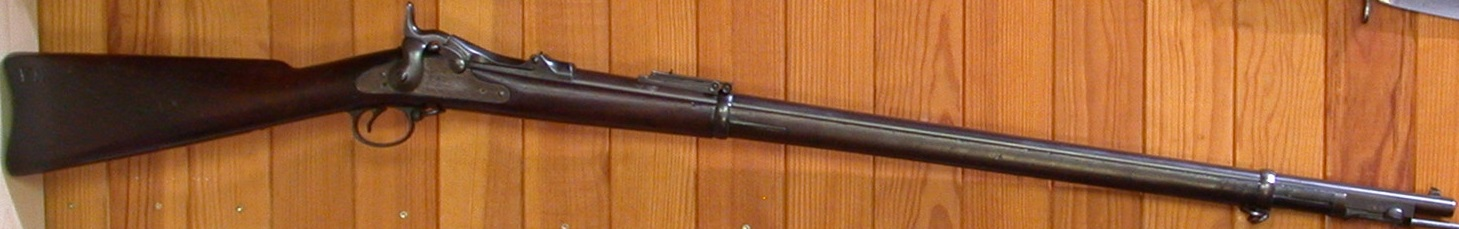
- Type: Breech-loading rifle
- Place of origin: United States

Service history
- In service: 1888–1918
- Used by: United States
- Wars: American Indian Wars; Spanish–American War; Philippine–American War; World War I

Production history
- Designed: 1888
- Manufacturer: Springfield Armory
- Produced: 1888–1892
- No. built: Approx. 60,000

Specifications
- Length: 52 in (1,300 mm)
- Barrel length: 32.5 in (830 mm)
- Cartridge: .45-70-405
- Action: Trapdoor
- Rate of fire: User dependent; usually 8 to 10 rounds per minute
- Muzzle velocity: 1,350 feet per second (410 m/s)
- Feed system: Breech-loading
- Sights: Open sights

The Springfield Model 1888 was a trapdoor breechblock service rifle produced by the Springfield Armory for the United States military. Introduced in 1888, it was the final design in a long line of such weapons using a design developed by Erskine S. Allin in the 1860s, and the last single-shot rifle to see American military service.

Despite the replacement of the trapdoor rifles by the adoption of newer repeating rifles, they were manufactured until 1893 and saw combat during the Spanish–American War, a combat that was dominated by the newer Springfield Krag–Jørgensen bolt action rifle. The Model 1888, despite its aged technology, was built in large numbers and was also the most advanced and efficient of all the Springfield trapdoor rifles, and for this reason remains popular among military enthusiasts.

== History and design ==
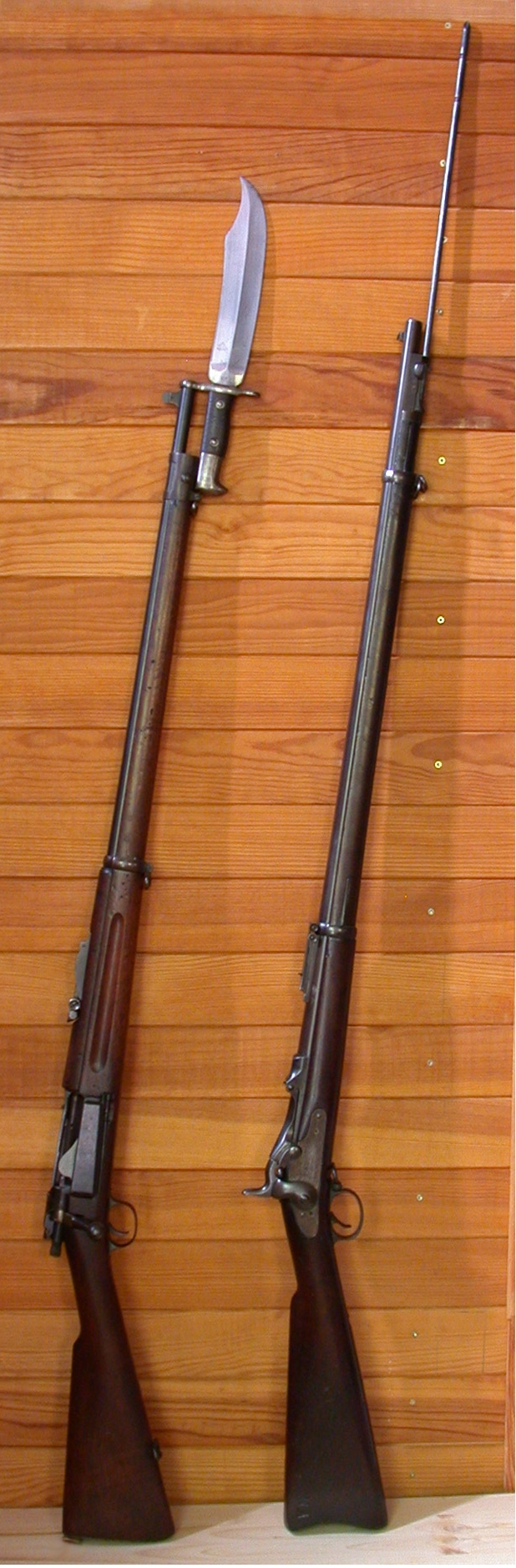
Springfield M1898 Krag–Jørgensen, with attach Bowie-style bayonet (left), and its predecessor, the Springfield Model 1888

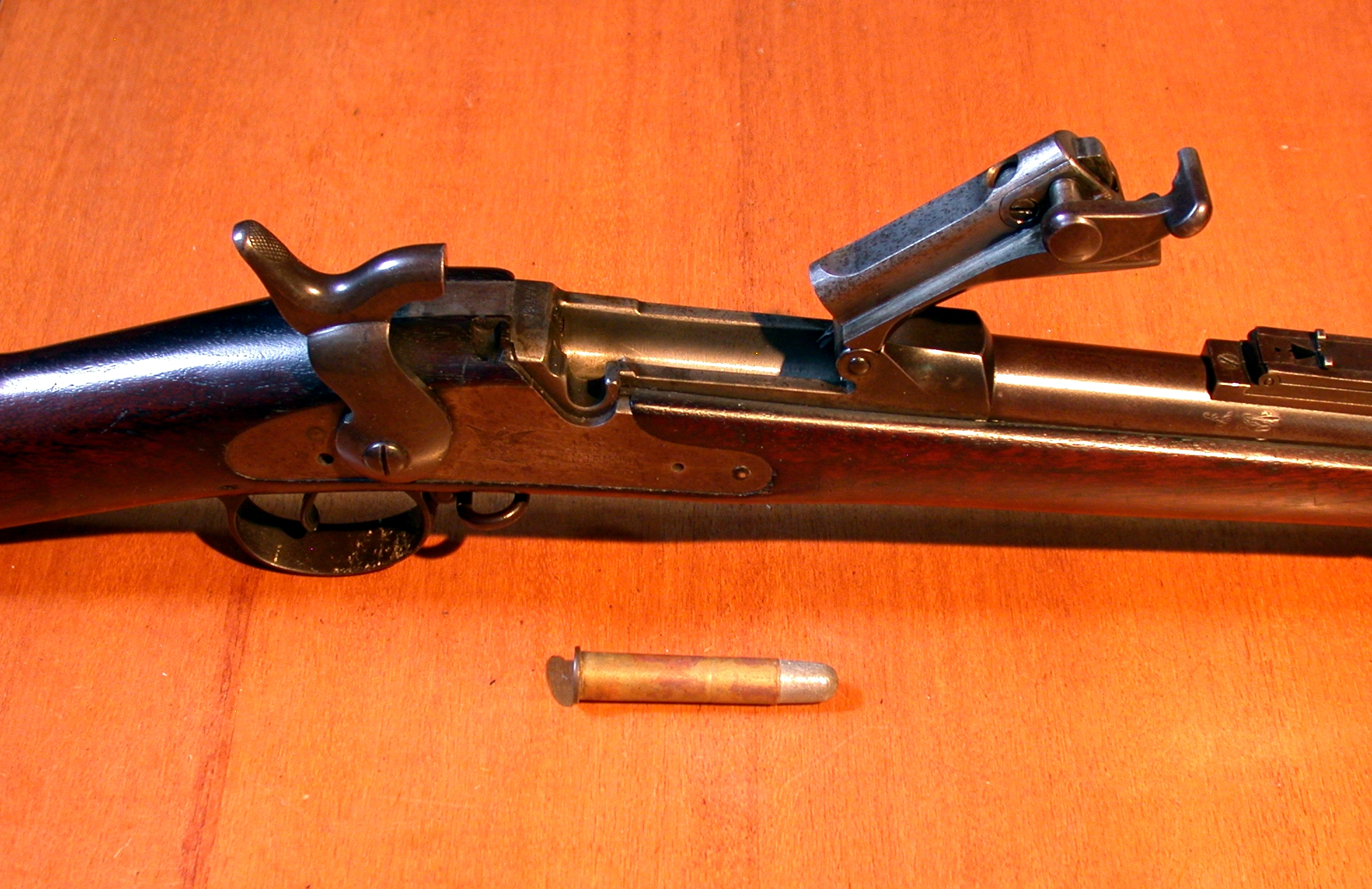
Open Springfield Model 1888 breech and .45-70 cartridge

The trapdoor Springfields had originally been produced with reworked bayonets left over from the Civil War. When supplies of these bayonets ran low, Springfield Armory attempted to create a new design, as these bayonets were considered to be obsolete.

For the Springfield Model 1880, Springfield Armory had attempted to combine the bayonet and cleaning rod into a single unit. This model had not been successful, due to problems with the bayonet/cleaning rod retaining mechanism and poor ballistic performance of the weapon due to the heavy forward mounting mechanism.

The Model 1888 was Springfield's last attempt at producing a combined cleaning rod and bayonet design. The Model 1888 was based on the Springfield Model 1873 line of rifles, which had undergone several refinements which had been incorporated into the Springfield Model 1884. Unlike the earlier Model 1880, the Model 1888 used a round rod bayonet design.

The Model 1888 proved to be much more successful than the Model 1880. Between 1890 and 1893, over 60,000 Model 1888 rifles were produced.

During the Spanish–American War, regular army troops were generally issued the new Krag rifles, while guard units were often issued older trapdoor Springfields, typically Model 1884 or Model 1888 rifles. Ultimately, the Springfield Model 1888 would be completely replaced by the newer and more efficient Krag design until 1903, when the Krag itself was replaced with the more efficient M1903 Springfield. Although the Model 1888 Springfield proved to be the most developed and efficient of the Springfield trapdoor rifles, it was simply no match for the advanced technology then available and in use around the world. However, despite its obsolescence, the Springfield trapdoor would continue to see use for training and stateside security purposes as late as World War I.

== See also ==
- Springfield rifle

| Preceded by Springfield Model 1884 | United States military rifle 1888–1892 | Succeeded by Springfield Model 1892 |
