= Springfield Model 1877 =

- Type: Breech-loading carbine
- Place of origin: United States

Service history
- Used by: United States

Production history
- Designer: Erskine S. Allin
- Designed: 1877
- Manufacturer: Springfield Armory

Specifications
- Barrel length: 22 in (560 mm)
- Cartridge: .45-70-405
- Action: Trapdoor
- Rate of fire: User dependent; usually 8 to 10 rounds per minute
- Muzzle velocity: 1,350 feet per second (410 m/s)
- Feed system: Breech-loading
- Sights: Open sights

The Springfield Model 1877 was a variant of the Springfield Model 1873 carbine.

In 1877, many changes were made to both the Model 1873 rifle and the Model 1873 carbine (the carbine was just a shorter version of the rifle). Historically, the Model 1877 rifle has just been considered to be a variant of the Model 1873, while the Model 1877 carbine has been considered to be a separate model.

The most visible change was made to the stock. The buttstock comb was extended further forward on the wrist to strengthen the wrist's weak spot. The wrist itself was also thickened.

Prior to 1877, the trapdoor breechblock had a high arch machined out of it, making it lighter. The Model 1877 no longer had the arch machined out of it, though the reason for this modification is not clear. Gas ports along the upper ridges of the receiver were also extended, which may explain why the arch on the breechblock was removed at the same time.

After the Battle of Little Bighorn, Springfield Armory was assigned the task of providing a cleaning rod for the carbine version that could also be used to remove stuck cartridge. A three piece steel rod was designed that fit into the butt. This required a new butt plate specifically for the carbine, as the longer rifle already included a cleaning rod and did not need these modifications.

The rear sight was also modified. The rifle version of the new sight was stamped with an R, and the carbine version was stamped with a C. The different sights were necessary because the carbine used a 55-grain (3.6 g) cartridge instead of the rifle's 70-grain (4.5 g) cartridge.

== See also ==
- Springfield rifle
