= Springfield model 1880 =

Springfield Model 1880
- Type: Breech-loading rifle
- Place of origin: United States

Service history
- Used by: United States

Production history
- Designed: 1880
- Manufacturer: Springfield Armory
- Produced: 1880
- No. built: 1,000

Specifications
- Length: 52 in (1,300 mm)
- Barrel length: 32.5 in (830 mm)
- Cartridge: .45-70-405
- Action: Trapdoor
- Rate of fire: User dependent; usually 8 to 10 rounds per minute
- Muzzle velocity: 1,350 feet per second (410 m/s)
- Feed system: Breech-loading
- Sights: Open sights

The Springfield Model 1880 was a trapdoor rifle based on the design of the Springfield Model 1873.

== History and design ==
In the years following the U.S. Civil War, Springfield Armory had produced bayonets by re-working older bayonets left over from the war. By 1880, their supply of bayonets had been almost completely exhausted. Rather than re-tool their production equipment to make an item that was now considered obsolete, Springfield Armory chose instead to modify the Model 1873 to use a new bayonet system.

In the days of smoothbore muskets, bayonets had played a considerable role on the battlefield, often accounting for as many as a third or more of all battlefield casualties. The more accurate rifled muskets of the Civil War and the switch to breech-loading weapons in the years after the Civil War made older bayonet tactics obsolete. Many military leaders believed that soldiers would benefit more from a bayonet that functioned more as a trench digging instrument than a traditional combat style bayonet. Many of these new trowel type bayonets were fielded. However, in the late 1870s the U.S. Army high command remained unconvinced of the usefulness of this style of bayonet, and informed commanders in the field that they could exchange their trowel bayonets for more classical triangular bayonets.

For the Model 1880, Springfield Armory departed from previous bayonet designs and attempted to produce a combination bayonet and cleaning rod. The bayonet was of the triangular style, as the trowel type had recently fallen out of favor. Approximately 1,000 of the Model 1880 rifles were produced and were fielded for testing.

The Model 1880 did not do well in testing. The rod's retaining mechanism was problematic and did not work well until a key was added to the locking spring. The design modifications altered the ballistics of the weapon, and the sights had to be modified to compensate for the changes. Because of these problems, the Model 1880 rifles were all returned from the field and were placed into storage. After a failed successor design, the Springfield Model 1882, further attempts at improvement succeeded with the Springfield Model 1884, and Springfield Model 1888 rifles.

== See also ==
- Springfield rifle
