= Springfield Model 1875 =

- Type: Breech-loading rifle
- Place of origin: United States

Service history
- Used by: United States

Production history
- Designer: Erskine S. Allin
- Designed: 1875
- Manufacturer: Springfield Armory

Specifications
- Barrel length: 26 in (660 mm)
- Cartridge: .45-70-405
- Action: Trapdoor
- Rate of fire: User dependent; usually 8 to 10 rounds per minute
- Muzzle velocity: 1,350 feet per second (410 m/s)
- Feed system: Breech-loading
- Sights: Open sights

The Springfield Model 1875 was a variant of the Springfield Model 1873 rifle.

== History and design ==
The Model 1875 officer's rifle was checkered fore and aft of the trapdoor breech and tipped with white metal. It was fitted with a "globe and pinhead" foresight and a "buckhorn" backsight on the barrel.

It also featured a well-made peep sight fitted on the small of the stock, which was graduated for ranges from 50 to 1,100 yards (46–1,006 m). The rifle had a trigger which could be set to use as a hair trigger. A wooden cleaning rod was fitted under the barrel, and was referred to as a "ramrod" in the rifle's documentation.

The rifle originally sold for $36.

== See also ==
- Springfield rifle
