= Model 1873 =

Model 1873 may refer to:

- The Springfield Model 1873, a trapdoor breechblock service rifle produced by the Springfield Armory.
- The Winchester Rifle Model 1873, a lever action repeating rifle manufactured by the Winchester Repeating Arms Company.
- The Colt Single Action Army, a single-action revolver handgun.
