= 4570 =

4570 may refer to:

- .45-70, a rifle cartridge
- 4570 Runcorn, an asteroid
- a year in the 5th millennium, which is a period of time
