= M1899 =

M1899 may refer to:

- M1899 carbine variant of the Springfield Model 1892–99
- M1899 carbine variant of the Krag–Jørgensen
- FN Browning M1899 variant of the FN M1900
- M1899 variant of the Mauser C96
