= Springfield Model 1882 =

- Type: Breech-loading rifle
- Place of origin: United States

Service history
- Used by: United States

Production history
- Designed: 1882
- Manufacturer: Springfield Armory
- No. built: 52
- Variants: Standard bayonet, triangular ramrod bayonet

Specifications
- Length: 44 in (1,100 mm)
- Barrel length: 28 in (710 mm)
- Cartridge: .45-70-405
- Action: Trapdoor
- Rate of fire: User dependent; usually 8 to 10 rounds per minute
- Muzzle velocity: 1,350 feet per second (410 m/s)
- Feed system: Breech-loading
- Sights: Open sights

The Springfield Model 1882 was a trapdoor short rifle based on the design of the Springfield Model 1873. It is usually referred to as a short rifle but is sometimes called a carbine.

== History and Design ==
The Model 1882 was an experiment by Springfield Armory. Its main goal was to combine the carbine and rifle into a single shoulder weapon which they called the "short rifle" (a concept which the U.S. Army would not accept until the adoption of the Springfield Model 1903). It was hoped that this one single shoulder arm could then supply the needs of the infantry, cavalry, and artillery.

The short rifle was produced with a 28-inch (71 cm) barrel. Two versions were made, one with a full stock and a cleaning rod like the standard rifle, and another with a triangular cleaning rod bayonet similar to the one that had been used on the Springfield Model 1880. Only 26 of each type were manufactured.

The Model 1882 was sent out for field trials in the spring of 1882. There it performed well but failed to impress military commanders, and was not seen as an improvement on existing arms. Development of a single shoulder arm for infantry, cavalry, and artillery would continue in the Springfield Model 1886.

== See also ==
- Springfield rifle
