= Springfield rifle =

Term for several American rifles

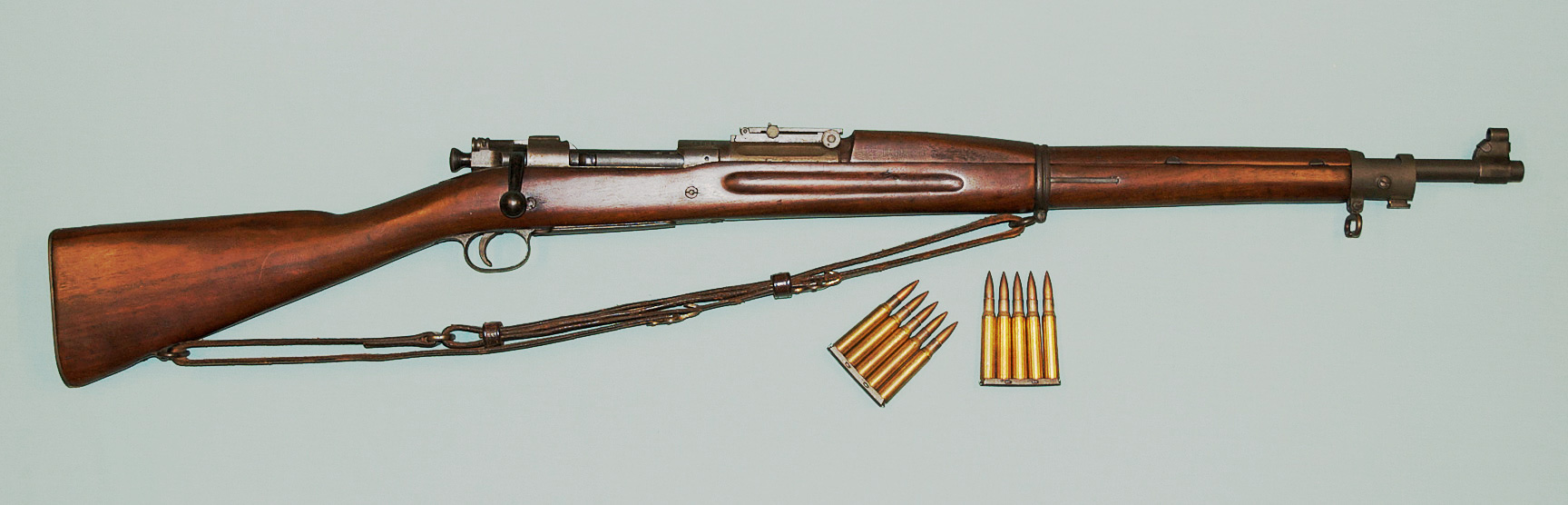
Springfield Model 1903 rifle

The term Springfield rifle may refer to any one of several types of small arms produced by the Springfield Armory in Springfield, Massachusetts, for the United States armed forces.

In modern usage, the term "Springfield rifle" most commonly refers to the Springfield Model 1903 for its use in both World Wars.

There were also numerous limited production, experimental, marksmanship, and sporting rifles produced by the Springfield Armory which are referred to as "Springfield rifles".

Some examples of the smoothbore Springfield Model 1842 musket that were later modified with rifling and used during the American Civil War may also be referred to as "Springfield rifles". Other experimental models are bolt-action replacements for Allin system like the Springfield Model 1871 Ward-Burton chamber in .50 Cal 32.5, and the Springfield Armory Model 1882/1884 Bolt Action Magazine Rifle, .45-70 Chaffee-Reese.

Rifled musket:

- Springfield Model 1855 – .58 caliber Maynard tape primer/percussion lock rifled musket.
- Springfield Model 1861 – .58 caliber percussion lock rifled musket.
- Springfield Model 1863 – .58 caliber percussion lock rifled musket.

Single-shot breechloading rifle:

- Springfield Model 1865 – .58-60 caliber trapdoor rifle.
- Springfield Model 1866 – .50-70 caliber trapdoor rifle.
- Springfield Model 1868 – .50-70 caliber trapdoor rifle.
- Springfield Model 1869 – .50-70 caliber trapdoor cadet rifle.
- Springfield Model 1870 – .50-70 caliber trapdoor rifle.
- Springfield Model 1870 Remington-Navy – .50-70 caliber rolling-block rifle.
- Springfield Model 1871 – .50-70 caliber rolling-block rifle.
- Springfield Model 1873 – .45-70 caliber trapdoor rifle.
- Springfield Model 1875 – .45-70 caliber trapdoor officer's rifle.
- Springfield Model 1877 – .45-70 caliber trapdoor carbine.
- Springfield Model 1880 – .45-70 caliber trapdoor rifle.
- Springfield Model 1882 – .45-70 caliber trapdoor short rifle.
- Springfield Model 1884 – .45-70 caliber trapdoor rifle.
- Springfield Model 1886 – .45-70 caliber trapdoor carbine.
- Springfield Model 1888 – .45-70 caliber trapdoor rifle.

Repeating rifle:

- Springfield Model 1892–99 – .30-40 caliber Krag–Jørgensen bolt action rifle.
- Springfield Model 1903 – .30-03, .30-06 caliber bolt action rifle.
- Springfield Model 1922 – .22 LR caliber bolt action cadet rifle.

Self-loading rifle:

- M1 Garand – .30-06 caliber semi-automatic rifle.
- Johnson M1941 Rifle - .30-06 caliber rotary locking semi-automatic rifle.
- M14 rifle – .308 caliber select-fire rifle.

== See also ==
- Springfield musket
