= Springfield model 1884 =

Springfield Model 1884
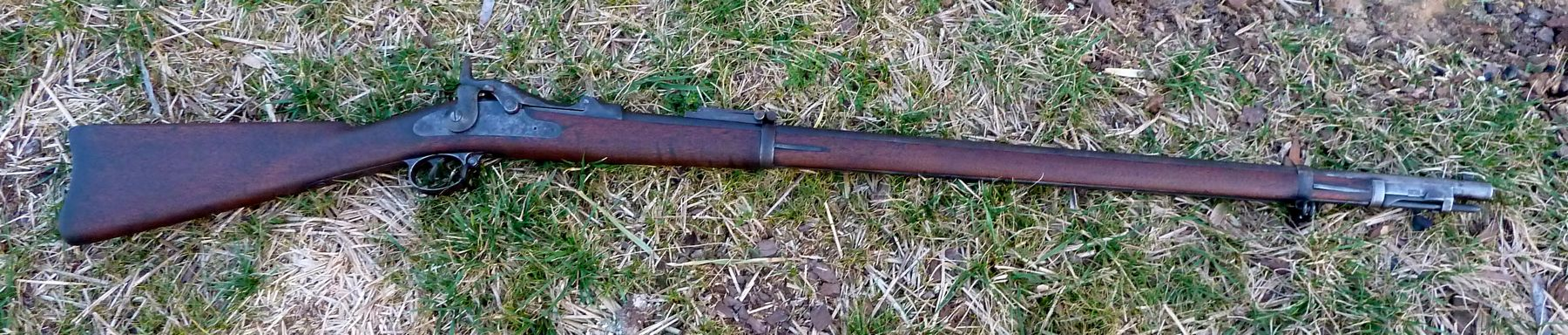
- Type: Breech-loading rifle
- Place of origin: United States

Service history
- In service: 1884–1918
- Used by: United States
- Wars: American Indian Wars; Spanish–American War; Philippine–American War; World War I

Production history
- Designed: 1884
- Manufacturer: Springfield Armory

Specifications
- Length: 51.875 in (1,317.6 mm)
- Barrel length: 32.625 in (828.7 mm)
- Cartridge: .45-70-500
- Action: Trapdoor
- Rate of fire: User dependent; usually 8 to 10 rounds per minute
- Muzzle velocity: 1,315 feet per second (401 m/s)
- Feed system: Breech-loading
- Sights: Open sights

The Springfield Model 1884 was one of the rifles which used the trapdoor breechblock design developed by Erskine S. Allin. It was an improved replacement for the previous longarm of the U.S. Armed Forces, the Springfield Model 1873.

== Description ==
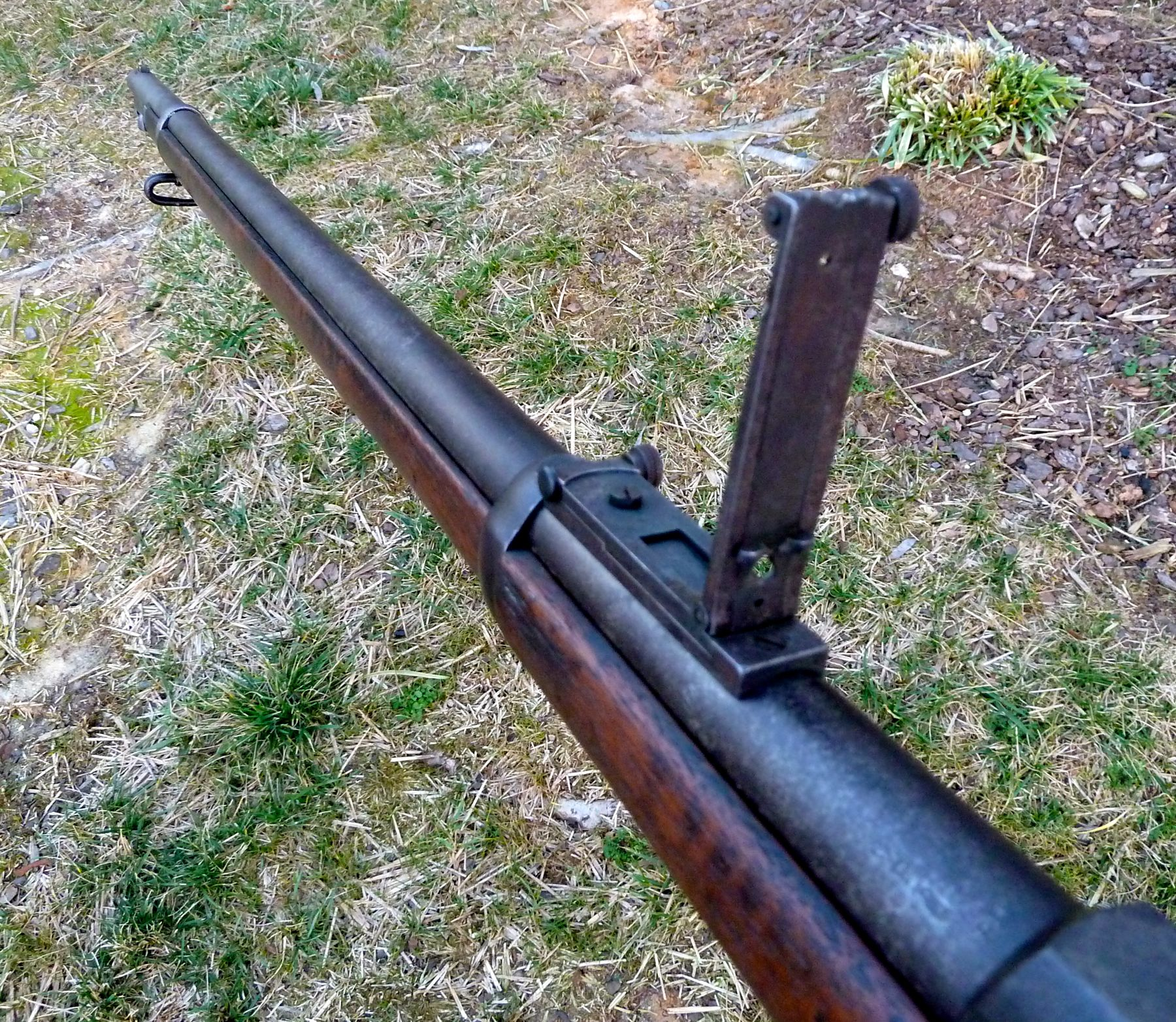
The Buffington rear sight raised on a Springfield Model 1884

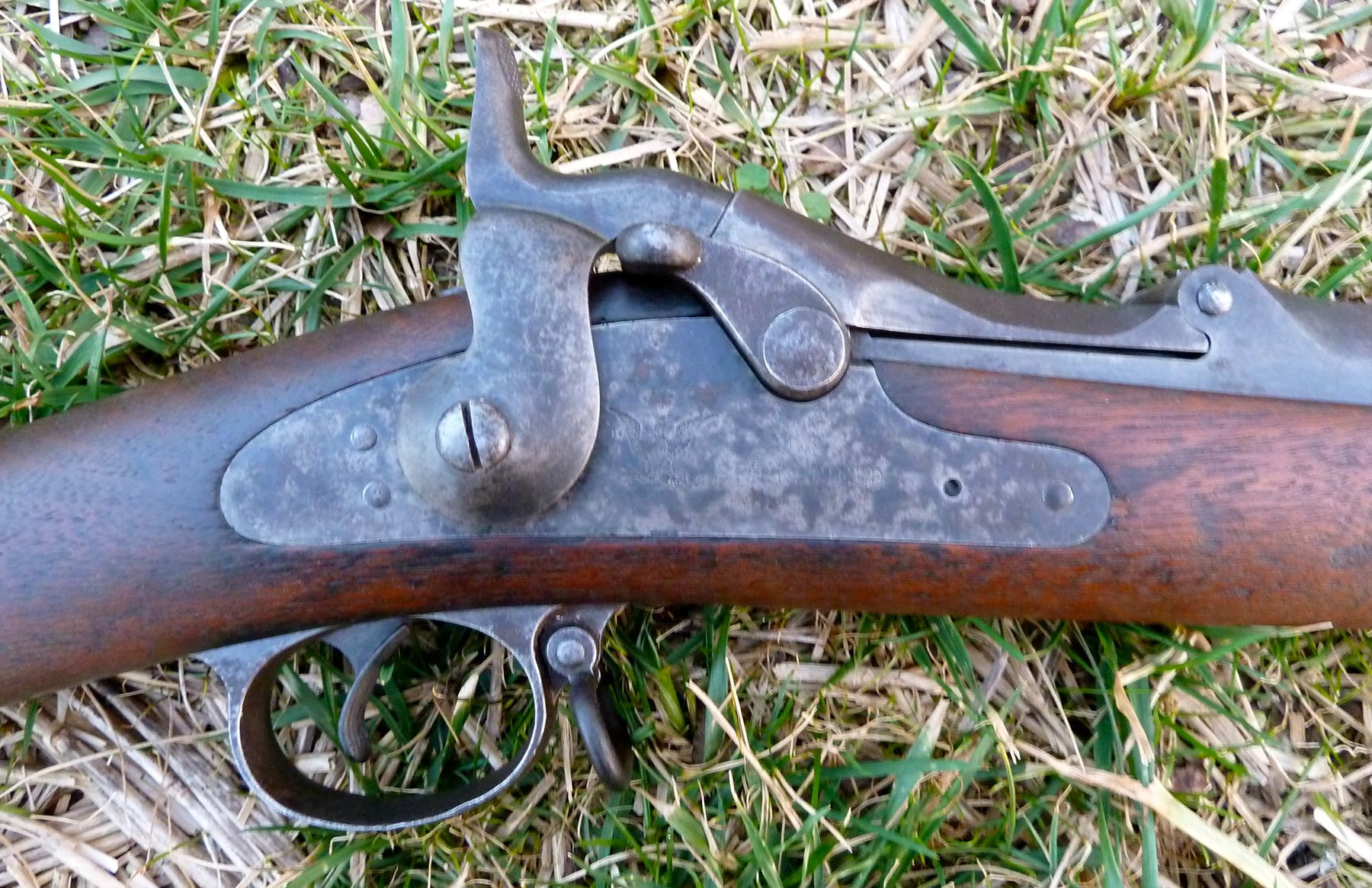
Springfield Model 1884 lock work

The Model 1884 traces its roots back to the design of the Model 1873. The Model 1884 incorporated a significant number of improvements that had been made between 1878 and 1879. It also featured a serrated trigger that had been incorporated in 1883.

The most dramatic change to the rifle design, which is often considered to be the identifying feature of the Model 1884, was a new rear sight which had been designed by Lieutenant Colonel Adelbert R. Buffington of the U.S. Army Ordnance Department. This sight however was not perfected until 1885.

The principal feature of this new sight was a rack and pinion style windage adjustment. Unlike previous sights, the base was not used for any position other than point blank. The raised leaf had graduations from 200 to 1,400 yards (180–1,280 m). A new barrel band was also designed to accommodate this new sight so that it could lie flat in the point blank position.

Marksmen generally favored the new sight, but general troops were less enthusiastic about it and often considered it to be an annoyance.

The Model 1884 was also produced in a carbine version. It was found that the rear sight could be easily damaged when removing the weapon from the carbine boot. The rear barrel band was therefore modified in 1890 to include a rear sight protector.

A rod bayonet model was also produced, later designated the Springfield Model 1888. This, like the Springfield Model 1880 and Springfield Model 1882, was an attempt to combine the cleaning rod and bayonet into a single unit. The Model 1888 included an improved retaining mechanism, as the Model 1880 and Model 1882 short rifle's retaining mechanisms had proved to be problematic. Approximately 232,500 Model 1884 rifles were manufactured between 1885–1890.

The black powder Model 1884 continued to be a main service rifle of the U.S. military until it was gradually replaced by the Springfield Model 1892 bolt action rifle, a derivative of the Norwegian Krag–Jørgensen action. Replacement began in 1892, and despite its obsolescence, the Model 1873 was still used by secondary units during the Spanish–American War in Cuba and the Philippines, where it was at a major disadvantage against Spanish forces armed with the 7 mm Spanish Model 1893 Mauser bolt-action rifle. However, despite its obsolescence, the Springfield trapdoor would continue to see use for training and stateside security purposes as late as World War I.

== See also ==
- Springfield rifle

Preceded by Springfield Model 1873	United States military rifle 1884–1888	Succeeded by Springfield Model 1888
