= William Crozier (artillerist) =

United States Army general (1855–1942)

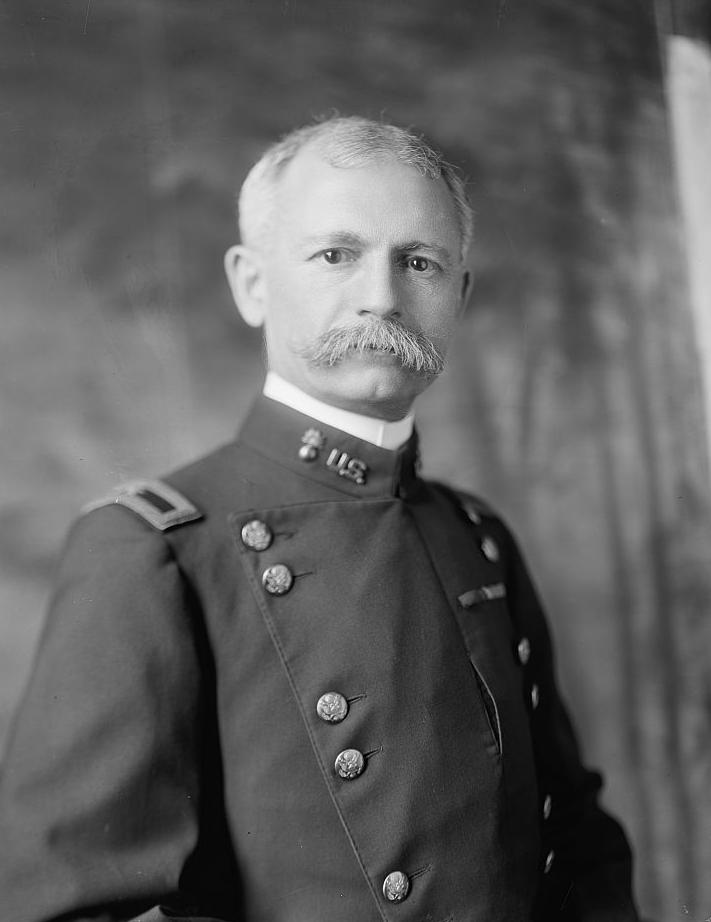
- Crozier, 1905–1942
- Born: February 19, 1855; Carrollton, Ohio, US
- Died: November 10, 1942 (aged 87); Washington, D.C., US
- Burial place: Arlington National Cemetery
- Relatives: Robert Crozier (father)
- Military career
- Allegiance: United States of America
- Branch: United States Army
- Service years: 1876–1918
- Rank: Major General
- Service number: 0-12991
- Commands: 11th Chief of Ordnance (1901-1917); United States Army War College
- Conflicts: Indian Wars; Spanish–American War; Philippine–American War; China Relief Expedition

William Crozier (February 19, 1855 – November 11, 1942) was a career United States Army officer in the Ordnance Corps and the 11th Chief of Ordnance.

== Early life ==
Born at Carrollton, Ohio on February 19, 1855, Crozier was the son of Robert Crozier (1827–1895), Chief Justice of Kansas in 1863–1866, and a United States Senator from December 1873 to February 1874. William Crozier married Miss Mary Hoyt Williams (1864–1955) in England on October 31, 1913; the only daughter of Mrs. Elizabeth Hoyt Williams and the late Charles Augustus Williams (1829–1899) of New London and Washington, and the sister of the Hon. William C. Williams (1862–1947), commissioner of immigration at Ellis Island (1902–1905/1910–1914). General Crozier is buried in Arlington National Cemetery Section East Site S-28 with his wife Mary Hoyt Crozier (née Williams).

Crozier graduated from the United States Military Academy at West Point, New York in 1876, and was appointed a second lieutenant in the 4th Artillery. Hugh L. Scott, Eben Swift, James Parker and George Andrews were among his classmates. He then served on the Western frontier for three years against the Sioux and Bannock Indians.

== Career ==
From 1879 to 1884 Crozier was instructor in mathematics at West Point, and was superintendent of Watertown Arsenal from 1884 to 1887.

In 1888 he was sent by the War Department to study recent developments in artillery in Europe, and on return he was placed in full charge of the construction of gun carriages for the army. With General Adelbert R. Buffington, a future Chief of Ordnance of the United States Army, he invented the Buffington–Crozier disappearing gun carriage (1893). He also invented a wire-wound gun, and perfected many appliances connected with heavy and field ordnance.

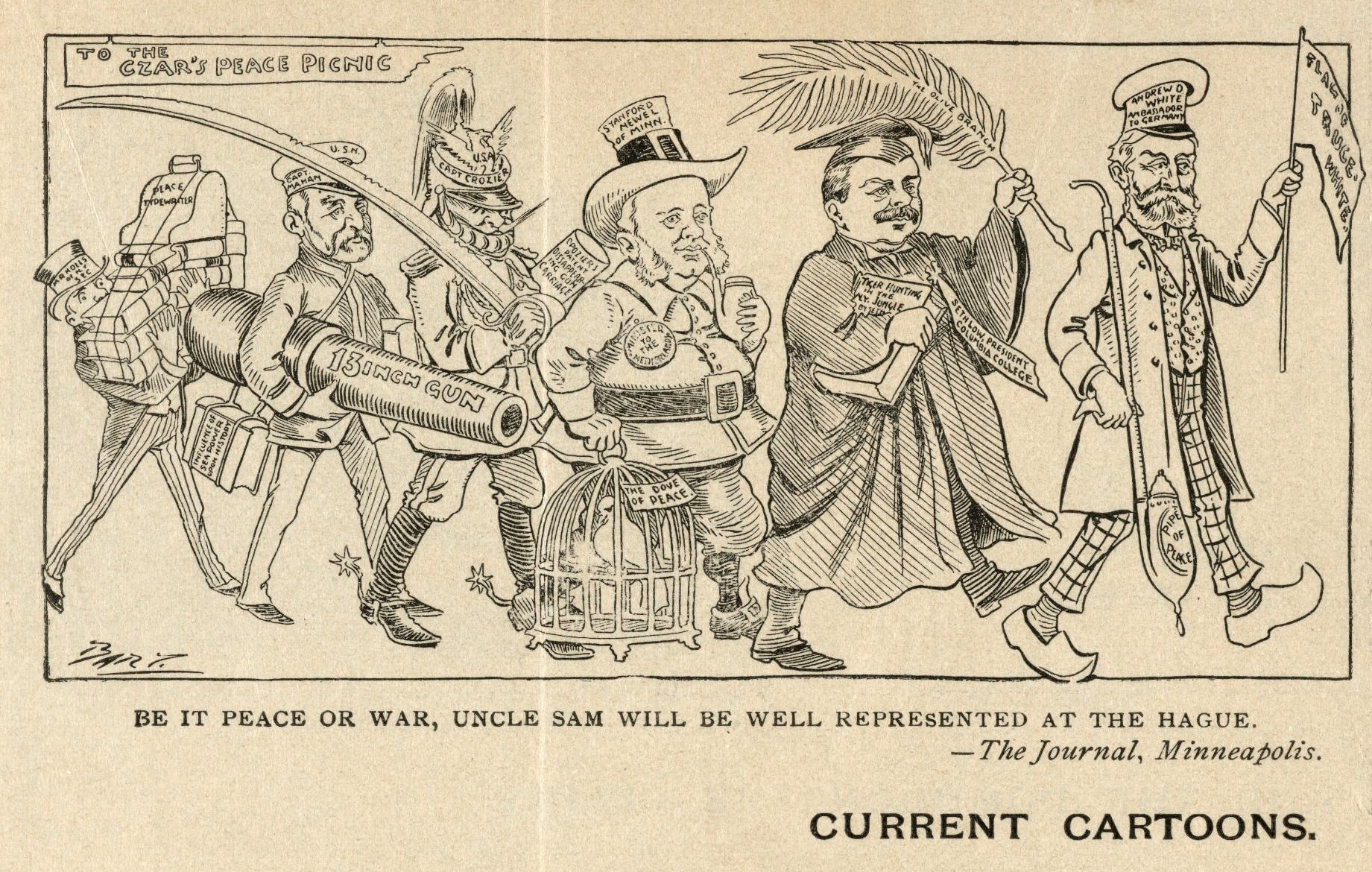
Cartoon of the American delegation to the International Peace Conference, 1899, featuring Captain Crozier, third from left

In 1890 Crozier was promoted to the rank of captain. During the Spanish–American War he was inspector-general for the Atlantic and Gulf coast defenses.

In 1899 he was one of the American delegates to the Peace Conference at the Hague.

He later served in the Philippines on the staffs of Generals John C. Bates and Theodore Schwan, and in 1900 was chief of ordnance on the staff of General Adna Chaffee during the China Relief Expedition.

=== Chief of Ordnance ===
In November 1901 he was promoted to brigadier general, passing over several more senior officers, and succeeded General Buffington as Chief of Ordnance of the United States Army. He served until 1918, not counting the time he was commandant of the Army War College in 1912 and 1913. The provision of munitions in World War I was under his charge until December 1917, eight months after the American entry into World War I. He was then made a member of the Supreme War Council, and in the discharge of this office was in France and Italy for the first half of 1918.

Crozier presided over adoption of the M1911 and the obscure M1909 Benét-Mercié light machine gun, as well as the replacement of .30 Army Gatling Guns. He also oversaw and authorized donation and sale of various condemned cannon for use in town centers, soldier's monuments, and posts for fraternal organizations such as the Grand Army of the Republic. His Notes on the Construction of Ordnance, published by the war department, were used as text-books in the schools for officers, and he also authored several other important publications on military subjects.

Crozier also presided over the adoption of the M1903 rifle, the M1918 BAR (adopted in 1917), and the M1917 machine gun, all of which would serve well into the latter half of the 20th century. He also played a role in the rejection of the Lewis Gun by the Army due to his personal dislike of its inventor, Colonel Isaac Newton Lewis, although it was quickly adopted by the British and used effectively through both World Wars. A few were used by the United States Marine Corps, and eventually, by the Army to a limited degree. In 1907, he was interested in Orville and Wilbur Wright's novel ordnance delivery method.

Crozier was promoted to major general in July 1918 and retired from the Army on 1 January 1919.

=== Gantt chart ===
In 1917, after inspection of factories in which Henry Gantt had installed his methods, Crozier, then Chief of Ordnance, retained Gantt as a consultant on production, first at the Frankford Arsenal, and then, immediately after the April declaration of war, in the Ordnance Department at Washington.

Large orders had been placed with arsenals and other manufacturing plants for the production of arms and munitions, but it was difficult to get a comprehensive idea of what progress was being made in the filling of these orders. Quantities had suddenly jumped from hundreds to millions, and it was impossible to convey by means of typewritten tables the significance of such unusual quantities or the time necessary to produce them. Charts of the usual type were unsatisfactory because they did not sufficiently emphasize the time and because of their bulk, since only one item could be put on a sheet.

Gantt concentrated on developing charts which would show a comparison between performance and promise. Several years previous to this time, he had used a chart on which the work for machines was "laid out" according to the time required to do it. The Gantt Progress Chart, as developed from this early form, was found to help in the making of definite plans and to be highly effective in getting those plans executed. The rate at which the work goes forward is continuously compared with the advance of time, which induces action to accelerate or retard that rate. These charts are not static records of the past: they deal with the present and future and their only connection with the past is with respect to its effect upon the future.

Crozier quickly grasped the possibilities of this chart in helping to fix responsibility for action or lack of action, and had it introduced in various branches of the Ordnance Department. During 1918 these charts were used in the United States arsenals, in the production of naval aircraft, and in other government work, such as that of the Emergency Fleet, the Shipping Board, etc.

== Memorials ==
Crozier died at age 87 in 1942. On his death, he bequeathed to the Philadelphia Museum of Art "The Crozier Collection", of antique crystal, porcelain and china.

On her death the 2 August 1955, Mary Hoyt Crozier (the daughter of New London, Connecticut mayor Charles Augustus Williams) left $300,000 to West Point to build a memorial hall. The USMA rejected her chosen building site, and the bequest reverted to another institution, Connecticut College.

== See also ==
- Lodge Committee, before which William Crozier testified as it was investigating the alleged war crimes of the Philippine–American War.
- List of individual weapons of the U.S. Armed Forces, List of crew-served weapons of the U.S. Armed Forces

== Primary sources ==
- Crozier, William. Ordnance and the World War: A Contribution to the History of American Preparedness (Scribner's, 1920) online
- War Expenditures: Parts 1 to 13, inclusive, except part 9. With index. U.S. Government Printing Office. 1921.

Military offices
Preceded by Adelbert R. Buffington	Chief of Ordnance of the United States Army; 1901−1918	Succeeded by Clarence C. Williams
Preceded by Albert L. Mills	Commandant of the United States Army War College; 1912−1913	Succeeded by Hunter Liggett
