= Adelbert Rinaldo Buffington =

United States Army general

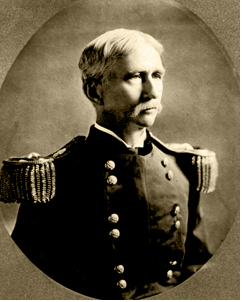
- Born: November 22, 1837; Wheeling, Virginia, US
- Died: July 10, 1922 (aged 84); Madison, New Jersey, US
- Burial place: Arlington National Cemetery
- Military career
- Allegiance: United States; Union
- Branch: United States Army; Union Army
- Service years: 1861–1901
- Rank: Brigadier General
- Commands: 10th Chief of Ordnance (1899–1901)
- Conflicts: American Civil War

Adelbert Rinaldo Buffington (November 22, 1837 – July 10, 1922) was a United States Army Brigadier General who served as the 10th Chief of Ordnance for the U.S. Army Ordnance Corps.

== Biography ==
Adelbert Rinaldo Buffington was born in Wheeling, West Virginia, on 22 November 1837. When he entered the United States Military Academy at West Point in 1856, the standard course was five years in length. Buffington graduated seventh in the Class of May 1861.

He was assigned to Ordnance and immediately placed on duty in Washington, where he trained volunteer soldiers for several weeks. His predecessor as Chief of Ordnance, General Daniel W. Flagler who graduated in the Class of June 1861 performed similar responsibilities when he arrived in Washington several weeks later. In June 1861, Buffington was assigned to the St. Louis Arsenal and by April 1862, was commanding that facility. While organizing the employees of the Arsenal for its defense, Buffington, then a first lieutenant, was commissioned a Colonel of Volunteers, and he briefly aided in the defense of Pilot Knob, Missouri.

On October 25, 1862, he was given command of the ordnance depot at Wheeling, West Virginia, his old home, while he concurrently held the post of Chief Ordnance Officer for the District of West Virginia. Following an assignment as Inspector of Rifling Seacoast Cannon in 1863, he took command of the New York Arsenal in 1864.

For several years following the war, he had charge of breaking up Confederate ordnance establishments in Baton Rouge, Vicksburg, and Galveston, and in 1867, he began a series of assignments at Watertown, Watervliet, and Detroit Arsenals, the latter as commander from 1870 until 1872. During a tour as Assistant Superintendent of Arsenals of Forts on the seacoast from Charleston, South Carolina, to Mobile, Alabama, in the first part of 1872, Buffington came up with the first of his many ordnance inventions, a depressing carriage for a smoothbore seacoast cannon. This design would be the forerunner of a later invention, the disappearing seacoast carriages which he would develop with William Crozier, later to succeed him as Chief of Ordnance. These carriages became standard for coast artillery emplaced in the United States 1890–1925. A succession of further arsenal assignments occupied him during the 1870s, although he also took a leave of absence in the years 1875 and 1876 to inspect arms for the Egyptian Government.

By June 1881, Buffington was a Lieutenant Colonel and he was moved from command of Watervliet Arsenal to Springfield Armory in September of that same year. Here he remained for a decade, during which time he developed a number of inventions, including the steel field carriage for the 3.2-inch field gun (together with its combined limber, caisson, battery wagon, and forge), the Buffington rear sight for small arms, a ramrod bayonet, the nitre process for bluing the minor parts of small arms, and a gas furnace for small forgings. He largely refurbished the shops at Springfield Armory and served on a number of boards, including one on heavy ordnance and projectiles in 1881, another to prepare for the construction of an Army gun factory at Watervliet Arsenal in 1889, and a third concerned with plans to reconstruct the dame at Rock Island Arsenal.

Promoted to Colonel in February 1889, he became the commandant of Rock Island Arsenal in 1892. During his five-year tour at Rock Island Arsnenal, he supervised reconstruction of the bridge connecting the Arsenal island with the mainland at Davenport, Iowa. He also rebuilt the Moline, Illinois, power dam system. In 1897, he was given command of the Powder Depot at Picatinny Arsenal, Dover, New Jersey.

On April 5, 1899, he was promoted to Brigadier General and became the 10th Chief of Ordnance for the United States Army. During his tenure as Chief, he supervised the substitution of nitrocellulose for nitroglycerine powder. This entailed the enlargement of gas chambers for a variety of weapons.

He retired on his 64th birthday, on November 22, 1901, and spent his retirement years at his home in Madison, New Jersey, where he died on July 10, 1922, at the age of 84.

== See also ==
Military offices
Preceded by Brigadier General Daniel W. Flagler	Chief of Ordnance of the United States Army; 1899–1901	Succeeded by Major General William Crozier
