= Springfield Model 1892–99 =

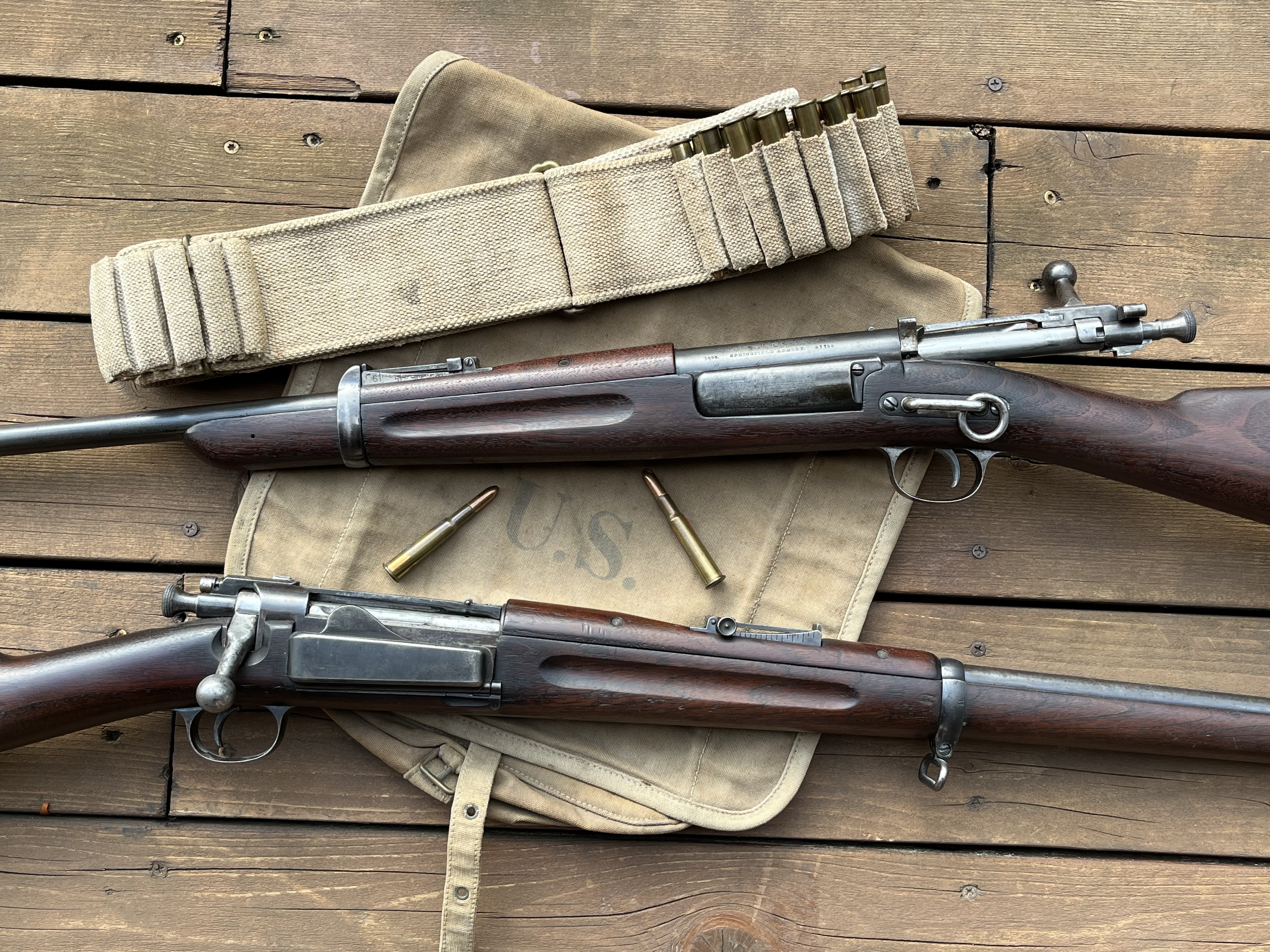
- US M1896 Krag cavalry carbine (top) and infantry rifle (bottom)
- Type: Bolt-action repeating rifle
- Place of origin: United States

Service history
- In service: 1892–1907 (Regular Army)
- Wars: Spanish–American War; Philippine–American War; Boxer Rebellion; Mexican Revolution; World War I (limited)

Production history
- Designer: O H J Krag and E Jørgensen
- Designed: 1886
- No. built: Approx. 500,000
- Variants: M1892 Rifle; M1892 Carbine; M1896 Rifle; M1896 Cadet Rifle; M1896 Carbine; M1898 Rifle; M1898 Carbine; M1899 Carbine; M1899 Constable Carbine

Specifications
- Mass: 8 pounds 7 ounces (M1896 Rifle)
- Length: 48.875 in (1,241 mm) (M1896 Rifle)
- Barrel length: 30 in (762 mm) (M1896 Rifle)
- Cartridge: .30-40 Krag
- Action: Bolt action
- Rate of fire: 20–30 rounds/min
- Muzzle velocity: 2,000 ft/s (610 m/s) (rifle) (220 grain bullet 1894–1898)
- Effective firing range: 900 m (980 yd)
- Feed system: 5-round capsule magazine
- Sights: V-notch and front post

The Springfield Model 1892–99 Krag–Jørgensen rifle is a Norwegian-designed bolt-action rifle that was adopted in 1892 as the standard United States Army military longarm, chambered for U.S. caliber .30-40 Krag cartridges. All versions and variants were manufactured under license by the Springfield Armory between 1892 and 1903 and famously served as the longarm during the Spanish–American War.

Although "Krags" were popular and efficient, the side loading gate mechanism was slow and cumbersome to reload in combat compared to the clip loaded Spanish Mausers the Krag was up against. Thus, the U.S. Krag was replaced beginning in 1903 with the introduction of the M1903 Springfield rifle, which was essentially a copy of a Mauser, although some design elements of the Krag remained, such as the cocking piece.

American Krags are the most plentiful and affordable of all three Krag variants, although many are sporterized, and they remain popular with collectors today.

== History ==
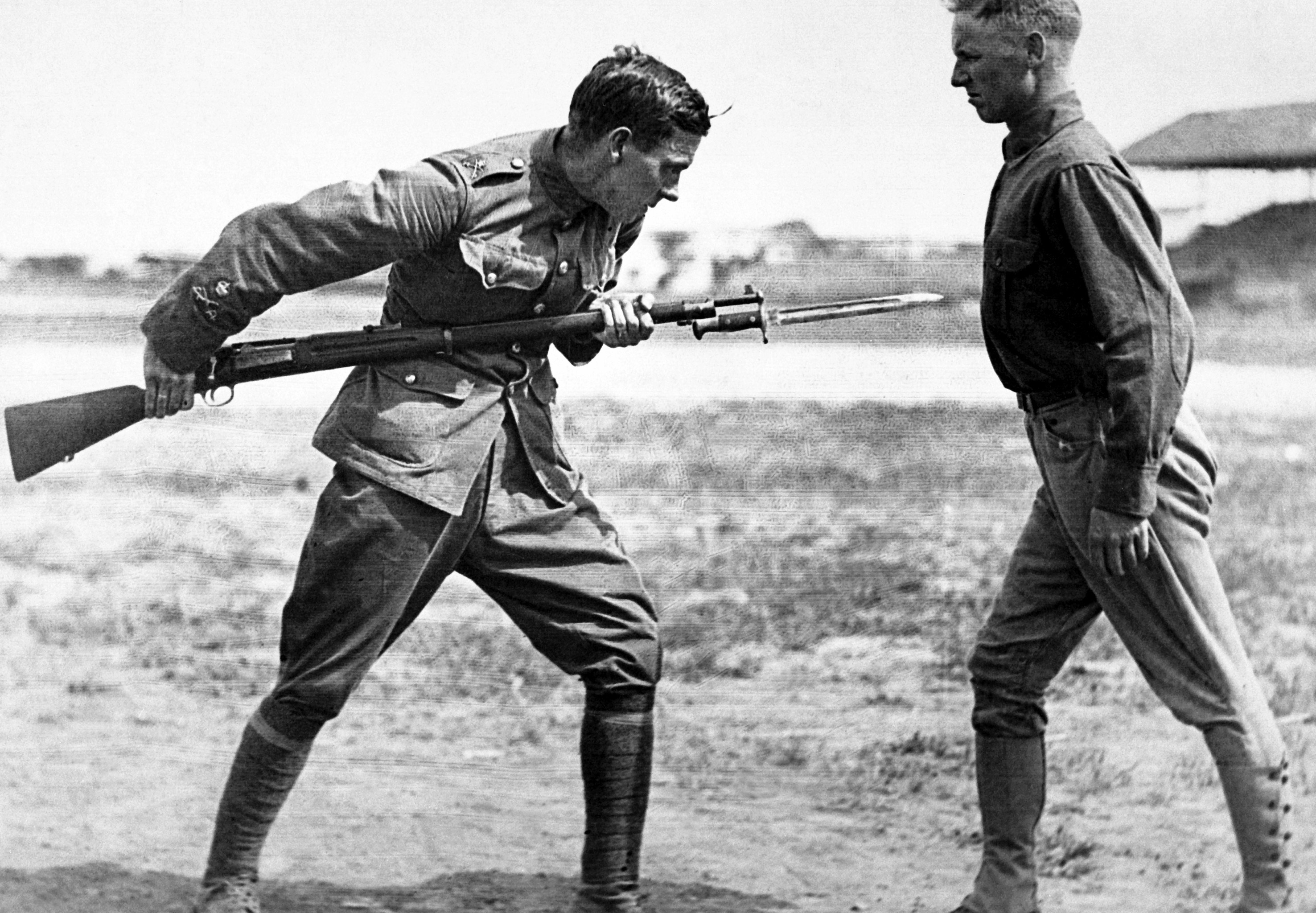
Soldiers practice a bayonet stab with their Krag rifles.

Like many other armed forces, the U.S. Army searched for a new rifle in the early 1890s to replace their old Springfield Model 1873 "trapdoor" single-shot rifles. A competition was held in 1892, comparing rifle designs from Lee, Krag–Jørgensen, Mannlicher, Mauser, Schmidt–Rubin, and about 40 other military and civilian designs. The trials were held at Governors Island, New York. Despite protests from domestic inventors and arms manufacturers—two designers, Russell and Livermore, even sued the U.S. government over the choice—the Krag–Jørgensen design was chosen by the board of officers.

Approximately 500,000 "Krags" were produced at the Springfield Armory in Massachusetts from 1894 to 1904. The Springfield Krag rifles and carbines had been introduced into combat in the later years of the American Indian Wars where its performance surpassed the Trapdoor rifles and carbine where as the Trapdoor was a single shot weapon, but the Krags were five shot. It was the U.S. Army's primary rifle from 1894 to 1903 (when it was replaced by the M1903 Springfield rifle with its ballistically similar .30-03 cartridge), and found use in the Spanish–American War and the Philippine–American War. In this later war the rifle was referred to in a song popular with U.S. Marines, a parody of "Tramp! Tramp! Tramp!", with a verse running:

Damn, damn, damn the Philippinos!
Cock-eyed, kackiack ladrones!
Underneath the starry flag,
Civilize 'em with a Krag,
And return us to our old beloved homes.

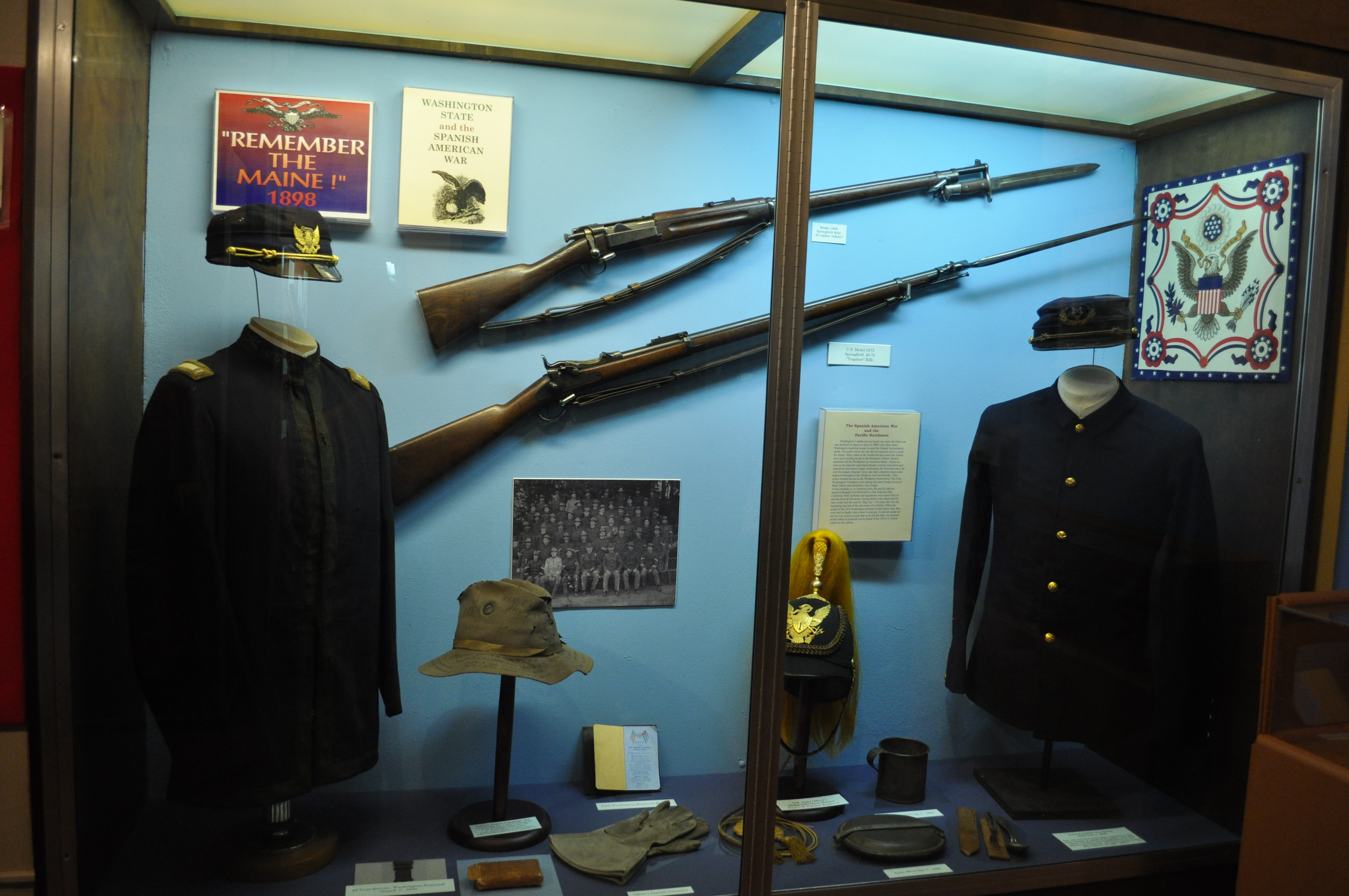
American Springfield Armory Krag (top) in a Spanish–American War museum exhibit.

According to contemporary, perhaps sensationalized accounts, the Krag's complex design was outclassed by the 7mm 1893 Spanish Mauser during the Spanish–American War, and proved ill-suited for use in tropical locales such as Cuba and the Philippines. American soldiers found themselves unable to match the volume of fire displayed by the Spanish 1893 Mauser rifle, with its internal box magazine that could be quickly and fully reloaded with five-round stripper clips, and a high-velocity, flat-shooting 7mm cartridge which was quickly dubbed the "Spanish Hornet".

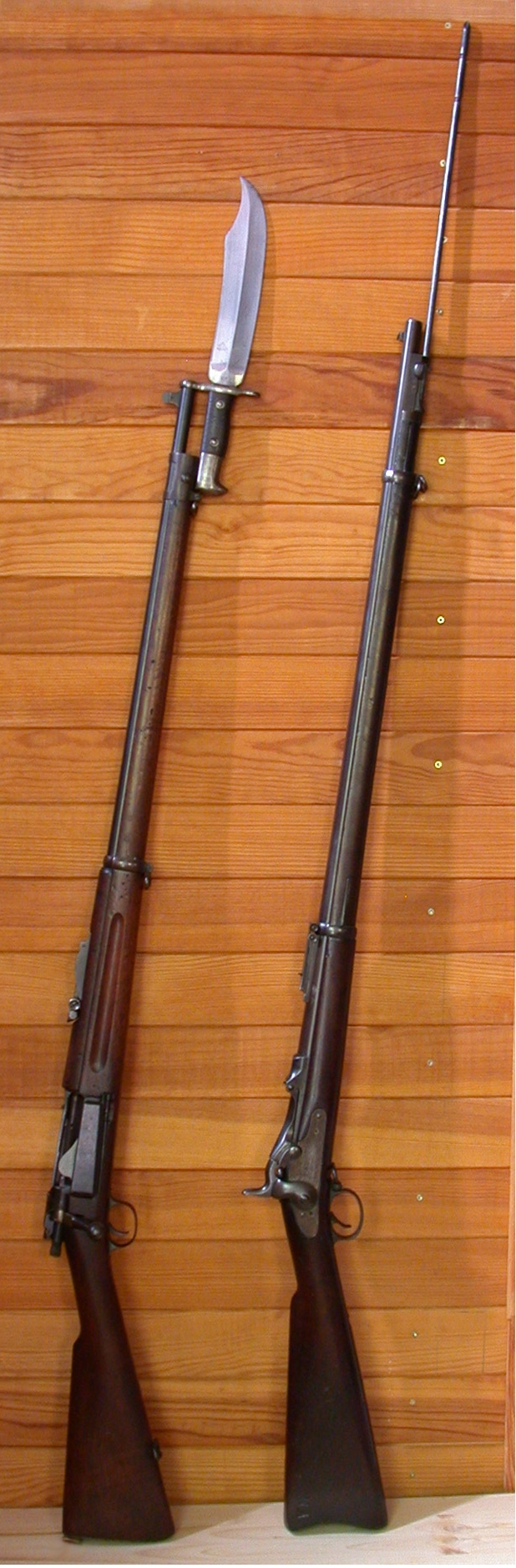
A .30 Springfield Krag rifle and a .45 Springfield Model 1888 rifle.

During the American assault on the strategic Cuban city of Santiago, a small force of 750 Spanish troops armed with Model 1893 Mauser rifles defended positions on San Juan and Kettle hills. The attacking force consisted of approximately 6,600 American soldiers, most of them regulars, armed with the then-new smokeless-powder Krag–Jørgensen rifle and supported by artillery and Gatling gun fire. Though the assault was successful, the Americans soon realized that they had suffered more than 1,400 casualties in the assault. A U.S board of investigation pinned the blame on the superior firepower of the Spanish Model 1893 Mauser rifles, although modern analysis has determined that many of the casualties were due to superior Spanish fortifications on the high ground. With the Krag's replacement with the Mauser-derived M1903, the rifle is tied for the shortest service life of any standard-issue firearm in US military history (1892–1903).

The Krag was phased out of service with the regular Army by 1907, as M1903 Springfields became available; however, the Krag was issued for many more years with the National Guard and the Army Reserve, including service in World War I with rear-echelon U.S. troops in France and as training arms at various Stateside bases. Phased out Krag rifles and carbines were also used by law enforcement agencies such as the U.S Marshals, Texas Rangers Division, and even bounty hunters and local town sheriffs and deputies in the American frontier. In the early 1900s, Indian Agents, men who collect or rounded up Native American children to be taken the Indian Boarding schools, and Indian Boarding School guards, men who were keeping watch on the tribal children, who were working the field leaning to farm or learning a trade, patrolling the school grounds making sure the children did not attempt to run away, were also issued phased out Krags. Later, many were issued to veterans' organizations such as the American Legion, Sons of Union Veterans of the Civil War, and the Veterans of Foreign Wars for use in military ceremonies. Still others were sold to civilians through the Civilian Marksmanship Program, and American Krag rifles are a popular and common military surplus collectible.

=== Variants ===
There were at least nine different models of the U.S. Krag–Jørgensen:

- M1892 Rifle – a rifle with a 30 in (762 mm) barrel and a magazine cut off that operates in the up position. It can be identified by the cleaning rod under the barrel.
- M1892 Carbine – presumably a prototype, as just two are known today. Looks like the M1892 Rifle, but with a 22" barrel.
- M1896 Rifle – rifle model where the magazine cut-off operates in down position and the cleaning rod is moved to butt trap. An improved rear sight and tighter production tolerances gave better accuracy. Stock altered slightly (made thicker).
- M1896 Cadet Rifle – model which was fitted with cleaning rod like M1892 rifle. Only about 400 were made before it was discontinued.
- M1896 Carbine – model with the same modifications as the M1896 Rifle.
- M1898 Rifle – a model that generally much like M1896, but with a wide range of minor changes.
- M1898 Carbine – rifle with same minor modifications as the M1898 Rifle.
- M1899 Carbine – rifle with generally the same as the M1898 Carbine, but with a slightly longer forearm and hand guard, and without the swivel ring.
- M1899 Constabulary carbine – model built for use in the Philippines. Basically a M1899 Carbine fitted with a full length stock and a bayonet lug, and the muzzle stepped down to accept bayonet

== Ammunition ==
The U.S. Krags were chambered for the rimmed .30-40 Krag round, also known as ".30 Army." From 1890 to 1893 a 230-grain steel- or cupro-nickel-jacketed bullet was issued, for which no ballistic data is known. From 1894 to September 1899 a 220-grain jacketed bullet loading was issued using 40 grains of nitrocelluose powder, which developed some 40,000 psi and a muzzle velocity of 2,000 feet per second (610 m/s) in the Krag rifle and 1,960 ft/s (600 m/s) in the shorter carbine.

In October 1899, after reviewing the experiences of the Spanish–American War, a new loading was developed for the .30 Army in an attempt to match the ballistics of the 7×57mm Mauser cartridge. The new loading increased the Krag rifle's muzzle velocity to 2,200 f/s at 45,000 psi. However, once the new loading was issued, reports of cracked locking lugs on service Krags began to surface. In March 1900 the remaining stocks of this ammunition, some 3.5 million rounds, was returned to the arsenals, broken down, and reloaded back to the original 2,000 ft/s (610 m/s) specification.

Although the .30-40 Krag was the first smokeless powder round adopted by the U.S. military, it retained the "caliber-charge" designation of earlier black powder cartridges, thus the .30-40 Krag employs a .30 caliber (7.62 mm) bullet propelled by 40 grains (3 g) of smokeless powder. As with the .30-30 Winchester, the use of black powder nomenclature led to the incorrect assumption that the .30-40 Krag was once a black powder cartridge. As such, the .30-40 Krag round was one of the last cartridges to be named in this fashion.

== See also ==
- Krag–Jørgensen
- Springfield rifle
- M1895 Lee Navy rifle

Preceded by Springfield Model 1884	United States Army rifle 1892–1903	Succeeded by M1903 Springfield

== Sources ==
- Hanevik, Karl Egil (1998). Norske Militærgeværer etter 1867. Hanevik Våpen. ISBN 82-993143-1-3
- "Model 1896 Krag-Jorgensen Rifle" by Patrick McSherry
- ".30-40 Krag ballistics " from Guns&Ammo magazine
- "
