= Springfield model 1873 =

US service rifle from late 1800s

Springfield Model 1873
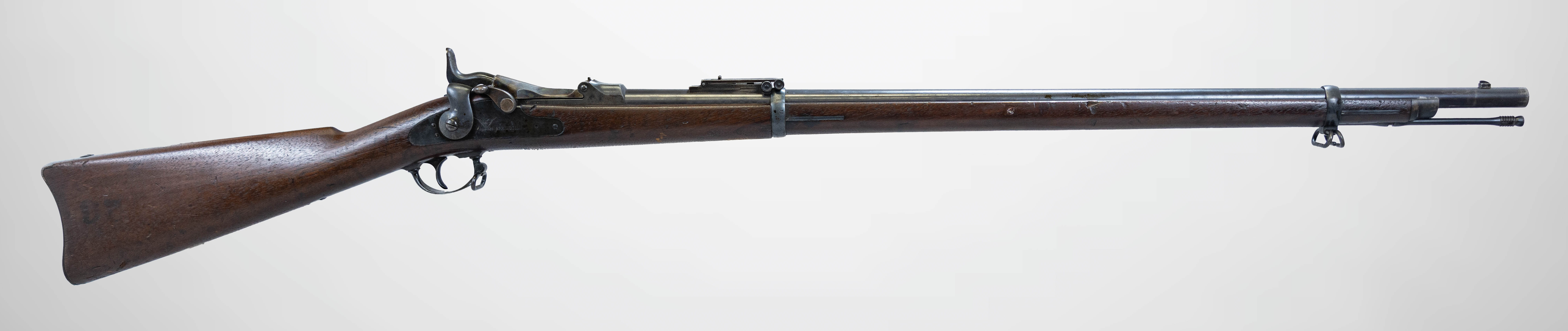
- Type: Breech-loading rifle
- Place of origin: United States

Service history
- In service: 1873–1918
- Used by: United States; Argentina; Hawaiian Kingdom; Native Americans
- Wars: American Indian Wars; Argentine Civil Wars; Spanish–American War; Philippine–American War; World War I

Production history
- Designer: Erskine S. Allin
- Designed: 1872–1873
- Manufacturer: Springfield Armory
- Produced: 1873–1884
- No. built: 567,882
- Variants: Cavalry carbine with 22 in (560 mm) barrel; Cadet rifle with 28 in (710 mm) barrel; Infantry rifle with 30 in (760 mm) barrel

Specifications
- Length: 52 in (1,300 mm)
- Barrel length: 32.5 in (830 mm)
- Cartridge: 1873 Loading .45-70-405 (19,000 psi), 1884 loading 45-70-500 (25,000 psi))
- Caliber: .45 in (11.43 mm)
- Action: Trapdoor
- Rate of fire: 12-13 rounds per minute, up to 25 rounds per minute have been recorded in ordnance department tests
- Muzzle velocity: 1,350 feet per second (410 m/s)
- Maximum firing range: 2,500 yards (2,300 m)
- Feed system: Breech-loading
- Sights: Open sights

The Springfield Model 1873 was a trapdoor breechblock service rifle produced by the Springfield Armory for the United States military. It was the first standard-issue breech-loading rifle adopted by the United States Army (although the Springfield Model 1866 had seen limited issue to troops along the Bozeman Trail in 1867). The rifle, in both full-length and carbine versions, was widely used in subsequent battles against Native Americans and was also issued in limited numbers to volunteer units in the Spanish-American War and the Philippine Insurrection.

The Model 1873 was the fifth variation of the Erskine S. Allin trapdoor breechblock design. The infantry rifle model featured a 325/8-inch (829 mm) barrel, while the cavalry carbine used a 22-inch (560 mm) barrel. It was superseded by an improved model, the Springfield Model 1884, also in .45-70 caliber.

== Selection process ==
From 1872 to 1873, a military board headed by Brigadier-General Alfred H. Terry conducted an examination and trial of 99 rifles from several domestic and foreign manufacturers, including those from Springfield, Sharps, Peabody, Whitney, Spencer, Remington, and Winchester, pursuant to the selection of a breech-loading system for rifles and carbines for the U.S. Military. The trials included tests for accuracy, dependability, rate-of-fire, and ability to withstand adverse conditions. Both single-shot and magazine fed systems were considered but, at the time, the single-shot was deemed to be more reliable and cheaper to mass-produce. Firing tests were held at the Springfield Armory and Governor's Island, where the average rate of fire for the Springfield was 8 rounds per minute for new recruits and 15 rounds per minute for experienced soldiers. The board recommended the "No. 99 Springfield" which became the Model 1873.

== Ballistics as recorded in the 1874 and 1887 US Ordnance Department Reports ==
The rifle cartridge was designated as ".45-70-405", indicating a .45 caliber (11.63 mm) bore diameter, with 70 grains (4.5 g) of black powder, propelling a 405-grain (26.2 g) bullet. It had a muzzle velocity of 1,350 feet per second (410 m/s). A reduced-power load of 55 grains (3.6 g) of powder (Carbine Load) was manufactured for use in the carbine to lighten recoil for mounted cavalry soldiers.

The Springfield Model 1884 had a muzzle velocity of 1315.7 feet per second with a 500 grain lead bullet. The muzzle velocity of the carbine bullet was 1,150 feet per second. The Model 1884 rifle generated 1525 ft lbs of energy at 100 yds, and 562.3 ft lbs of energy at 1,000 yards, with a maximum range of 3,500 yards.

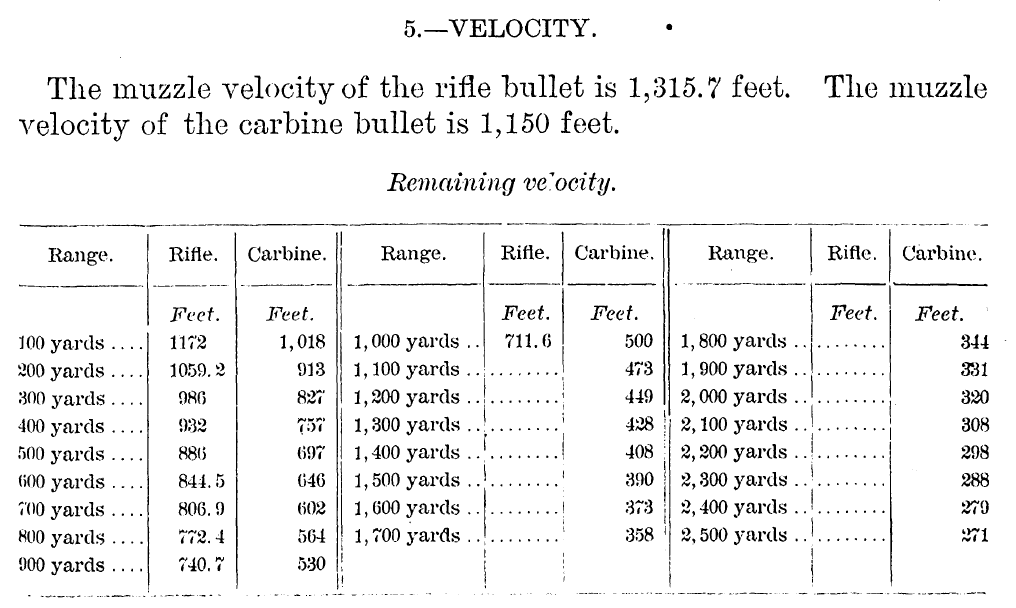
Velocity chart for the Springfield Model 1884

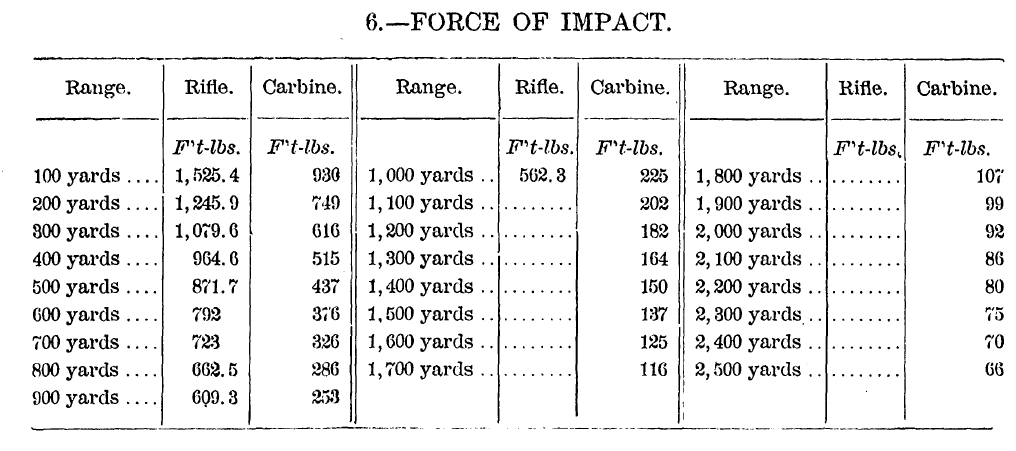
Force of Impact Chart for the Springfield Model 1884

Operating chamber pressure of the Springfield Model 1873, firing the 45-70-405, is 19,000 psi The operating chamber pressure of the Springfield Model 1884, firing the 45-70-500, is 25,000 psi.

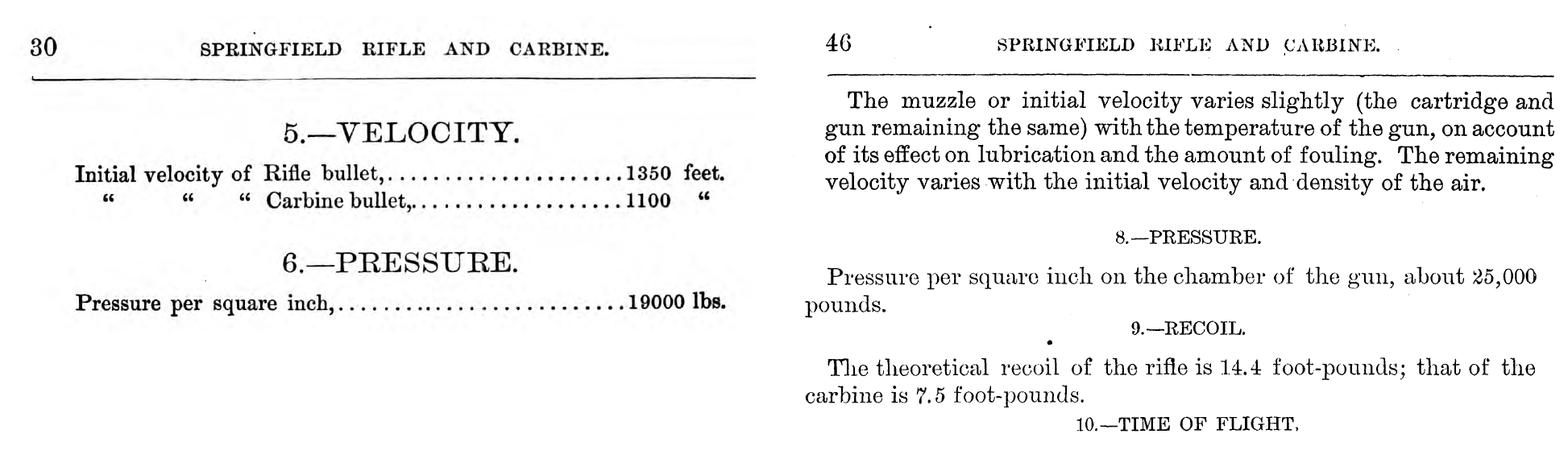
According to the US Army Ordnance Department tests, the 45-70-405 was loaded to 19,000 psi, while the 45-70-500 was loaded to 25,000 psi

The average accuracy of the Springfield Model 1873 was a circle with an average radius of 1.7 inches at 100 yards, corresponding to an ~3.4 MOA. The average accuracy of the Springfield Model 1884 was a circle with an average radius of 1.3 inches at 100 yards, corresponding to ~2.6 MOA. Therefore, the accuracy potential of the average Springfield Model 1884 is comparable to that of the German K98k or Springfield's later M1 Garand.

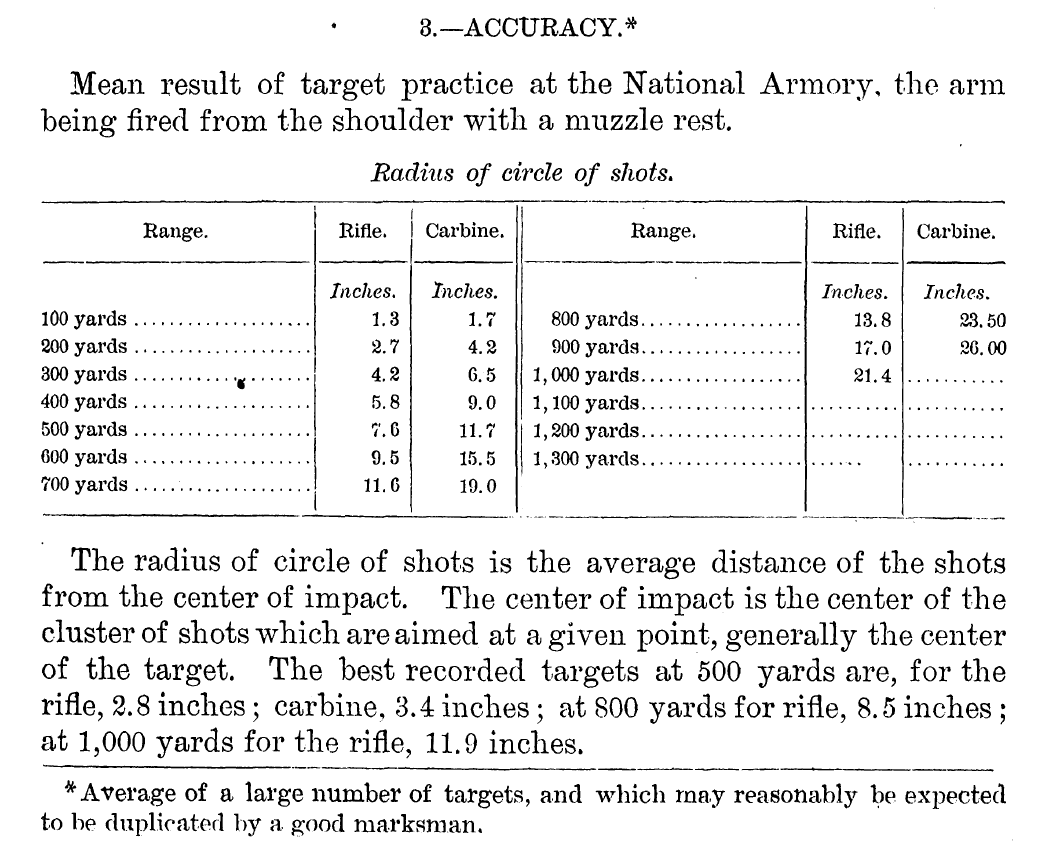
Accuracy chart for the Springfield Model 1884

U.S. ordnance department tests report that "A practiced person can fire this arm from 12 to 13 times per minute, loading from the cartridge-box. (It has been fired from the shoulder at the rate of 25 times per minute from the cartridge-box)."

== Use in combat ==
The rifle was originally issued with a copper cartridge case until 1888, when the Army transitioned to brass cartridges. Poor quality control and poor storage conditions often led to the cartridge expanding in the barrel and jamming the weapon.

Original U.S. Ordnance Department instructions for the extracting stuck cartridges write: "Should the head of a cartridge come off in the act of firing, the best mode of extracting the shell is to take out a ball from a cartridge and reduce it with a knife or by rolling, so that it can be inserted into the muzzle of the barrel. Ram the ball hard with the ramrod when the breech-block is closed; this will upset the ball and fill the headless shell. Open the breech-block and the ball and shell can be easily pushed out with the ramrod." Soldiers were later issued with a purpose-built headless-shell extractor to remedy case-head separations and jams. Soldiers also used their knives to pry out stuck casings.

After the defeat of Lieutenant-Colonel George Armstrong Custer's battalion (armed with the carbine and carbine load ammunition) at the Battle of the Little Bighorn in June 1876, investigations first suggested that jamming of their carbines, which did not come with a built-in cleaning rod, may have played a factor, although archaeological excavations in 1983 discovered evidence that only 3.4 percent of the casings recovered showed any indication of being pried from jammed weapons. This did not account for cases removed by a cleaning rod or other objects nor for jammed rifles cleared away from the immediate battle area and outside the very limited archaeological survey area. Troops under Major Marcus A. Reno had multiple soldiers busy removing stuck casings from carbines passed rearward to them before reloading and passing them to the firing line.

A limited number of M1873 rifles were purchased by Argentina during the civil conflict between the Autonomist-led Nationalists, the Liberal-led Nationalists, and the Federalist rebels.

In 1877 the Ordnance Department began researching European firearms that used brass casings, finding that they were much stronger than copper casings. It was not until 1888 that the Army switched from copper to brass cartridges. This was a major improvement, and brass became the primary material used in United States military cartridges from then to the present.

The black powder Model 1873 continued to be the main service rifle of the U.S. military until it was gradually replaced by the Springfield Model 1892 bolt action rifle, a derivative of the Norwegian Krag–Jørgensen action. Replacement began in 1892, and despite its obsolescence, the Model 1873 was still used by secondary units during the Spanish–American War in Cuba and the Philippines, where it was at a major disadvantage against Spanish forces armed with the 7 mm Spanish Model 1893 Mauser bolt-action rifle. However, despite its obsolescence, the Springfield trapdoor would continue to see use for training and stateside security purposes as late as World War I.

== Pictorial chronology ==
Historical depictions of the Springfield Model 1873

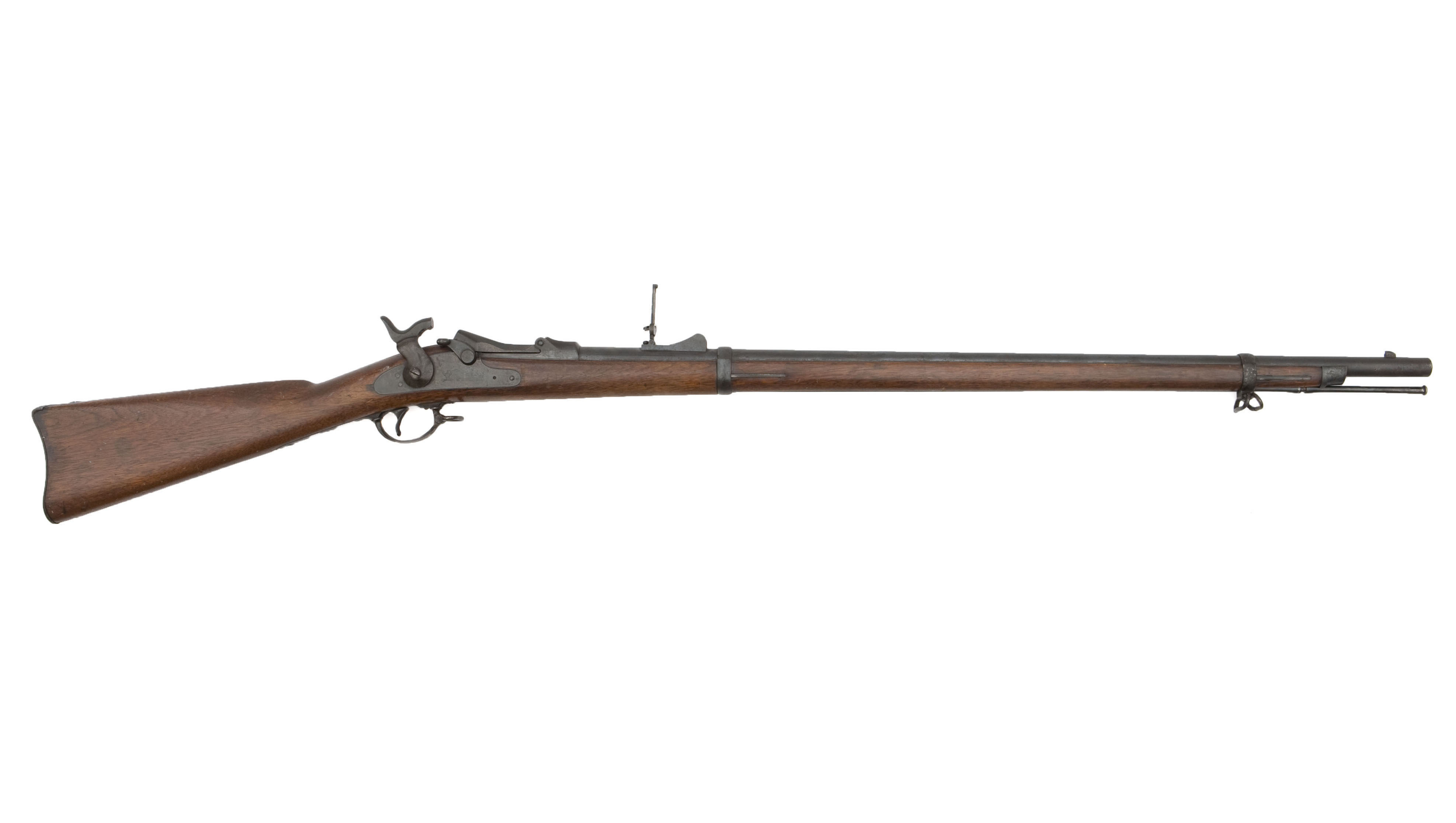
Springfield Model 1873 rifle

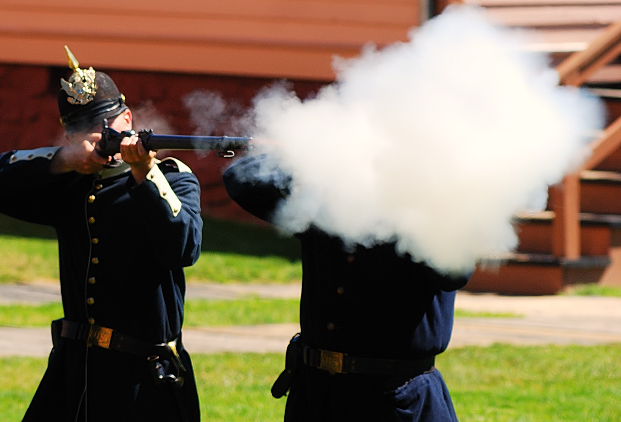
Reenactment firing a Springfield Model 1873 breech-loading rifle at Fort Mackinac in 2008

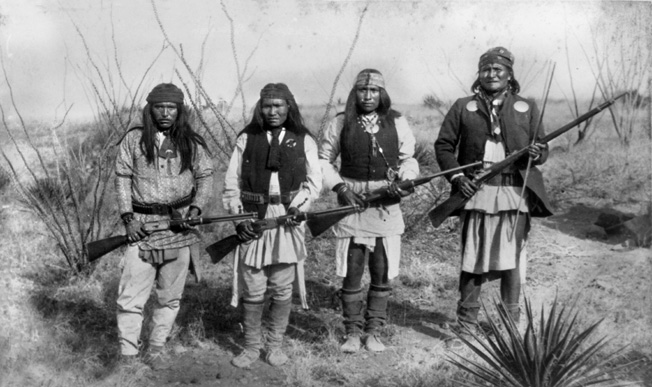
Geronimo (right) holding a Springfield Model 1873 alongside his fellow Apache warriors in 1886

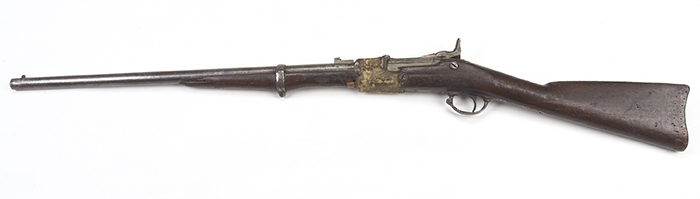
Custer Era Springfield .45 caliber trapdoor carbine, ca. 1875

== See also ==
- Springfield rifle

Preceded by Springfield Model 1870	United States military rifle 1873–1884	Succeeded by Springfield Model 1884
