= .45-70 =

Rifle cartridge designed by the U.S. Army

.45-70 Government
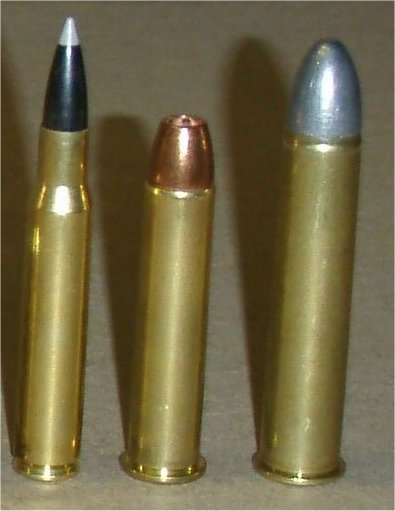
- From left, .30-06, .45-70, and .50-90 Sharps
- Type: Rifle
- Place of origin: United States

Service history
- In service: 1873–1892
- Used by: United States
- Wars: Indian Wars, Spanish–American War, Philippine–American War, Moro Rebellion

Production history
- Designer: United States Army
- Designed: 1872
- Produced: 1873–present
- Variants: .45-70 +P

Specifications
- Case type: Rimmed, straight
- Bullet diameter: .458 in (11.6 mm)
- Neck diameter: .480 in (12.2 mm)
- Base diameter: .505 in (12.8 mm)
- Rim diameter: .608 in (15.4 mm)
- Rim thickness: .070 in (1.8 mm)
- Case length: 2.105 in (53.5 mm)
- Overall length: 2.550 in (64.8 mm)
- Primer type: Large rifle
- Maximum pressure (CIP): 32,000 psi (220 MPa)
- Maximum pressure (Original .45–70-405 loading): 19,000 psi (130 MPa)
- Maximum pressure (Original .45–70-500 loading): 25,000 psi (170 MPa)
- Maximum CUP: 28,000 CUP

Ballistic performance
Bullet mass/type	Velocity	Energy
405 gr (Original Government .45–70-405 Rifle Load test data published in 1874) lead RN	1,350 ft/s (410 m/s)	1,638 ft⋅lbf (2,221 J)
500 gr (Original Government .45–70-500 Rifle Load test data published in 1887) lead RN	1,315.7 ft/s (401.0 m/s)	1,921 ft⋅lbf (2,605 J)
405 gr (Original Government 45-55-405 Carbine Load test data published in 1887) lead RN	1,150 ft/s (350 m/s)	1,189 ft⋅lbf (1,612 J)
300 gr (Standard) JHP	2,069 ft/s (631 m/s)	2,852 ft⋅lbf (3,867 J)
300 gr (Strong) JHP	2,275 ft/s (693 m/s)	3,449 ft⋅lbf (4,676 J)
- Test barrel length: 32.6"; Sources: Springfield Armory (U.S.) (1874). Description and Rules for the Management of the Springfield Rifle, Carbine, and Army Revolvers, Caliber 45. U.S. Government Printing Office. Springfield Armory (U.S.) (1887). Description and Rules for the Management of the Springfield Rifle, Carbine, and Army Revolvers, Caliber 45. U.S. Government Printing Office. Accurate Powder

The .45-70 (11.6×53mmR), also known as the .45-70 Government, .45-70 Springfield, and .45-2 1/10" Sharps, is a .45 caliber rifle cartridge originally holding 70 grains of black powder that was developed at the U.S. Army's Springfield Armory for use in the Springfield Model 1873. It was a replacement for the stop-gap .50-70 Government cartridge, which had been adopted in 1866, one year after the end of the American Civil War, and is known by collectors as the "Trapdoor Springfield".

== Original ballistics of the .45-70-405 and -500 ==
The original .45-70 loading was designated .45–70–405, referring to a .45 caliber bullet, 70 grains of black powder, and a 405 grain lead round nose bullet. It had a muzzle velocity of 1,350 feet per second (410 m/s). A reduced-power load of 55 grains (3.6 g) of powder (Carbine Load) was manufactured for carbine use with a muzzle velocity of 1,150 feet per second (350 m/s).

In 1884, the US Ordnance Department increased the bullet weight of the .45–70 to .45–70–500, or a 45 caliber bullet, 70 grains of black powder, and a 500 grain bullet. The new .45–70-500 loading was recorded with a muzzle velocity of 1315.7 feet per second, and generated 1525 ft lbs of energy at 100 yds, and 562.3 ft lbs of energy at 1,000 yards, with a maximum range of 3,500 yards.

The operating chamber pressure of the Springfield model 1873, firing the .45–70–400, is 19,000 psi, while that of the Springfield Model 1884, firing the .45–70–500, is 25,000 psi.

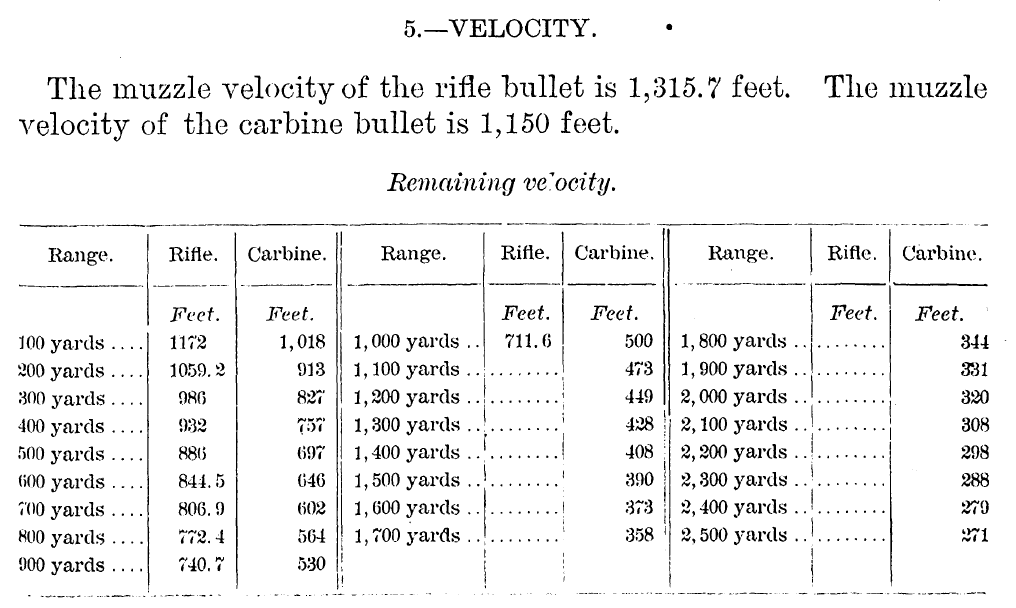
Velocity chart for the Springfield Model 1884

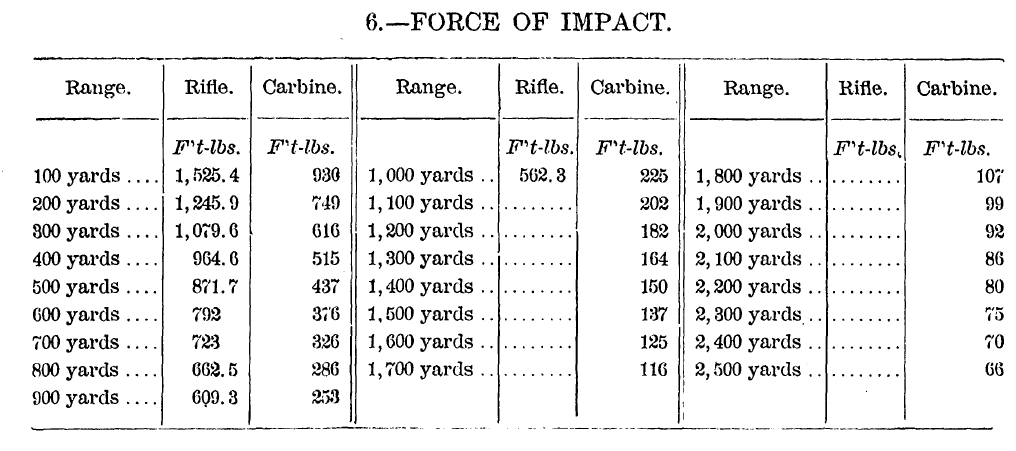
Force of Impact Chart for the Springfield Model 1884

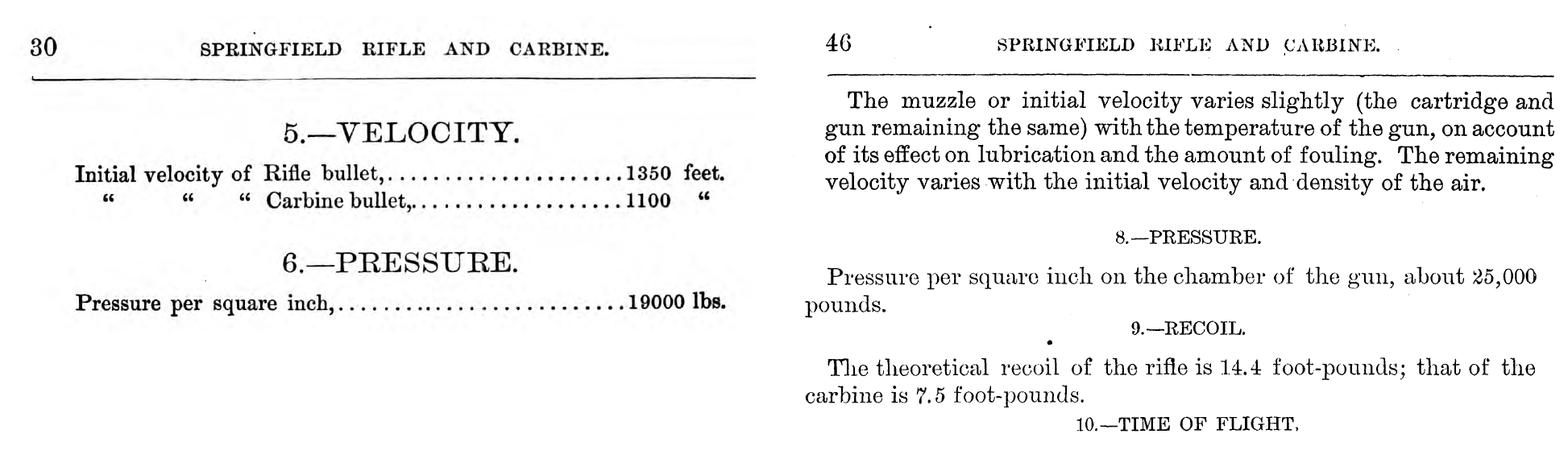
According to the US Army Ordnance Department tests, the .45-70-405 was loaded to 19,000 psi, while the .45-70-500 was loaded to 25,000 psi

== Nomenclature ==
The new cartridge was completely identified as the .45-70-405, but was also referred to as the ".45 Government" cartridge in commercial catalogs. The nomenclature of the time was based on three properties of the cartridge:

- .45: nominal diameter of bullet, measured in decimal inches, i.e., 0.458 in (11.63 mm);
- 70: volume of black powder, measured in grains, i.e., 70 grains (4.54 g);
- 405: weight of lead bullet, measured in grains, i.e., 405 grains (26.24 g).

The minimum acceptable accuracy of the .45-70 from the 1873 Springfield was approximately 4 inches (100 mm) at 100 yards (91 m), however, the heavy, slow-moving bullet had a "rainbow" trajectory, the bullet dropping multiple yards (meters) at ranges greater than a few hundred yards (meters). A skilled shooter, firing at a known range, could consistently hit targets that were 6 × 6 feet (1.8 m) at 600 yards (550 m)—the Army standard target. It was a skill valuable mainly in mass or volley fire, since accurate aimed fire on a man-sized target was effective only to about 200–300 yards (180–270 m).

In 1879 the US Army conducted a series of rifle tests at Sandy Hook Proving Ground. The tests used a slightly longer cartridge at 2.1 inches, loaded with 80 grains of black powder, initially using both the 405 grain and 500 grain bullets, in order to compare it to the British Martini-Henry 577-450 cartridge. Following the tests a new variation of the .45-70 cartridge was produced: the .45-70-500, which fired a heavier, 500-grain (32 g) bullet. The heavier bullet produced significantly superior ballistics and could reach ranges of 3,350 yd (3,060 m), which were beyond the maximum range of the .45-70-405. While the effective range of the .45-70 on individual targets was limited to about 1,000 yd (910 m) with either load, the heavier bullet produced lethal injuries at 3,500 yards (3,200 m). At those ranges, the bullets struck point-first at a roughly 30-degree angle, penetrating three 1-inch (2.5 cm) thick oak boards, and then traveled to a depth of eight inches (20 cm) into the sand of the beach. It was hoped the longer range of the .45-70-500 would allow effective volley fire at ranges beyond those normally expected of infantry fire.

=== Bullet diameter ===
While the nominal bore diameter was .450 inches (11.4 mm), the groove diameter was actually closer to .458 inches (11.6 mm). As was standard practice with many early commercially produced U.S. cartridges, specially-constructed bullets were often "paper patched", or wrapped in a couple of layers of thin paper. This patch served to seal the bore and keep the soft lead bullet from coming in contact with the bore, preventing leading (see internal ballistics). Like the cloth or paper patches used in muzzle-loading firearms, the paper patch fell off soon after the bullet left the bore. Paper-patched bullets were made of soft lead, .450 inches (11.4 mm) in diameter. When wrapped in two layers of thin cotton paper, this produced a final size of .458 inches (11.6 mm) to match the bore. Paper patched bullets are still available, and some black-powder shooters still "roll their own" paper-patched bullets for hunting and competitive shooting. Arsenal loadings for the .45-70-405 and .45-70-500 government cartridges generally used groove diameter grease groove bullets of .458 inches (11.6 mm) diameter.

== History ==
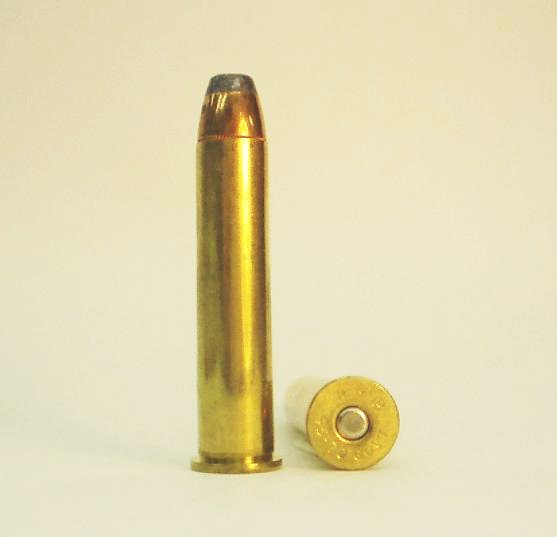
.45-70 Government cartridge showing the rimmed case profile and headstamp markings.

The predecessor to the .45-70 was the .50-70-450 cartridge, adopted in 1866 and used until 1873 in a variety of rifles, many of them were percussion rifled muskets converted to trapdoor action breechloaders. The conversion consisted of milling out the rear of the barrel for the trapdoor breechblock, and placing a .50 caliber "liner" barrel inside the .58 caliber barrel. The .50-70 was popular among hunters, as the bullet was larger than the .44 caliber and also hit harder (see terminal ballistics), but the military decided as early as 1866 that a .45 caliber bullet would provide increased range, penetration and accuracy. The .50-70 was nevertheless adopted as a temporary solution until a significantly improved rifle and cartridge could be developed.

The result of the quest for a more accurate, flatter shooting .45 caliber cartridge and firearm was the Springfield trapdoor rifle. Like the .50-70, the .45-70 used a copper center-fire case design. A reduced power loading was also adopted for use in the Trapdoor carbine. This had a 55-grain (3.6 g) powder charge.

Also issued was the .45-70 "Forager" round, which contained a thin wooden bullet filled with birdshot, intended for hunting small game to supplement the soldiers' rations. This round in effect made the .45-70 rifle into a 49 gauge shotgun.

The .45-caliber Springfield underwent a number of modifications over the years, the principal one being a strengthened breech starting in 1884. A new, 500-grain (32 g) bullet was adopted in that year for use in the stronger arm. The M1873 and M1884 Springfield rifles were the principal small arms of the U.S. Army until 1893.

The .45-70 round was also used in several Gatling gun models from 1873 until it was superseded by the .30 Army round beginning with the M1893 Gatling gun. Some .45-70 Gatling guns were used on U.S. Navy warships launched in the 1880s and 1890s.

The Navy used the .45-70 caliber in several rifles: the M1873 and M1884 Springfield, the Model 1879 Lee Magazine Navy contract rifle, and the Remington-Lee, the last two being magazine-fed turnbolt repeating rifles. The Marine Corps used the M1873 and M1884 Springfield in .45-70 until 1897, when supplies of the new M1895 Lee Navy rifle in 6mm Lee Navy, adopted two years before by the Navy, were finally made available.

Realizing that single-shot black-powder rifles were rapidly becoming obsolete, the U.S. Army adopted the Norwegian-designed .30-40 Krag caliber as the Springfield Model 1892 in 1893. However, the .45-70 continued in service with the National Guard, Navy, and Marine Corps until 1897. The .45-70 was last used in quantity during the Spanish–American War (1898), and was not completely purged from the inventory until well into the 20th century. Many surplus rifles were given to reservation Indians for subsistence hunting and now carry Indian markings.

The .45-70 cartridge is still used by the U.S. military today, in the form of the "cartridge, caliber .45, line throwing, M32", a blank cartridge which is used in a number of models of line throwing guns used by the United States Navy and the United States Coast Guard. Early models of these line throwing guns were made from modified Trapdoor and Sharps rifles, while later models are built on break-open single-shot rifle actions.

== Sporting use ==
=== Early sporting use ===
As has become the contemporary norm with military ammunition, the .45-70 was an immediate hit among sportsmen, and the .45-70 has survived to the present day. Today, the traditional 405-grain (26.2 g) load is considered adequate for any North American big game within its range limitations, including larger carnivores such as brown bear and polar bear, and it does not destroy edible meat on smaller herbivores such as pronghorn and deer, due to the bullet's low velocity.

It is very good for big-game hunting in dense brush or heavy timber where the range is usually short. The .45-70, when loaded with the proper bullets at appropriate velocities, has been used to hunt the African "big-five". The .45-70 thus demonstrates great versatility, being capable of hunting any four legged creatures, perhaps because its ability to maintain contemporary improvements within modern weapons capable of handling increased pressure cartridges.

=== Trajectory and sights ===
The trajectory of the bullets is very steep, which makes for a very short point-blank range. This was not a significant problem at the time of introduction, as the .45-70 was a fairly flat-shooting cartridge for its time.

Shooters of these early cartridges had to be keen judges of distance, wind and trajectory to make long shots; the Sharps rifle, in larger calibers such as .50-110 Winchester, was used at ranges of 1,000 yards (910 m).

Most modern shooters use much higher velocity cartridges, relying on the long point-blank range, and rarely using telescopic sights' elevation adjustments, calibrated iron sights, or hold-overs.

Sights found on early cartridge hunting rifles were quite sophisticated, with a long sighting radius, wide range of elevation, and vernier adjustments to allow precise calibration of the sights for a given range.

Even the military "creedmoor"-type rifle sights were calibrated and designed to handle extended ranges, flipping up to provide several degrees of elevation adjustment if needed.

The .45-70 is a popular choice for black-powder cartridge shooting events, and replicas of most of the early rifles, including Trapdoor, Sharps, and Remington single-shot rifles, are often available.

=== Modern rifles and handloading ===
The .45-70 is a long-range caliber, and accurate use requires knowledge of windage and elevation by minute of angle and a sense for estimating distance in these calculations. The .45-70 retains great popularity among American hunters, and is still offered by several commercial ammunition manufacturers. Even when loaded with modern smokeless powders, pressures are usually kept low for safety in antique rifles and their replicas.

Various modern sporting rifles are chambered for the .45-70, and some of these benefit from judicious handloading of homemade ammunition with markedly higher pressure and ballistic performance. Others, which reproduce the original designs still take the original load, but are not strong enough for anything with higher pressures.

In a rifle such as the Siamese Mauser (commonly converted to fire .45-70 due to it being the only Mauser 98 derivative designed to feed rimmed cartridges, and the limited availability of ammunition for its original 8×50mmR chambering) or a Ruger No. 1 single-shot rifle, it can be handloaded to deliver good performance even on big African game.

The .45-70 has also been used in double rifles since the development of the Colt 1878 rifle and the more modern replicas, like the Kodiak Mark IV.

=== Handgun use ===
In addition to its traditional use in rifles, Thompson Center Arms has offered a .45-70 barrel in both pistol and rifle lengths for their "Contender" single-shot pistol, one of the most potent calibers offered in the Contender frame.

Even the shortest barrel, 14 inches (36 cm), is capable of producing well over 2,500 foot-pounds force (3,400 J) of energy, double the power of most .44 Magnum loadings, and a Taylor KO Factor as high as 40 with some loads.

Recent .45-70 barrels are available with efficient muzzle brakes that significantly reduce muzzle rise and also help attenuate the recoil. The Magnum Research BFR is a heavier gun at approximately 4.5 pounds (2.0 kg), helping it have much more manageable recoil.

Only with the recent introduction of large caliber revolver cartridges, such as the .460 S&W Magnum and the .500 S&W Magnum, have production handguns begun to serve as an equal alternative to the .45-70 Contender in the field of big-game hunting handguns.

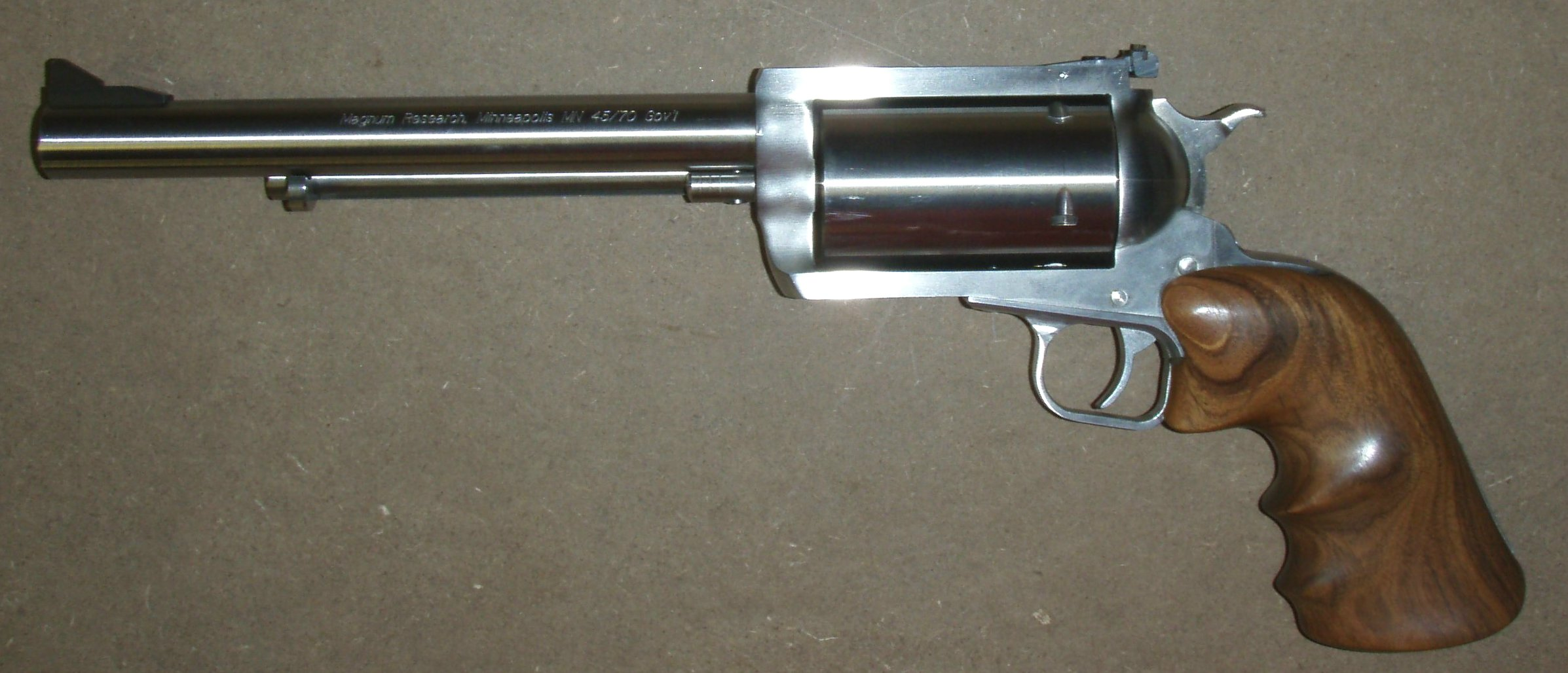
Magnum Research BFR in .45/70 Govt

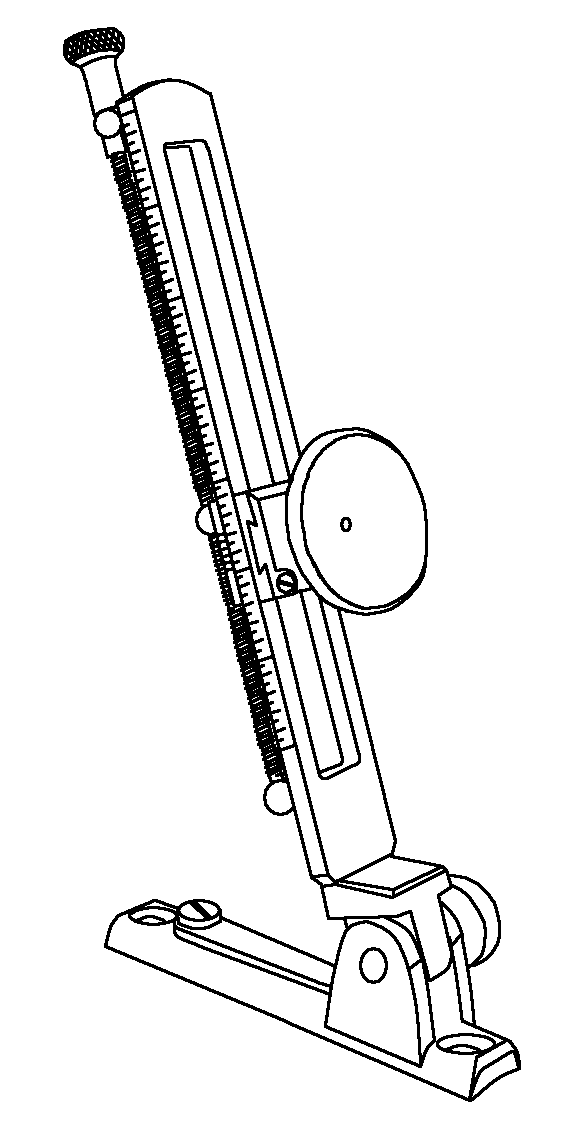
A long-range tang sight, commonly used on black-powder cartridge rifles

A graph showing the relative trajectories of the .45-70-405 and the 7.62×51mm/.308 Winchester out to 1,600 yards (1,500 m)

== See also ==
- 11 mm caliber
- .444 Marlin
- .450 Bushmaster
- .450 Marlin
- .458 SOCOM
- List of rimmed cartridges
- List of rifle cartridges
- Table of handgun and rifle cartridges
