= List of individual weapons of the U.S. Armed Forces =

This is a list of weapons served individually by the United States armed forces. While the general understanding is that crew-served weapons require more than one person to operate them, there are important exceptions in the case for both squad automatic weapons (SAW) and sniper rifles. Within the Table of Organization and Equipment for both the United States Army and the United States Marine Corps, these two classes of weapons are considered as crew-served; the operator of the weapon has an assistant who carries additional ammunition and associated equipment, acts as a spotter, and is also fully qualified in the operation of the weapon. These weapons are listed under the List of crew-served weapons of the U.S. armed forces.

== Bayonets, knives, and bayonet-knife models ==
=== In active service (some branches or limited roles) ===
- Aircrew Survival Egress Knife (US Army Aircrew and USMC Aircrew)
- M9 bayonet (M16 series compatible)
- M7 bayonet (M16 series compatible)
- M11 knife (EOD)
- OKC-3S bayonet (USMC)
- Ka-Bar combat knife (USMC)
- Gerber Mark II dagger
- Mk 3 knife (USN SEALs)
- Mission Knives MPK Knife (USN SEALs, USN EOD, and USMC)
- Strider SMF (USMC)
- SEAL Knife 2000 (USN SEALs)
- Tomahawk (VTAC)
- Entrenching tool
ASEK

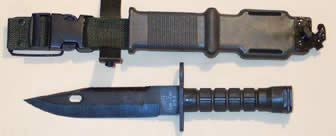
M9 bayonet and M10 scabbard 'product improved' sheath

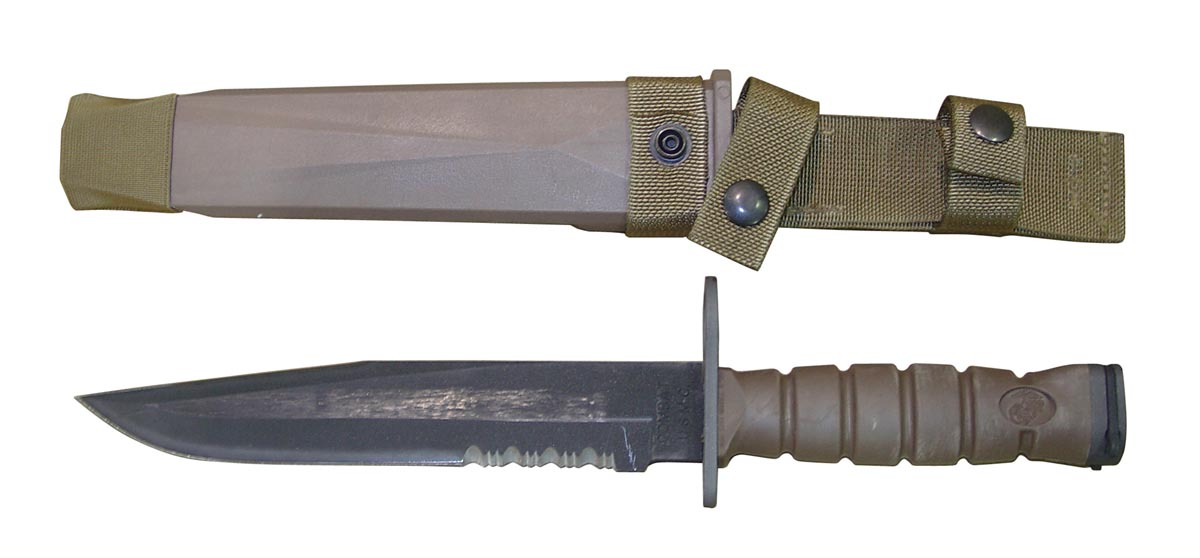
OKC-3S bayonet

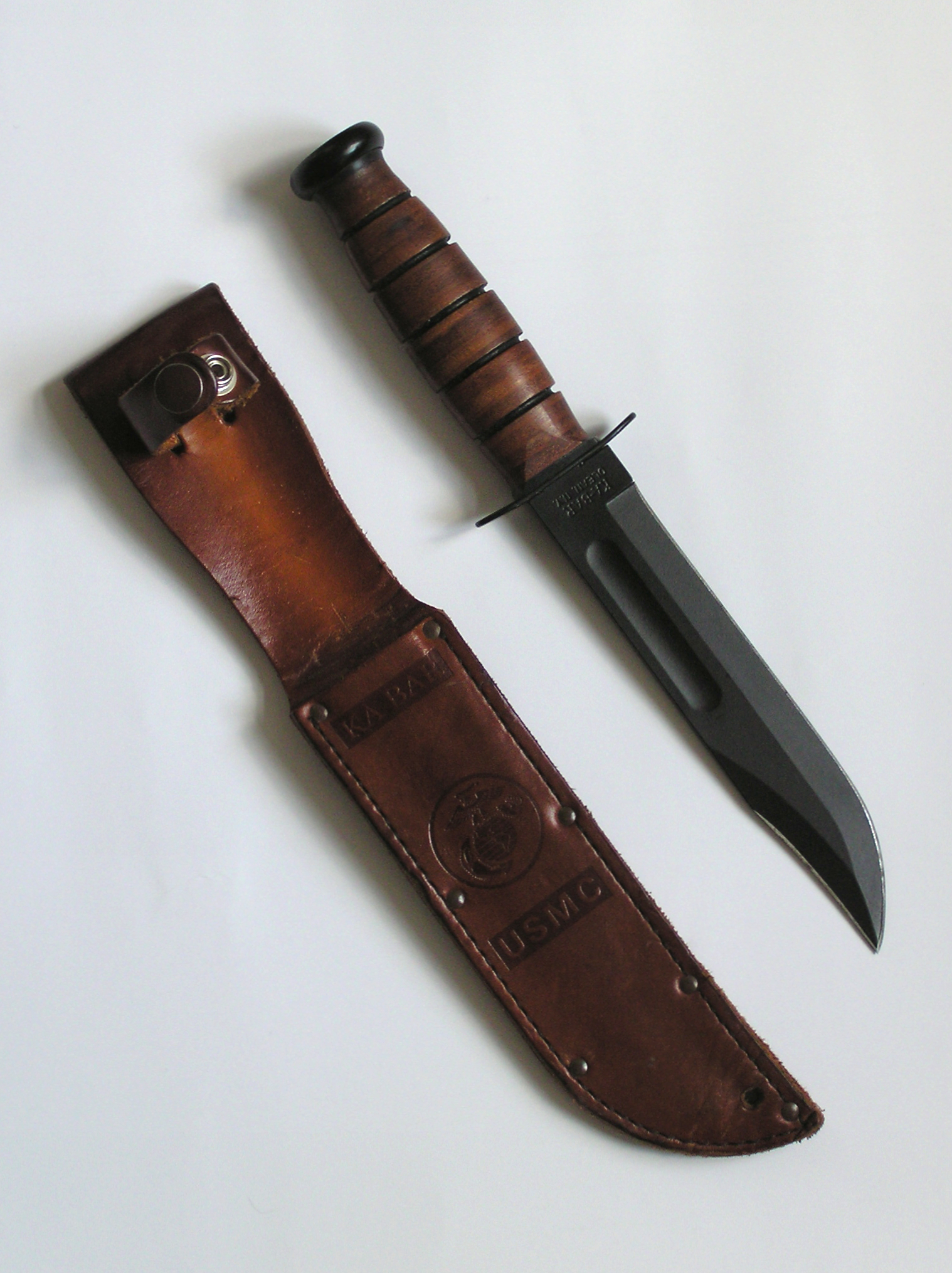
Ka-Bar knife

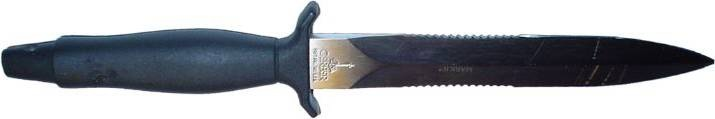
Gerber Mark II

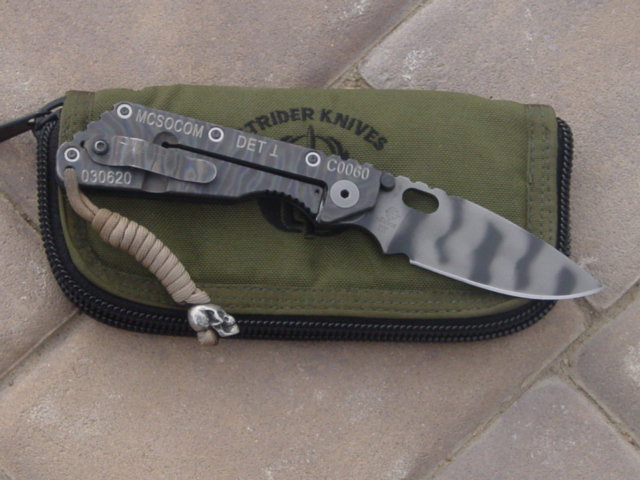
Strider SMF

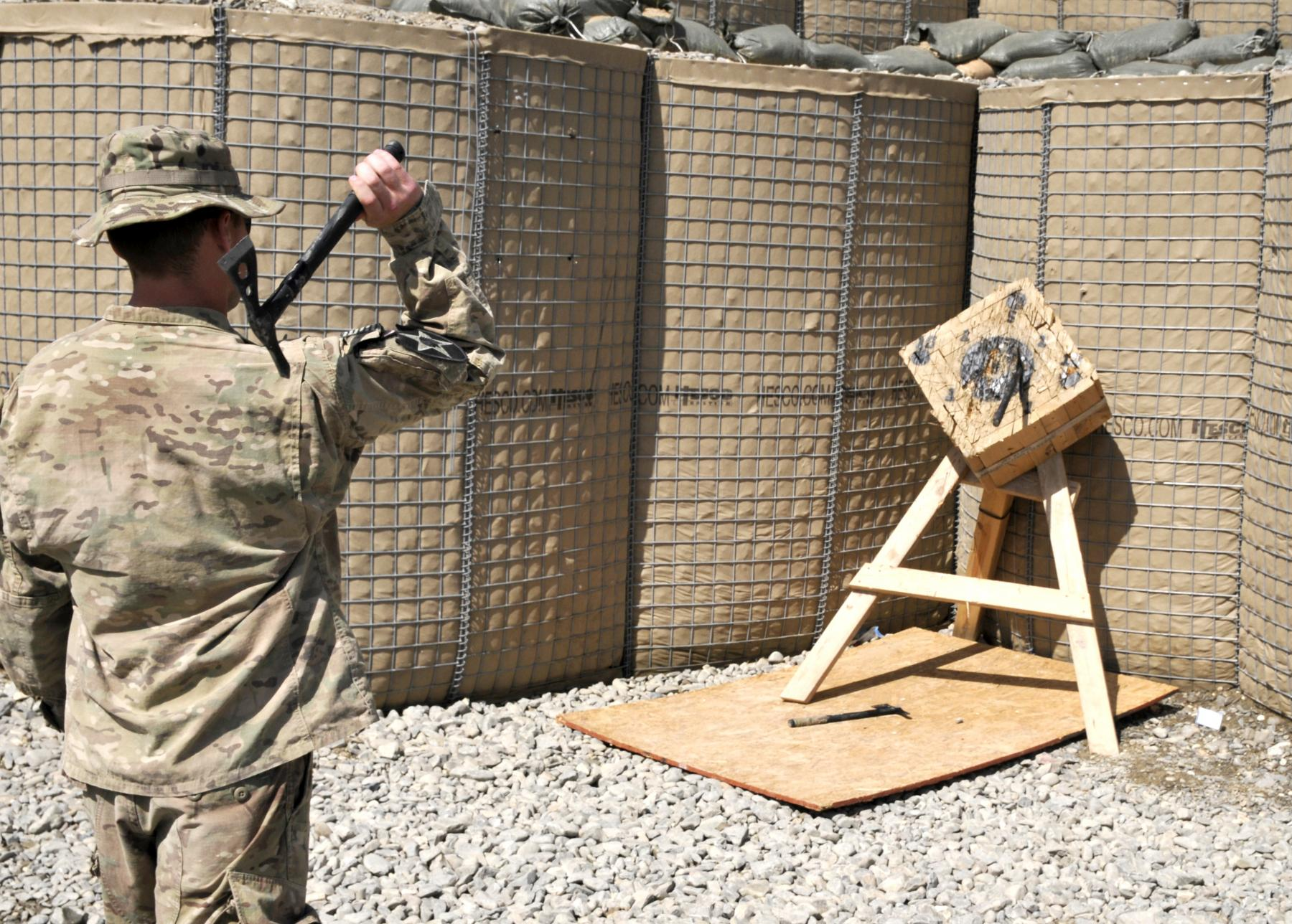
Tomahawk

=== Out of service (obsolete) ===
- Knife LC-14-B/Type IV Survival Ax (Woodman's Pal)
- Marine Corps Raiders stiletto by Camillus
- Mk 1 Utility Knife (Navy)
- Mk 2 Machete (Navy)
- Mk 2 Utility Knife (Marine Corps/Navy)
- M1 bayonet (M1 Garand/M1903)
- M3 Trench Knife
- M4 Bayonet (M1 Carbine)
- M5 Bayonet (M1 Garand)
- M6 Bayonet (M14)
- M1795 Bayonet
- M1812 Bay
- M1816 Bayonet
- M1819 Hall Breech-Loading Rifle Socket Bayonet
- M1841 Mississippi Rifle Bayonet
- M1847 Musketoon Bayonet
- M1849 Rifleman's Knife
- M1855 Socket Bayonet
- M1861 Navy Rifle Bayonet
- M1868 Trowel Bayonet
- M1873 Trowel Bayonet
- M1880 Hunting Knife (a.k.a. Entrenching knife)
- M1887 Hospital Corps Knife
- M1898 Bolo Bayonet
- M1898 Bowie Bayonet
- M1892 Bayonet (Krag)
- M1895 Lee Rifle Bayonet
- M1904 Hospital Corps Knife
- M1905 Bayonet (M1903/M1 Garand)
- M1909 Bolo Knife
- M1917 Bayonet (M1917 Rifle, M1897, M12 and M1200 Shotguns)
- M1917 Bolo Knife
- M1917/M1918/Mark I Trench Knife
- M1939 Machete
- M1942 Bayonet (M1903 Springfield/M1 Garand)
- M1942 Bolo Knife (United States Navy Hospital Corpsman)
- M1942 Machete
- Sykes-Fairbairn Commando Knife
- V-42 combat knife (Case V-42 'Stiletto')
- V44 Knife

== Grenades ==
=== In active service ===
- M67 fragmentation grenade
- AN/M14 thermite grenade
- AN/M8 white smoke grenade
- AN/M18 colored smoke grenade
- M7A3 CS Gas Grenade
- M25A2 Riot Control Grenade
- M47 Riot Control Grenade
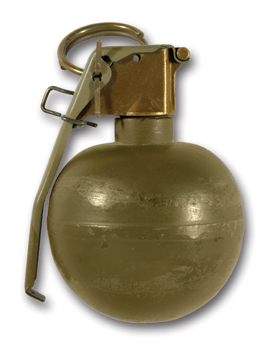
M67 fragmentation grenade

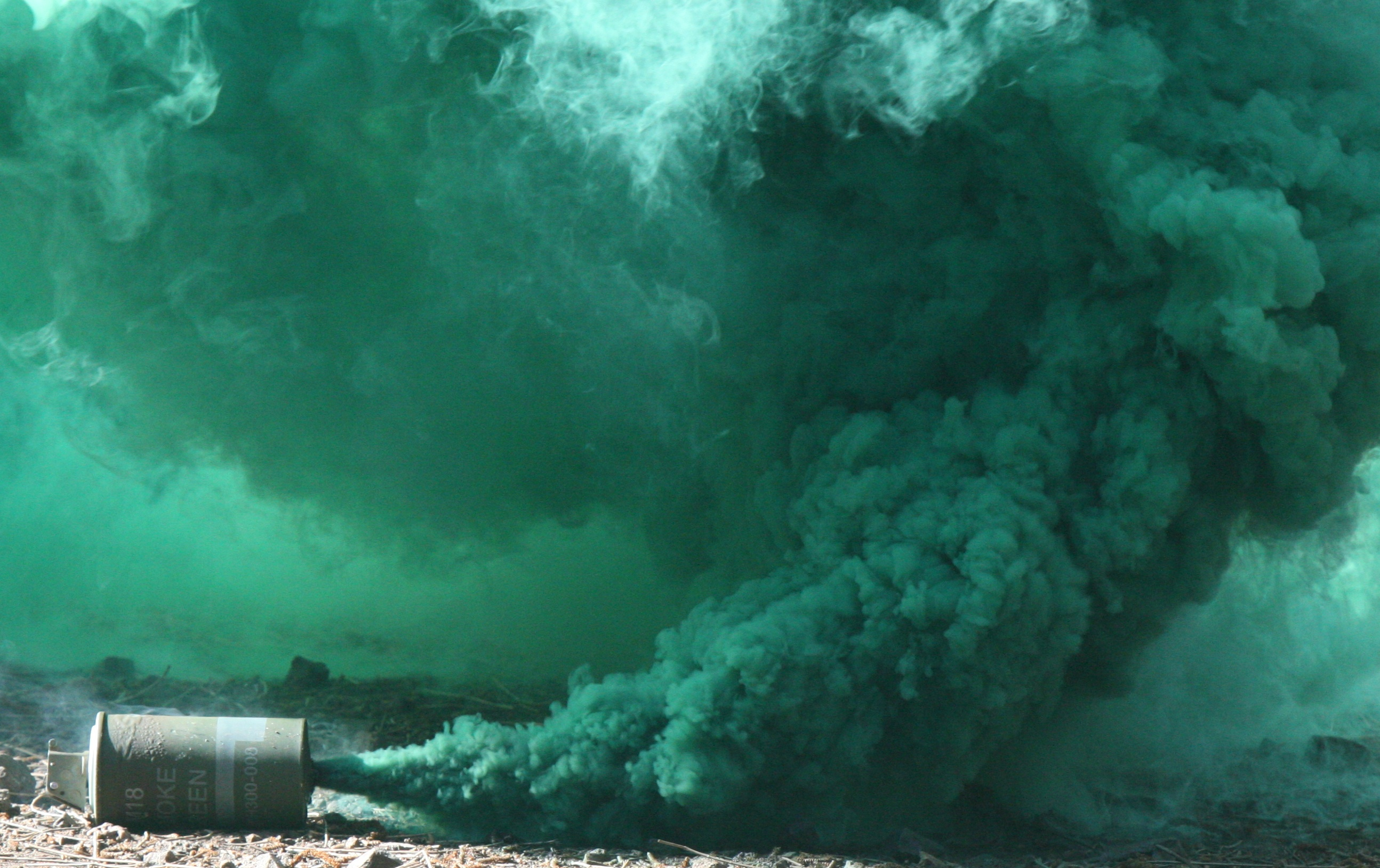
Smoke billowing from a green M18

=== In active service (some branches or limited roles) ===
- AN/M83 White Smoke Grenade
- M84 stun grenade
- M116/A1 "Flash Crash"
- Mk 141 Mod 0
- M100 Grenade Rifle Entry Munition (GREM)
- Scalable Offensive Hand Grenade (SOCOM)
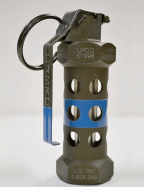

=== Out of service (obsolete) ===
- MK3/3A1/3A2 Concussion Grenade
- M25/A1
- M7/A1/A2
- M6/A1
- Mk 1 Mod 0/1/2/3
- M34
- M16
- M15
- M8
- M33
- M61
- M26/A1
- Mk II/IIA1 (aka Mk 2/2A1) (Frag)
- M1 Frangible
- Ketchum Grenade (Civil War era)
- V40 Mini-Grenade
- XM48/E1/E2/E3
- XM58
- EX 1 Mod 0
- EX 2 Mod 0
- Model 308-1 (Never standardized)
- Kilgore/Schermuly Stun
- T13 Beano Grenade
- F1 (M1916 Billant Fuse)

== Sidearms ==
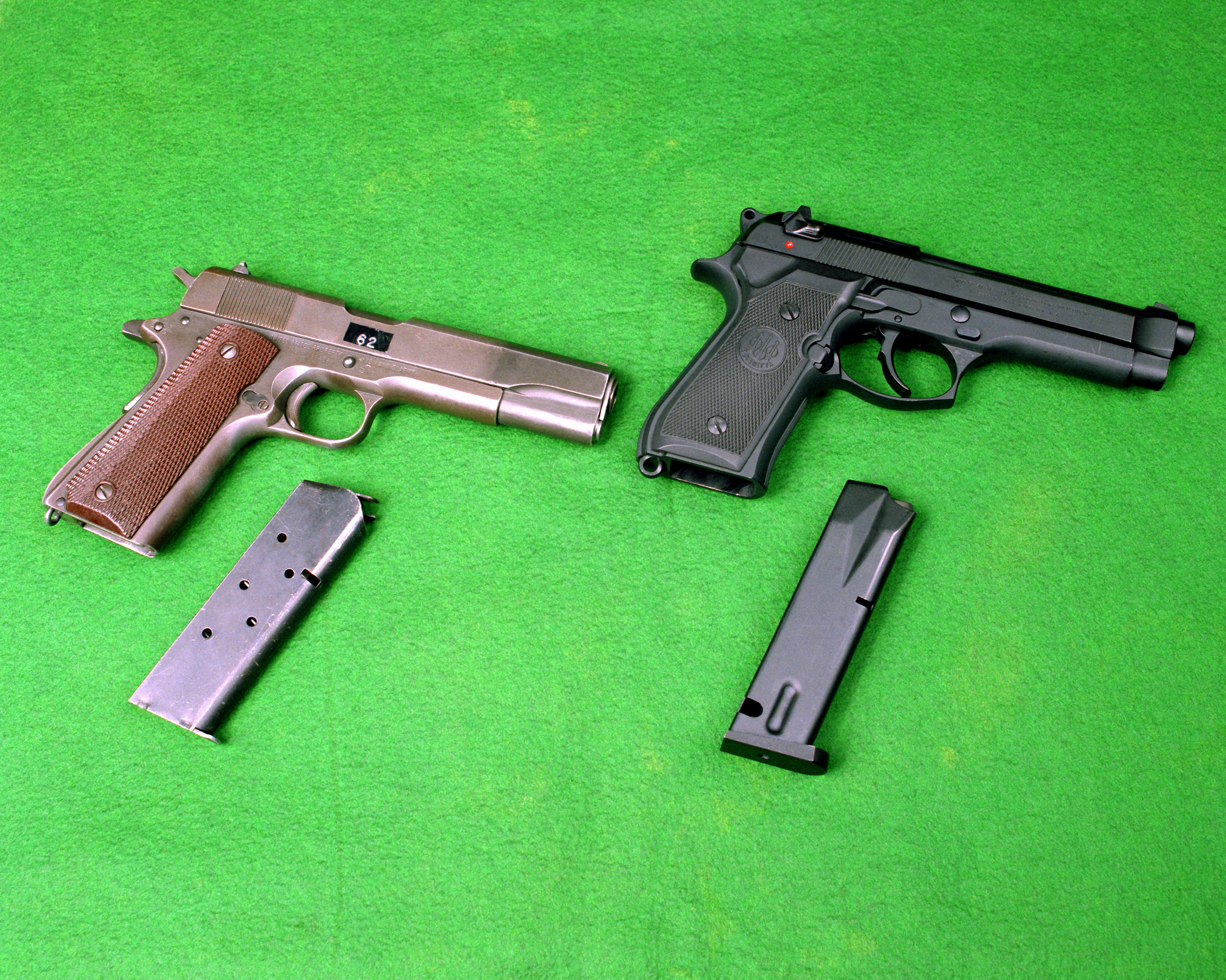
The M1911A1 and M9 pistol.

=== In active service ===
- Beretta M9 (9×19mm)
- SIG Sauer M11 (P228) (9×19mm)
- SIG Sauer M17 Modular Handgun System (P320 Full-Size) (9×19mm) – Was selected by the US Army to replace the M9 after winning the XM17 Modular Handgun System competition
- SIG Sauer M18 Modular Handgun System (P320 Carry) (9×19mm) – Was selected by the US Army, Navy, Marines and Air Force to replace the M11 after winning the XM17 Modular Handgun System competition.
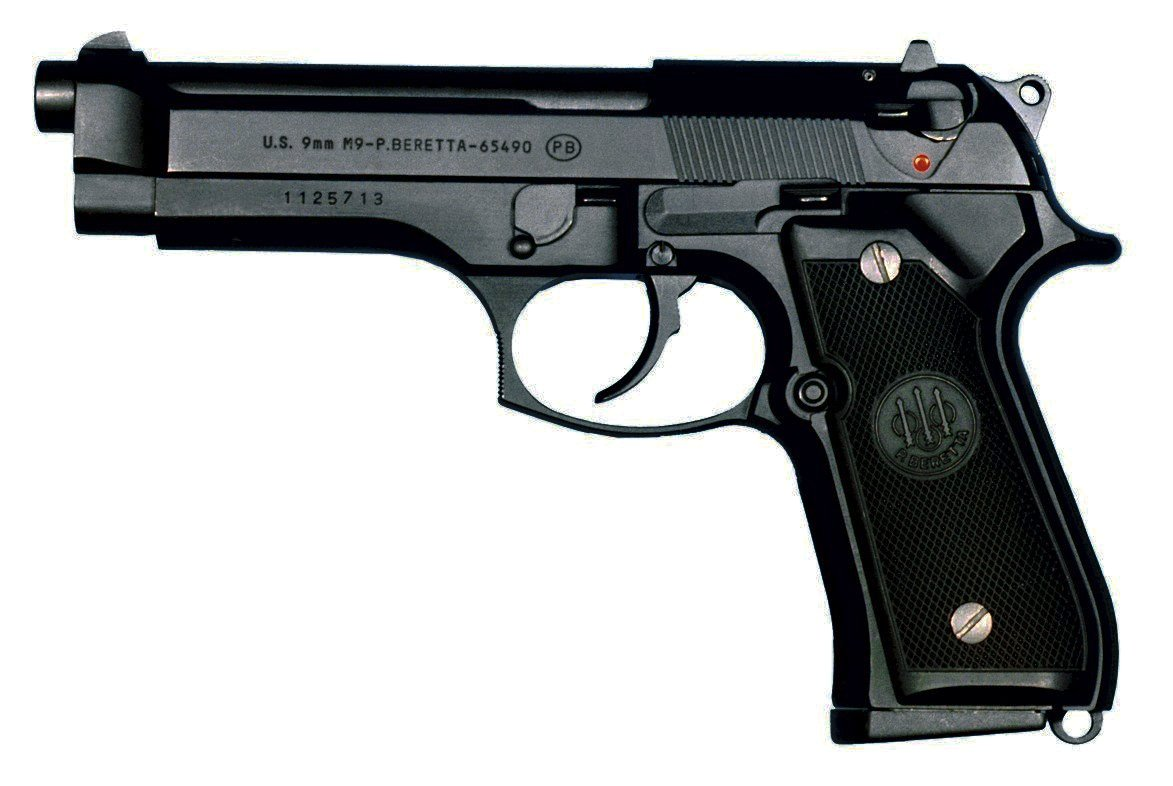
Beretta M9

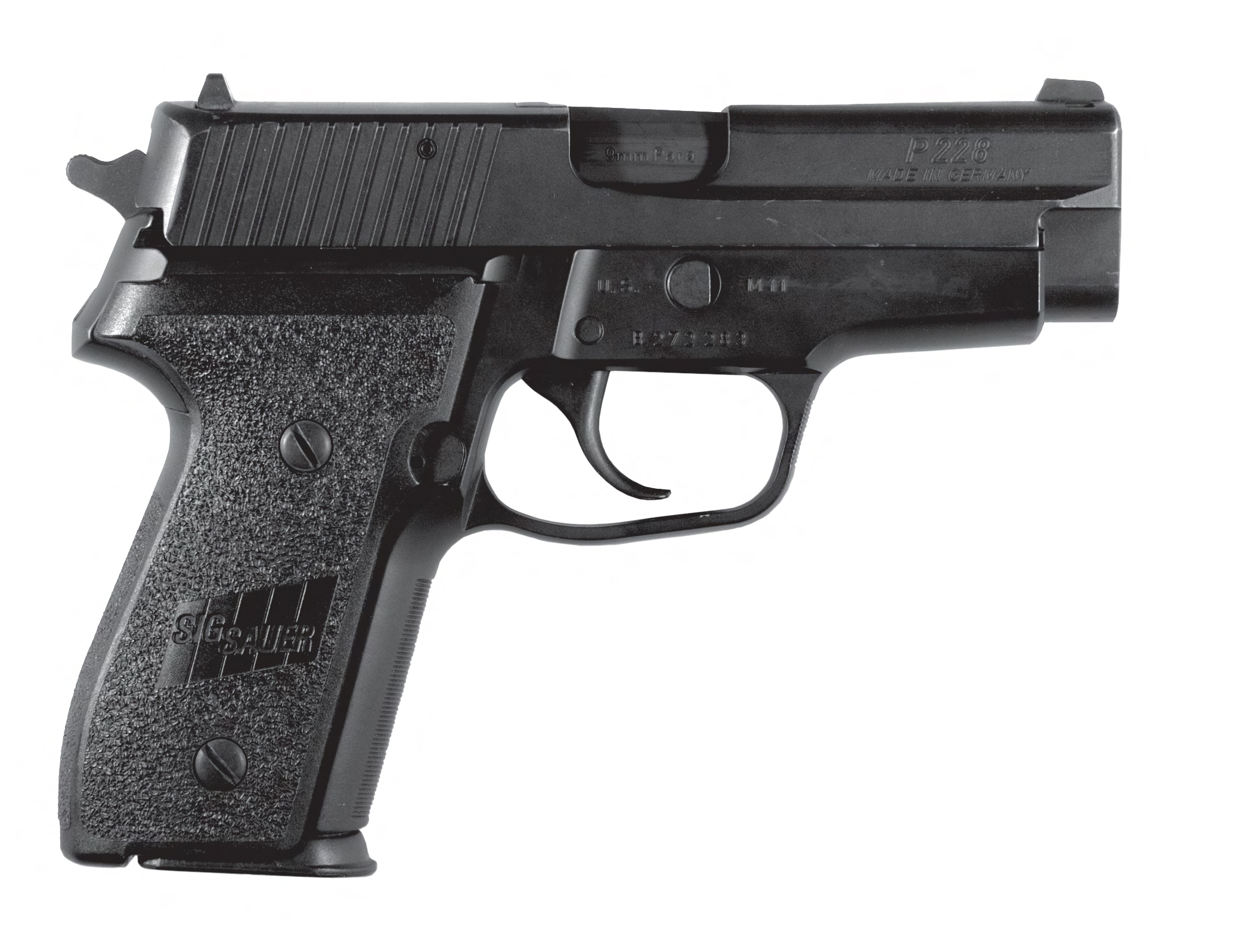
SIG Sauer M11

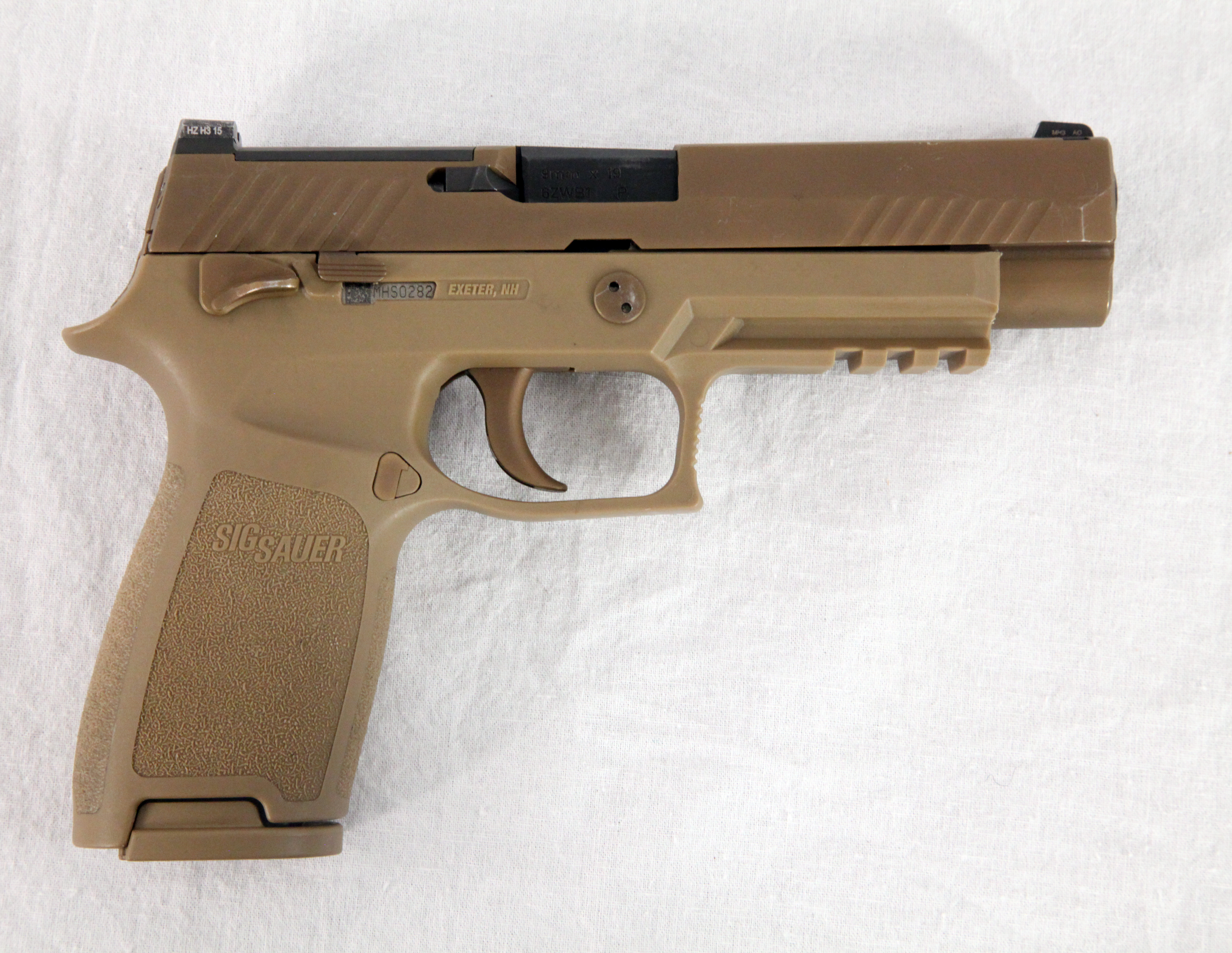
SIG Sauer M17

=== In active service (some branches or limited roles) ===
- Beretta M9A1 (9×19mm) (USMC)
- Colt M1911A1 (.45 ACP) (as the M45A1 CQBP)
- Heckler & Koch P11 (Underwater Pistol) (7.62×36mm rocket-propelled darts) (USSOCOM)
- SIG Sauer P229R DAK (.40 S&W) (USCG)
- Glock Mk 26 Mod 0 (Glock 26) (9×19mm) (USSOCOM)
- Glock Mk 27 Mod 0 (Glock 19) (9×19mm) (USCG, USSOCOM)
- Glock Mk 28 Mod 0 (Glock 17) (9×19mm) (USSOCOM)
- Glock Mk 29 Mod 0 (Glock 34) (9×19mm) (USSOCOM)
- M45A1 CQBP (Close Quarters Battle Pistol) (.45 ACP) (USMC)
- Heckler & Koch MK 23 Mod 0 (.45 ACP) (USSOCOM)
- SIG Sauer Mk 25 Mod 0 (P226) (9×19mm) (NAVSPECWAR) - To be replaced by Glock Mk 27 Mod 0 (Glock 19)
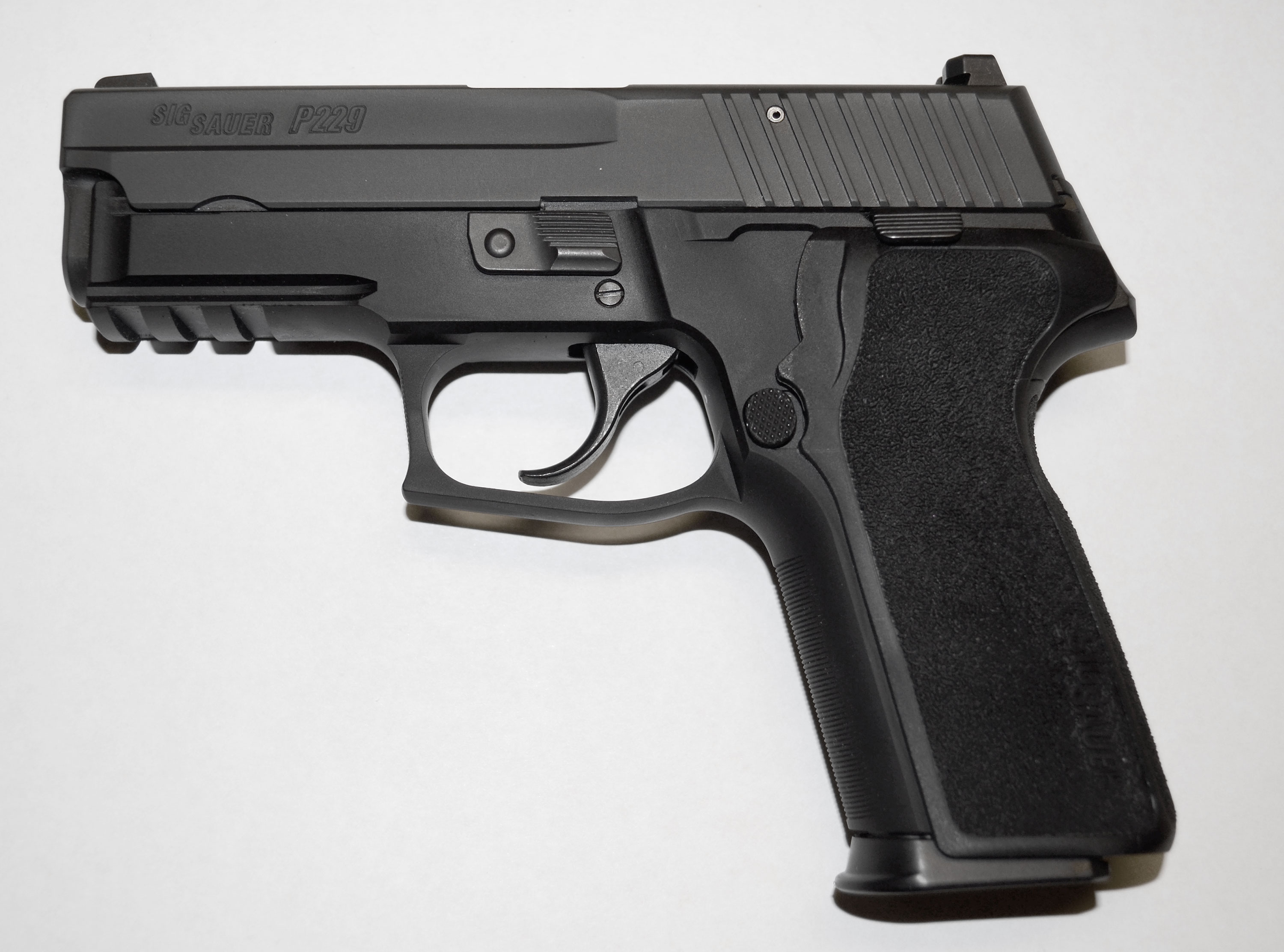
P229R DAK

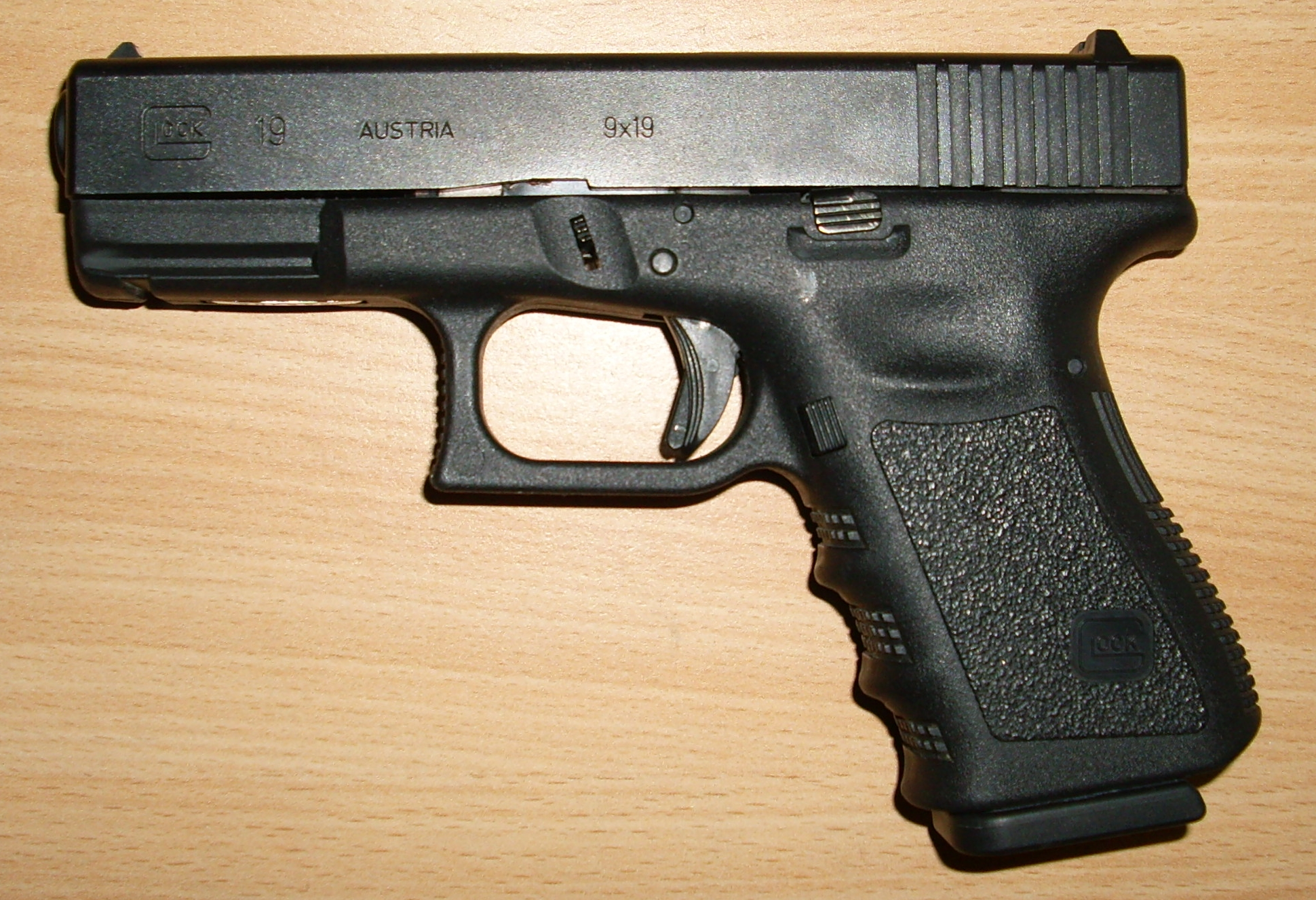
Glock 19

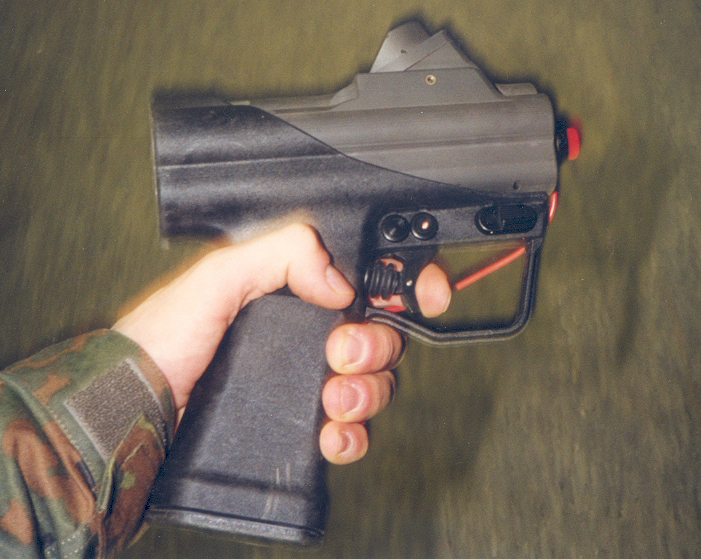
P11 underwater pistol

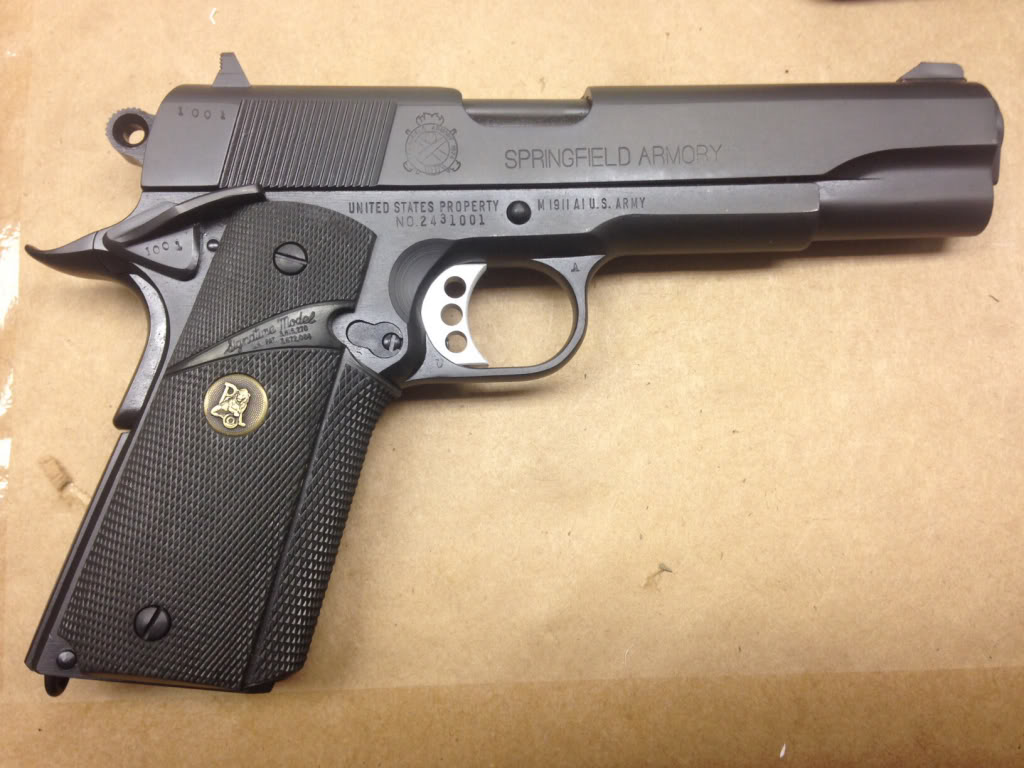
M1911A1

=== Out of service (obsolete) ===
- AAI QSPR (Quiet Special Purpose Revolver, .44 Magnum) (never issued)
- Beretta 92SB (9×19mm) (JSSAP winner)
- Browning Hi-Power (9×19mm) (Special Forces)
- Colt Dragoon Revolver (1st/2nd/3rd) (.44)
- Colt M1900 (.38 ACP) (never issued)
- Colt M1902 (.38 ACP) (never issued)
- Colt M1903 (.32 ACP) (General Officers)
- Colt M1905 (.45 ACP) (never issued)
- Colt M1908 (.380 ACP) (General Officers)
- Harpers Ferry Model 1805 (.54)
- High Standard HDM (.22 LR) (Navy SEALs and USMC Force Recon)
- Kimber ICQB (Interim Close Quarter Battle) (.45 ACP) (MARSOC)
- Misc. JSSAP/XM9/XM10 entrants (9×19mm) (never issued)
- LeMat Revolver (.41/.63, .35/.5)
- M15 General Officers (.45 ACP)
- M1799 flintlock pistol (.69)
- M1805 Harper's Ferry flintlock pistol (.54)
- M1816 flintlock pistol (.54)

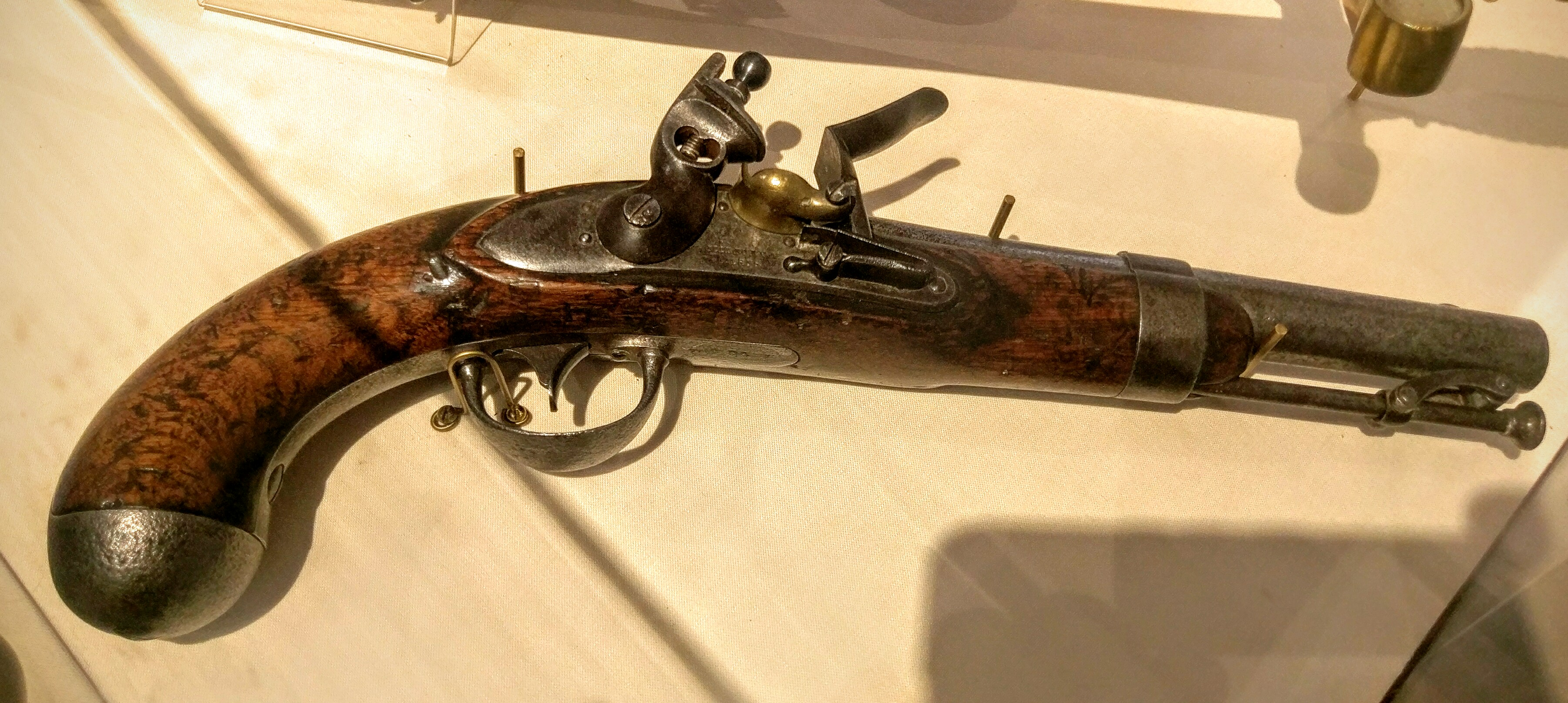
U.S. Model 1836 flintlock pistol, on display at Sutter's Fort

- M1836 flintlock pistol (.54)
- M1842 Navy (.54)
- M1842 Pistol (.54)
- M1847 Revolver (.44)
- M1848 Revolver (.44)
- M1849 Pocket Revolver (.31)
- M1851 Navy (.36)
- M1860 Army Revolver (.44)
- M1861 Navy Revolver (.36)
- M1873 (.45 Colt)
- M1889 Navy (.38 Long Colt)
- M1892/M1894/M1896 Army (.38 Long Colt)
- M1902 Revolver (.38 Long Colt)
- M1900 (DWM "American Eagle Luger"; 7.65×22mm, 9×19mm, .45 ACP) (never issued)
- M1903 Army (.38 Special/.38 Long Colt)
- M1905 Marine (.38 Long Colt)
- M1908 Army (.38 Special)
- M1909 Army (.45 Colt)
- M1917 (.45 ACP)
- Mk 1 Underwater Defense Gun (Mk 59 Mod 0) (Navy SEALs)
- Mk 22 Mod 0 (9×19mm Parabellum) (Special Forces)
- Objective Personal Defense Weapon (canceled)
- Remington-Beals Revolver (.36)
- Remington M1858 (.44)
- Remington M53 (.45 ACP) (never issued)
- Remington M1865/M1867 Navy (.50)
- Ruger MK II (.22 LR) (Navy SEALs)
- Savage Arms .45 pistol (.45 ACP) (never issued)
- Savage Figure Eight (.36)
- Schofield Model 3 (.45 Schofield)
- Smith & Wesson Model 10 (.38 Special)
- Smith & Wesson Model 12 (.38 Special)
- Smith & Wesson Model 15 (.38 Special) (USAF)
- Smith & Wesson No. 2 (.32)
- Spiller and Burr (.36)
- Starr Model 1863 (.44)
- Steyr Mannlicher M1894 (7.65×21mm) (never issued)

=== Canceled experiments and competitions ===
- Joint Combat Pistol and related (.45 ACP) (was suspended and later superseded by the XM17 Modular Handgun System competition)
- Colt OHWS (.45 ACP) (never issued)
- Colt SCAMP (.22 SCAMP) (never issued)
- Gyrojet handgun (13mm) (never issued)

== Less-lethal ==
=== In active service (some branches or limited roles) ===
- FN 303 semi-automatic less-lethal riot gun
- M37 MRCD (Mid-size Riot Control Disperser) compressed air weapon

=== Out of service (obsolete) ===
- M234 Riot Control Launcher

== Rifles ==
Includes muskets, musketoons, etc., as well as rifles

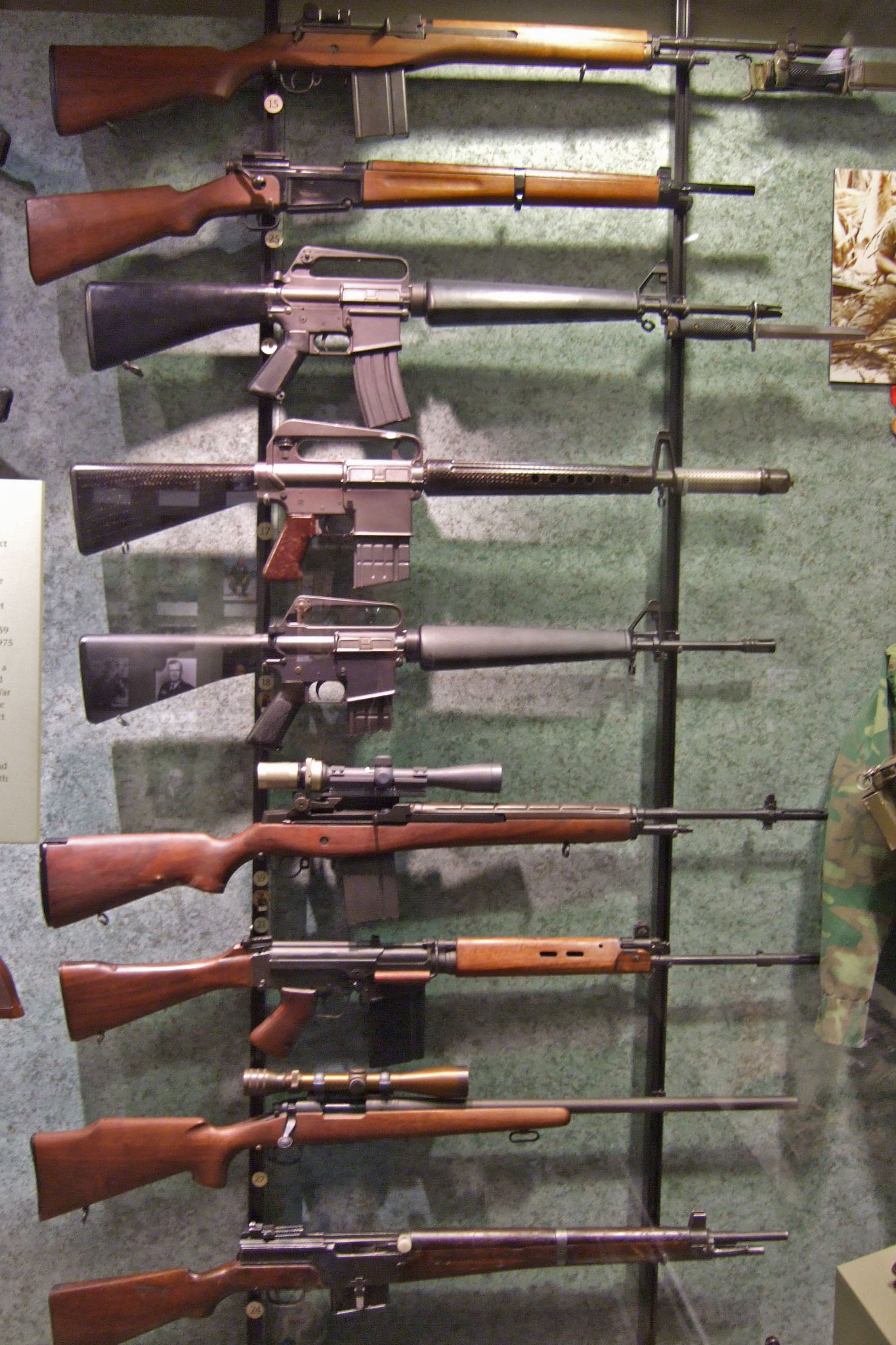
Weapons from Vietnam and Desert Storm at the National Firearms Museum.

=== In active service (some branches or limited roles) ===
- M7 (6.8×51mm Common Cartridge) (US Army)
- M16A4 (5.56×45mm NATO) (USMC, US Army)
- M27 IAR (Infantry Automatic Rifle) (5.56×45mm NATO) (USMC Automatic Rifleman)
- M38 SDMR (Squad Designated Marksman Rifle) (5.56×45mm NATO) (USMC Designated Marksmen)
- M110A1 SDMR (7.62×51mm NATO) (US Army Designated Marksmen)
- Mk 14 EBR (Enhanced Battle Rifle) (7.62×51mm NATO) (USCG, US Army, USAF Designated Marksmen/EOD)
- M39 Enhanced Marksman Rifle (7.62 NATO) (USMC Designated Marksmen/Scout Snipers)
- Mk 11 (KAC SR-25) (7.62×51mm NATO) (USMC, US Army, USAF, USCG, USSOCOM, USN SEALs)
- HK417 (7.62x51mm NATO) (Naval Special Warfare Development Group, USSOCOM)
- SIG Sauer 716 G2 (7.62×51mm NATO) (JSOC)
- Mk 17 Mod 0 (FN SCAR-H) (7.62×51mm NATO) (USSOCOM, USMC Automatic Rifleman)
- MRGG-S (Geissele Mark 1 Mod 0) (6.5 Creedmoor) (USSOCOM)
- MRGG-A (LMT MARS-H) (6.5 Creedmoor) (USSOCOM)
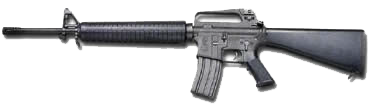
M16A2

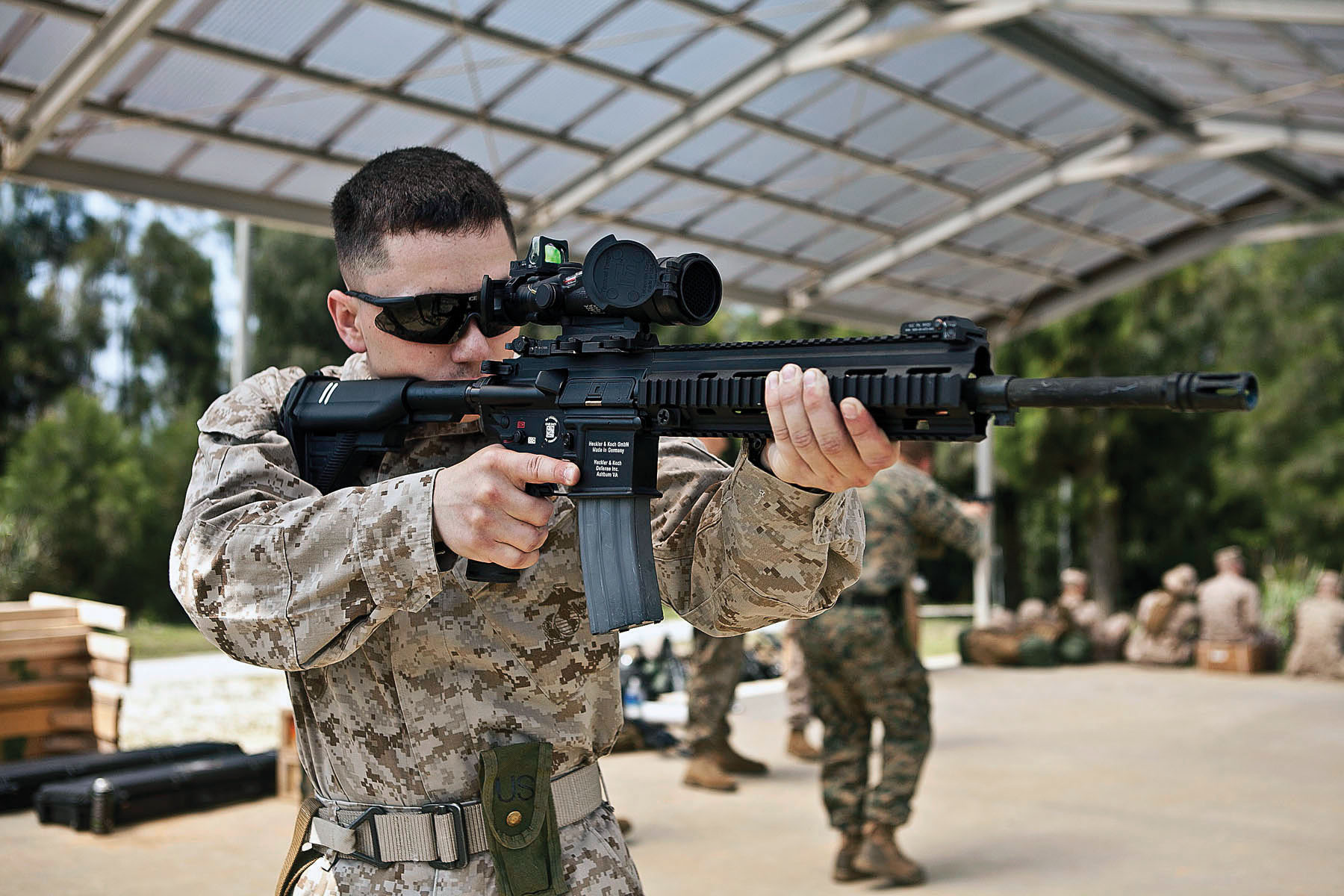
A U.S. Marine armed with an M27 IAR affixed with ACOG Squad Day Optic.

=== Out of service (obsolete) ===
==== Semi and fully automatic ====
- FN FAL (battle rifle, trialled as T48 against the T44 and T47 to replace the M1: lost to the former)
- Olin/Winchester Salvo Rifle (battle rifle, 5.56mm duplex)
- M14E1 (Selective Fire Rifle, 7.62×51mm NATO) (never standardized)
- M16A3 (5.56×45mm NATO) (Navy SEALs and USN Seabees)
- M16A2 (5.56×45mm NATO) (USAF, USCG, and US Army Training/Reserve/National Guard)
- M16A1 (5.56×45mm NATO)
- M16 (5.56×45mm NATO)
- XM16E1 (5.56×45mm NATO)
- M16A2 (5.56×45mm NATO) (USMC)
- Heckler & Koch HK33 (Selective Fire Rifle, 5.56×45mm NATO) (Used by the United States Navy Seals during the Vietnam War)
- Heckler & Koch G3 (7.62x51mm NATO Rifle) US Army Rangers in the mid-1970s and by the US Navy Seals from 1980. NSN 1005-12-140-9436
- Armalite/Colt Model 601/602 (5.56×45mm NATO rifle) (USAF and SOF use only)
- XM22/E1 Rifle (Selective Fire Rifle, 5.56×45mm NATO)
- Mk 4 Mod 0 (Suppressed Rifle, 5.56×45mm NATO)
- Misc. M1 Garand Variants (E1-E6 and E9-E14) (Semi-Automatic Rifle, .30-06)
- Mk 2 Mod 0/1/2 (Semi-Automatic Rifle, 7.62×51mm NATO)
- M1 Garand (Semi-automatic rifle, .30-06)
- M1941 Johnson rifle (Semi-Automatic Rifle, .30-06)
- Model 45A
- M1946 rifle (never used in active duty)
- M1947 Johnson auto carbine (Semi-Automatic Rifle, .30-06)
- Pedersen Rifle (.276) (competed unsuccessfully with M1 Garand to become primary service rifle)
- Pedersen Device (attachment for Springfield M1903, .30 conversion)
- M1918 BAR (.30-06)
- ArmaLite AR-18 (Trial purposes only)
- Mk 12 Mod 0/1 Special Purpose Rifle (5.56×45mm NATO) (US Navy, USMC, SOCOM)

==== Bolt action ====
- M1903/A1/A3 (Bolt-action rifle; .30-03, .30-06)
- M1917 Enfield (Bolt-action rifle)
- Model 1907/15 Berthier rifle (Bolt-action rifle)
- M1895 Navy (Navy Lee, 6 mm Navy)
- M1892/M1896/M1898 Rifle (a/k/a Krag Bolt Action Rifle; .30-40 Krag)
- M1885 Remington-Lee (Bolt-action rifle; .45-70 Gov)
- M1882 Short Rifle (.45-70 Gov.)
- M1882 Remington-Lee (Bolt-action rifle; .45-70 Gov.)
- M1879 Remington-Lee (Bolt-action rifle; .45-70 Gov.)
- Remington–Keene rifle (Bolt-action rifle; .45-70 Gov.)

==== Breech loading ====
- M1875 Officers' Rifle (.45-70 Gov.)
- M1873/M1879/M1880/M1884/M1888/M1889 Springfield (a/k/a Trapdoor Springfield;.45-70 Gov..: .45-55-405 & .45-70-500)
- M1872 Springfield (a/k/a Rolling Block Springfield; .50-70 Gov.)
- 1867 Rolling Block Remington .50-45 centerfire
- M1865/M1866/M1868/M1869/M1870 Springfield (a/k/a Trapdoor Springfield and Allin conversions; .50-70 Government)
- Sharps carbine/rifle (Breech-loader; .42-60-410) (.52 caliber issued to Berdan's 1st and 2nd US Sharpshooters in the US Civil War)
- Burnside Carbine (Breech loader, .54 Burnside, percussion lock) third most common Union cavalry carbine in the US Civil War

==== Lever action ====
- Henry rifle (Lever-action; .44-26-200)
- Spencer rifle (Lever-action; 56-56 (.52-45-350))

==== Rifled muskets ====
- M1863 Springfield
- M1861 Springfield (.58)
- Colt revolving rifle (Colt Model 1855; 6/5-shot revolver rifle;.44/.56)
- Greene rifle (Bolt-action breech-loader)
- P53 Enfield (.577)
- P51 Enfield Musketoon ("Artillery Carbine"; 24" barrel, .69)
- Model 1854 Lorenz rifle (Rifle-musket, .54, .58)
- M1859 Sharps ('New model 1859', breech loader; .52, .56)
- M1855 Rifle-Musket
- M1855 Rifle (Percussion muzzle-loader; 58-60-500)
- M1841 Rifle "Mississippi Rifle" (percussion muzzle-loader;.54, .58)
- M1819 Hall rifle (Harper's Ferry;Breech-loader)
- Model 1817 Rifle ('Common rifle';Derringer, Johnson, North and Starr; Flintlock rifle, .54) (later percussion)
- Model 1814 Common Rifle (Deringer, Johnson; Flintlock rifle; later percussion; .54)
- Harper's Ferry Model 1803 Rifle (Flintlock rifle; .54)
- 1792 contract rifle (Flintlock rifle; .49)
- Kentucky Rifle (Flintlock rifle)

==== Smoothbore muskets ====
- M1847 Musketoon (Springfield, .69)
- M1842 Musket (Percussion musket, .69)
- M1840 Musket (flintlock musket;.69)(later percussion)
- M1835 Springfield (flintlock musket; .69 cal)
- Model 1822 Musket (Flintlock Musket) .69 (later percussion)
- Model 1816 Musket (Flintlock musket; .69) (Later Percussion)
- Springfield Model 1812 Musket (Flintlock musket; .69)
- Model 1808 Contract Musket (Flintlock musket; .69)
- Model 1795 Musket (Flintlock musket; .69)
- Charleville musket (Flintlock musket; .69)
- Brown Bess (Musket; .75)
- Ferguson rifle (Flintlock breech-loader; .69)

=== Experimental ===
- NGSW-R (Next Generation Squad Weapon - Rifle) (6.8 Common Cartridge) -- Sig Sauer MCX Spear rifle and cartridge selected and ordered by US Army as the XM7 rifle and 6.8 Common Cartridge.
- MRGG-A (Mid-Range Gas Gun - Assaulter) (6.5mm Creedmoor) (USSOCOM)
- Mk 17 Mod 1 (FN SCAR-H) (6.5mm Creedmoor) (USSOCOM)
- LMT MARS-H 6.5 DMR (6.5mm Creedmoor) (USSOCOM)
- LaRue Tactical PredatOBR 6.5 Creedmoor (6.5mm Creedmoor) (USSOCOM)

=== Canceled experiments ===
- Textron CT System (Olin Winchester CT 6.8mm polymer-cased telescoped cartridge) (US Army) - not selected for NGSW program.
- General Dynamics RM277 (True Velocity .277 TVCM polymer-cased cartridge) (US Army) - not selected for NGSW program.
- Desert Tech MDRx (PCP Ammunition 6.8mm polymer case-metal cartridge) (US Army) - not selected for NGSW program
- LSAT rifle (not adopted, superseded by NGSW-R).
- FN-America HAMR (Federal Cartridge Company 6.8mm cartridge) (United States Marine Corps) - not selected for IAR program
- XM8 rifle - not adopted (5.56×45mm NATO)
- XM29 (5.56×45mm NATO and 20 mm airburst munition (XM1018)(early)/25 mm airburst munition) - program canceled
- Advanced Combat Rifle program entries (concluded 1991)
- Misc. Future Rifle Program entries (canceled)
- Special Purpose Individual Weapon (SPIW) program entries - concluded/canceled)

== Carbines ==
=== In active service ===
- M4A1 (5.56×45mm NATO)
- XM8 (6.8×51mm) (US Army)
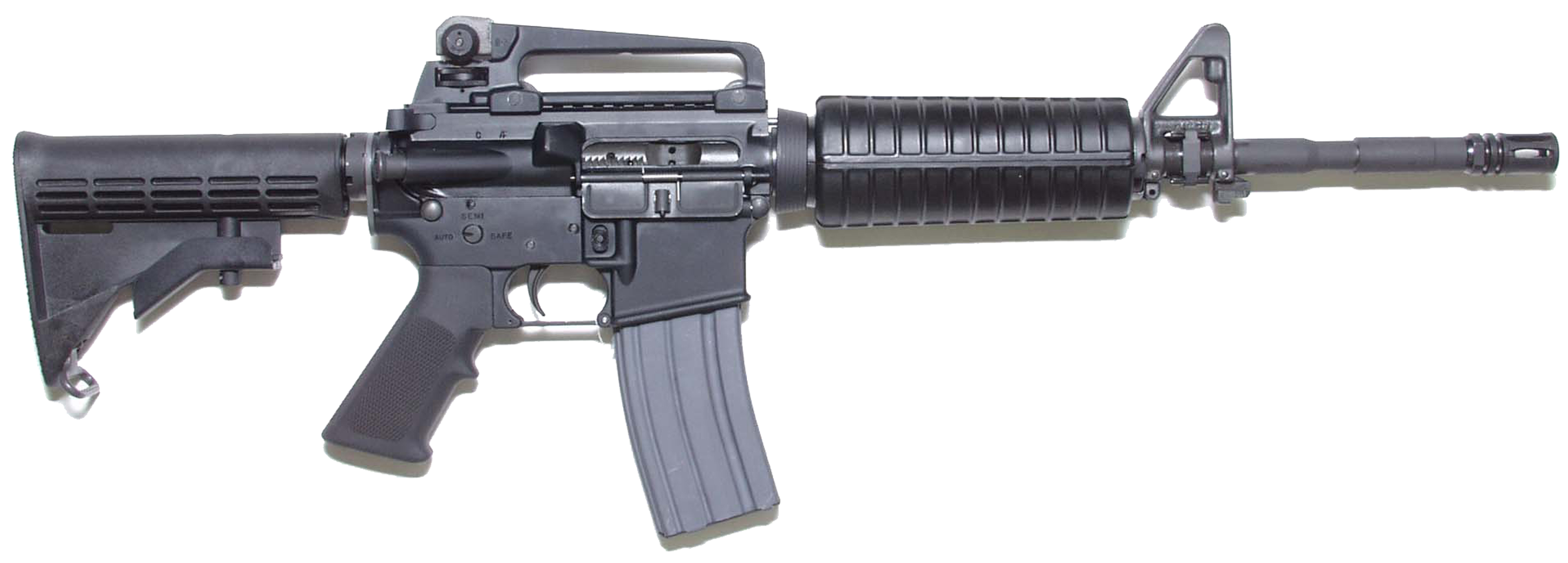
M4A1

=== In active service (some branches or limited roles) ===
- M4 (5.56×45mm NATO) (the U.S. Army was upgrading and retrofitting their existing stock of M4 carbines to the specifications of the M4A1, starting in 2014 and was predicted to be completed by 2020)
- Mk 16 Mod 0 (5.56×45mm NATO) (US Army Rangers)
- Mk 18 Mod 0 CQBR (Close Quarters Battle Receiver) (5.56×45mm NATO) (USMC Recon, USCG DSF, USN SEALs, USSOCOM, and USASOC)
- M231 FPW (Firing Port Weapon) (5.56×45mm NATO) (US Army Bradley M2A3 Crew)
- GAU-5A ASDW (Aircrew Self-Defence Weapon) (5.56×45mm NATO) (US Air Force)
- FN IWS (6.5x43mm NATO, .264 LICC) (USSOCOM)
- FN SCAR-L (CQC, STD)(5.56×45mm NATO) (US Army Rangers, USSOCOM)
- Heckler & Koch HK416 (5.56×45mm NATO) (JSOC)
- Low Visibility Assault Weapon (USSOCOM)
- Sig Sauer MCX Rattler (Reduced Signature Assault Rifle) (USSOCOM)
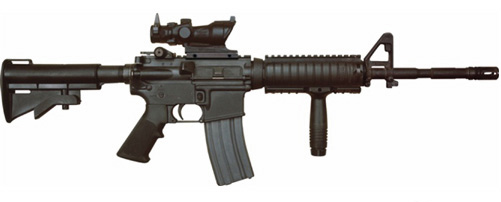
M4

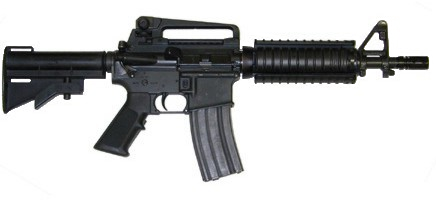
Mk 18 Mod 0 CQBR

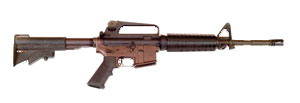
GUU-5/P

M231 FPW

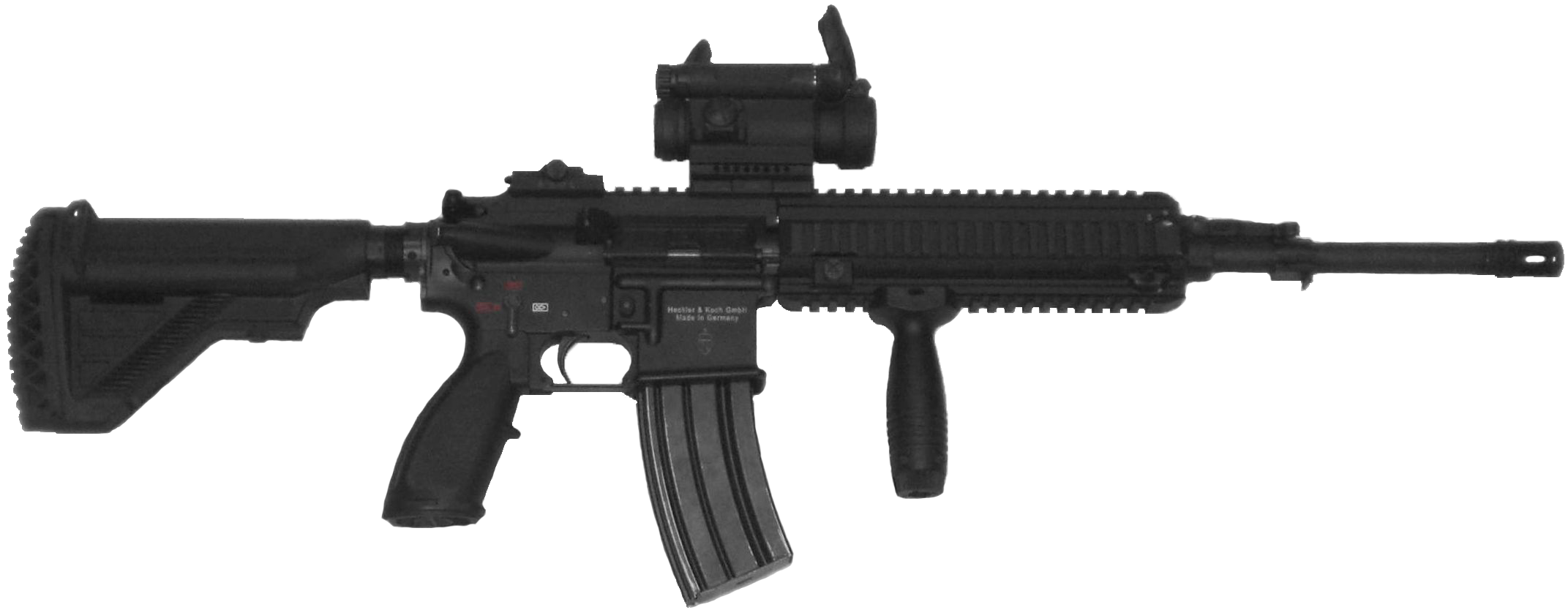
HK416

=== Out of service (obsolete) ===
- Colt Model 723 (Carbine version of M16A2, 5.56×45mm NATO) (US Navy)
- M4E2 Carbine (Automatic Carbine, 5.56×45mm NATO) (never standardized)
- CAR-15 Survival Rifle (5.56×45mm)
- Colt Model 653 (Carbine version of M16A1, 5.56×45mm NATO)
- GAU-5/A and A/A ("SMG," 5.56×45mm)
- XM177E1 and XM177E2 ("SMG," 5.56×45mm)
- Colt Model 733 (5.56×45mm NATO) (USMC Force Recon)
- XM23 Carbine (Selective Fire Carbine, 5.56×45mm NATO)
- GUU-4/P ("Arm Gun," .221 Remington Fireball)
- CAR-15 SMG (CAR-15 w/ 10" barrel, 5.56 mm)
- CAR-15 Carbine (M16 w/ 15" barrel, 5.56×45mm)
- AR-7 (.22 LR)
- M1/M1A1 Carbine (Semi-Automatic Carbine, .30 Carbine)
- M2 Carbine (Full-Automatic Carbine, .30 Carbine)
- M3 Carbine ( Infrared Scoped, Full-Automatic Carbine, .30 Carbine)
- Thompson Light Rifle (Full-Automatic Carbine, .30 Carbine)
- M50 Reising
- T38/M4 (Survival Rifle; .22 Hornet)
- T39/M6 (Survival Rifle; .22 Hornet/.410 Gauge)
- MA-1 (AR-5 Survival Rifle; .22 Hornet)
- M1892/M1896/M1898/M1899 Carbine (a/k/a Krag Bolt Action Carbine; .30-40 Krag)
- M1873/M1877/M1879/M1884/M1886 Carbine (.45-70 Gov.: .45-55-405 & .45-70-500)
- Smith carbine (Breech-loader (break-open); .50-50-360)
- Burnside carbine (Breech-loader, .58-60-500)
- Starr Carbine (Breech-loader, .54)
- Springfield Model 1863 (Breech-barrel carbine, .52-cal.)

=== Canceled experiments and competitions ===
- Individual Carbine (US Army)
- XM8 Compact Carbine (5.56×45mm) (never issued)

== Shotguns ==
=== In active service ===
- M500 (pump-action 12 Gauge)
- M590 (pump-action 12 Gauge)
- M590A1 (pump-action 12 Gauge)
- Saiga-12 (USCG, various U.S. Military Police units)
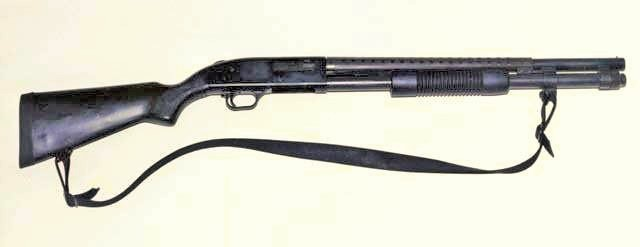
Mossberg 590 with 20-inch (510 mm) barrel

=== In active service (some branches or limited roles) ===
- M870 (pump-action 12 gauge) (USCG and USAF)
- M1014 (semi-automatic 12 gauge) (US Army and USMC)
- M26 (Modular Accessory Shotgun System) (bolt-action 12 gauge attachment) (US Army)
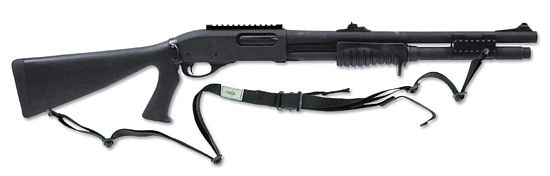
M870 MCS Modular Combat Shotgun

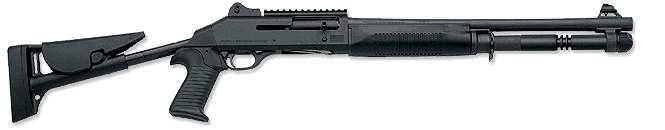
M1014

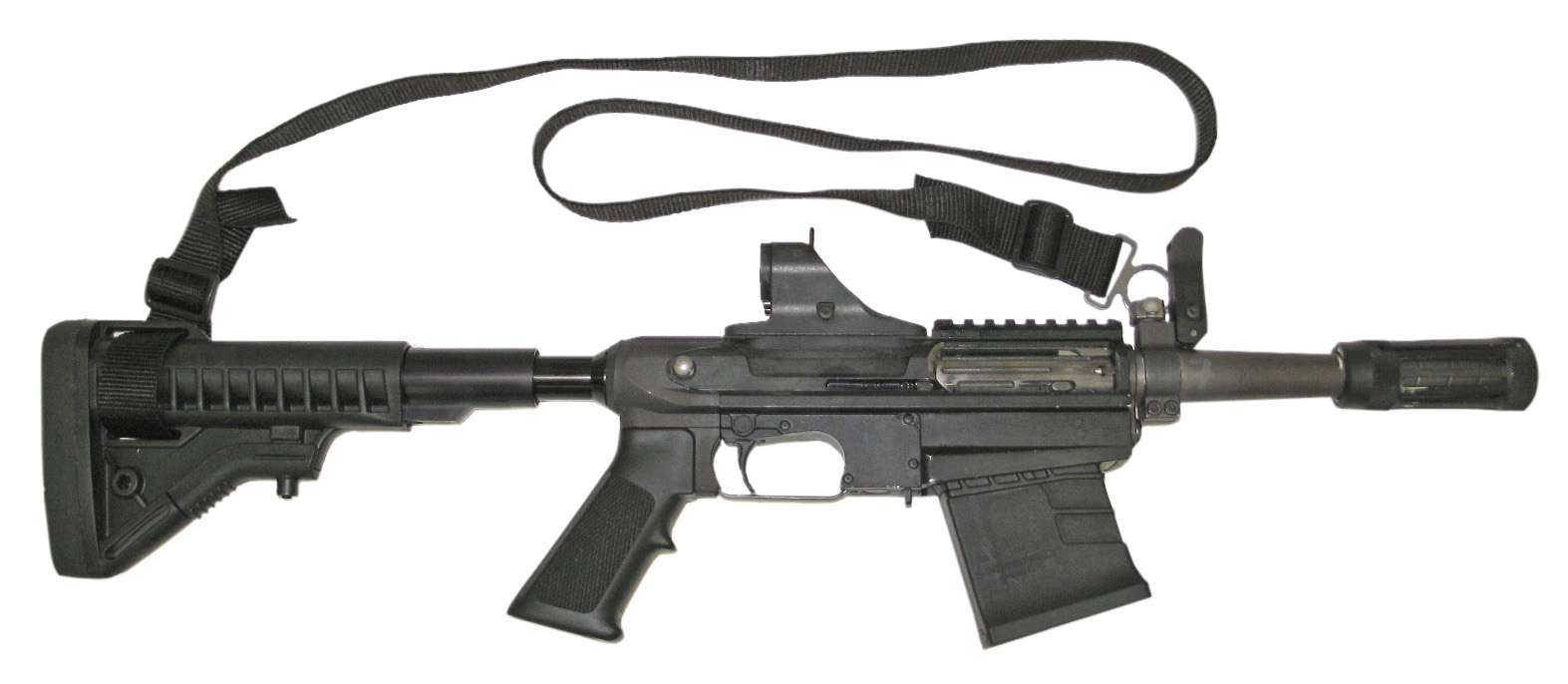
M26 MASS Modular Accessory Shotgun System

=== Out of service/Canceled ===
- Ithaca Model 37 (pump-action 12 gauge)
- Pancor Jackhammer (gas-operated 12 gauge)
- Remington 7188 (full-auto 12 gauge) (Navy SEALs)
- Remington Model 10 (pump-action 12 gauge)
- Remington Model 11 (semi-automatic 12 gauge)
- Remington Model 31 (pump-action 12 gauge)
- Springfield Model 1881 Forager (20 gauge)
- Stevens Model 520-30 (pump-action 12 gauge)
- Stevens Model 620 (pump-action 12 gauge)
- Winchester 1200 (pump-action 12 gauge)
- Winchester Model 1912 (pump-action 12 gauge)
- Winchester Model 1897 (pump-action 12 gauge)
- CAWS entrants, specifically HK CAWS

=== Experimental ===
- Maxwell Atchisson AA-12 (semi-automatic/Full-automatic 12 gauge) (USSOCOM, primarily USN SEALs)
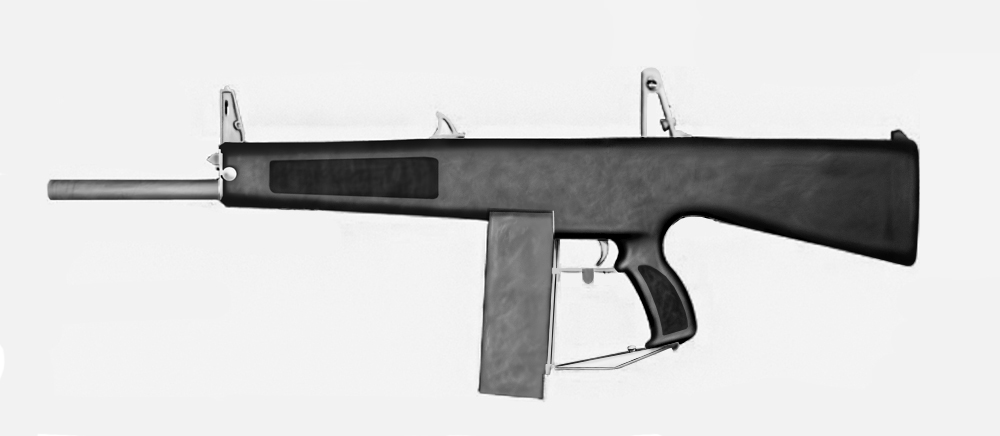
Maxwell Atchisson AA-12

== Submachine guns ==
=== In active service (some branches or limited roles) ===
- B&T APC9 Pro-K Sub Compact Weapon (SCW) (9×19mm) (Military Police, US Air Force)
- Heckler & Koch MP5-N/MP5K-N/MP5SD-N (9×19mm) (USSOCOM)
- Heckler & Koch MP7A1 (4.6×30mm) (DEVGRU, JSOC)
- SIG Sauer MPX (9×19mm) (US Army, JSOC)
- Colt RO635 SMG (9×19mm) (USMC)
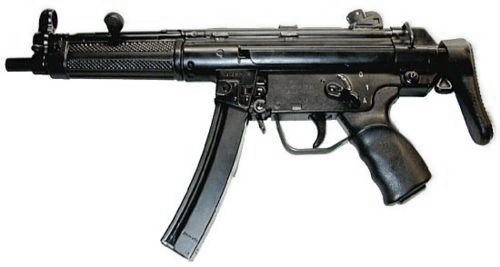
Heckler & Koch MP5

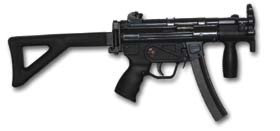
Heckler & Koch MP5K

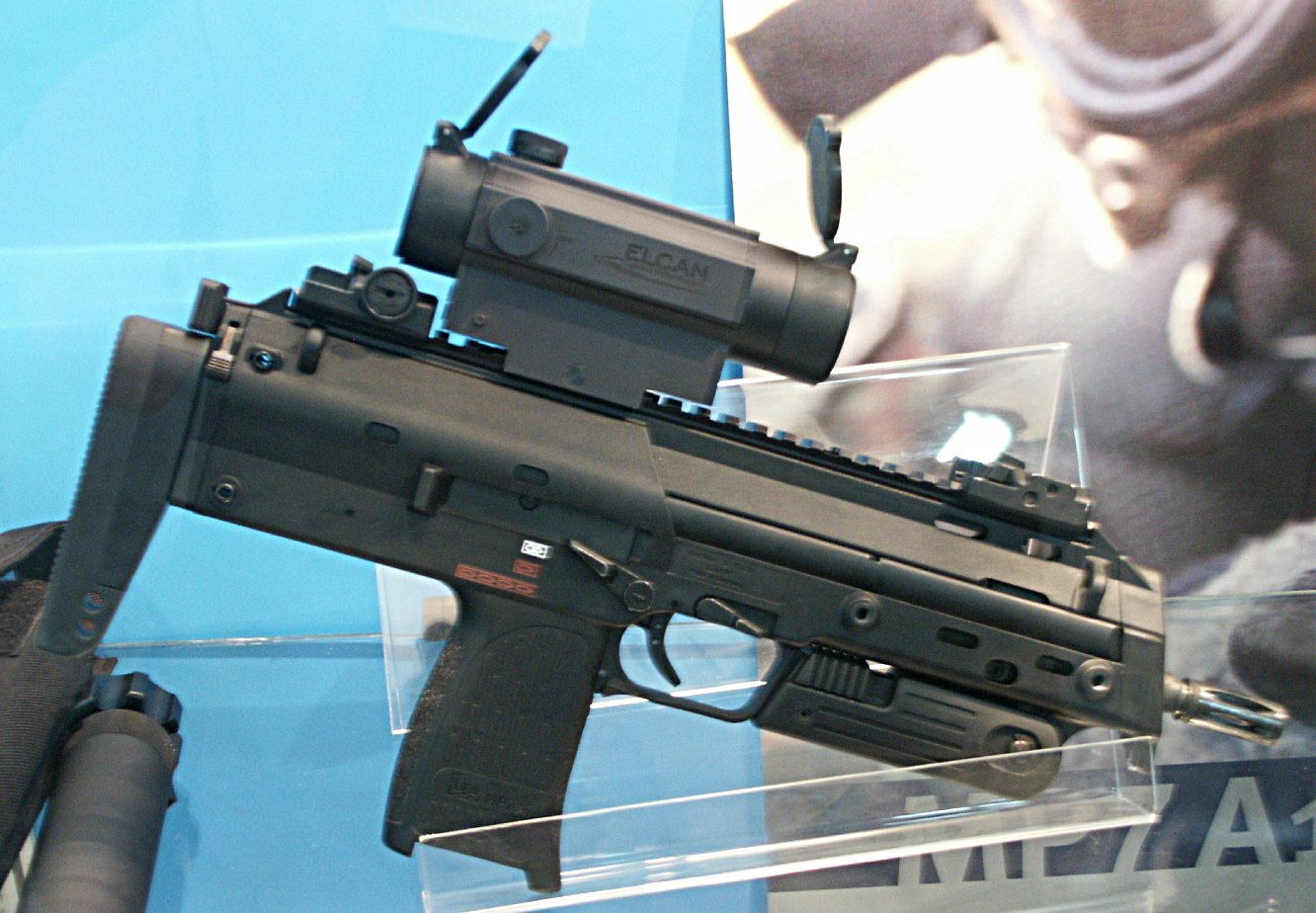
Heckler & Koch MP7A1

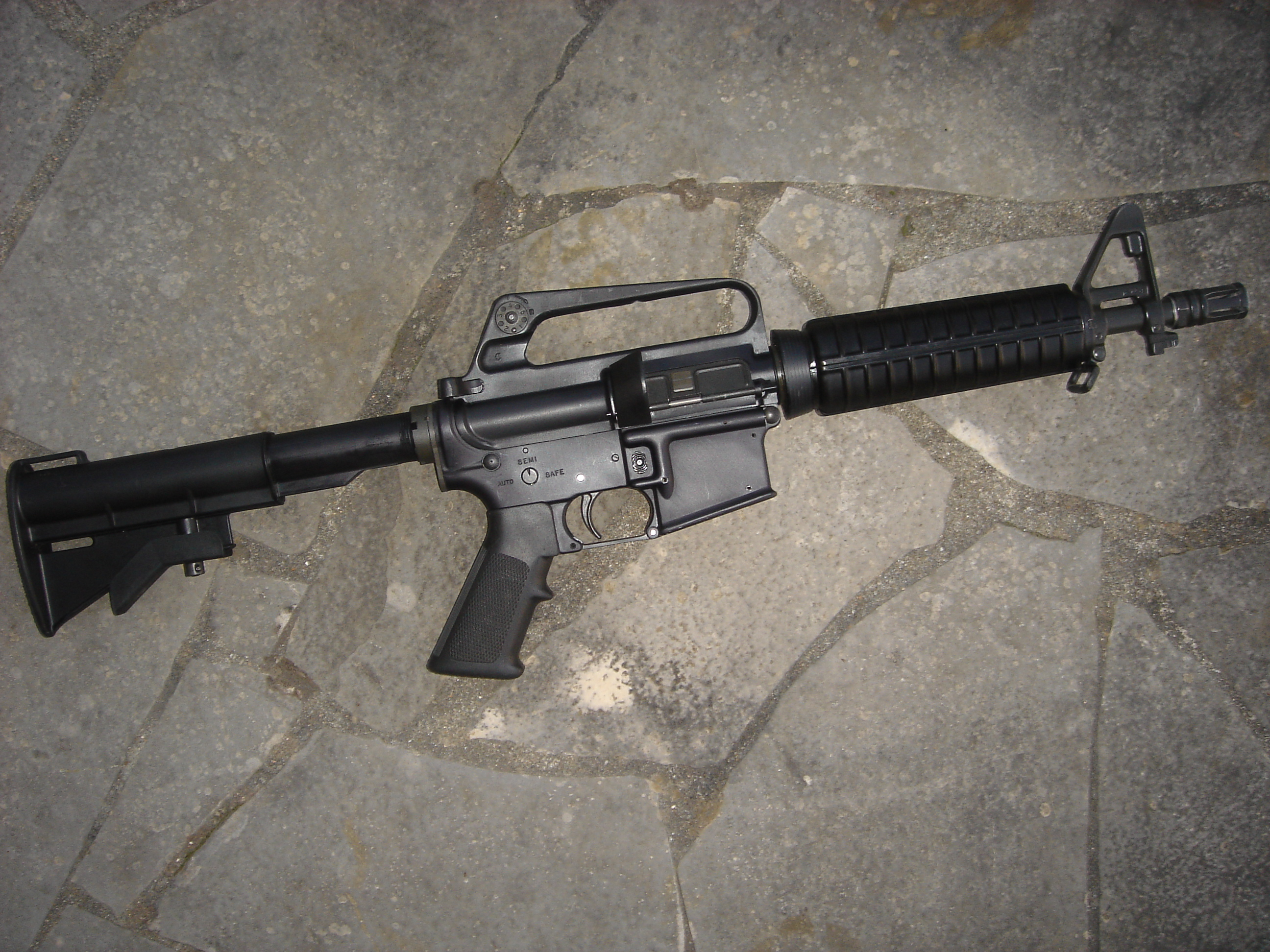
Colt RO635 9mm SMG

=== Out of service (obsolete) ===
- HK SMG II (9×19mm Parabellum) (never issued)
- HK 54A1 (9×19mm Parabellum) (never issued)
- HK MP2000 (9×19mm Parabellum) (never issued)
- M3/M3A1 Grease Gun (.45 ACP/9×19mm Parabellum)
- Madsen M50 (9×19mm Parabellum)
- Walther MPL/MPK (9×19mm Parabellum)
- Mk 24 Mod 0 (Smith & Wesson Model 76; 9×19mm Parabellum)
- Carl Gustav M/45 (9×19mm Parabellum)
- Model 50/55 Reising (.45 ACP)
- M2 submachine gun (Hyde-Inland M2, .45 ACP)
- M42 submachine gun (United Defense M42, .45 ACP/9×19mm Parabellum)
- M1/M1A1 Thompson (.45 ACP)
- M1928/M1928A1 Thompson (.45 ACP)
- M1921 Thompson (.45 ACP) (not type classified)
- Uzi/Mini Uzi (9×19mm Parabellum)

== Swords ==
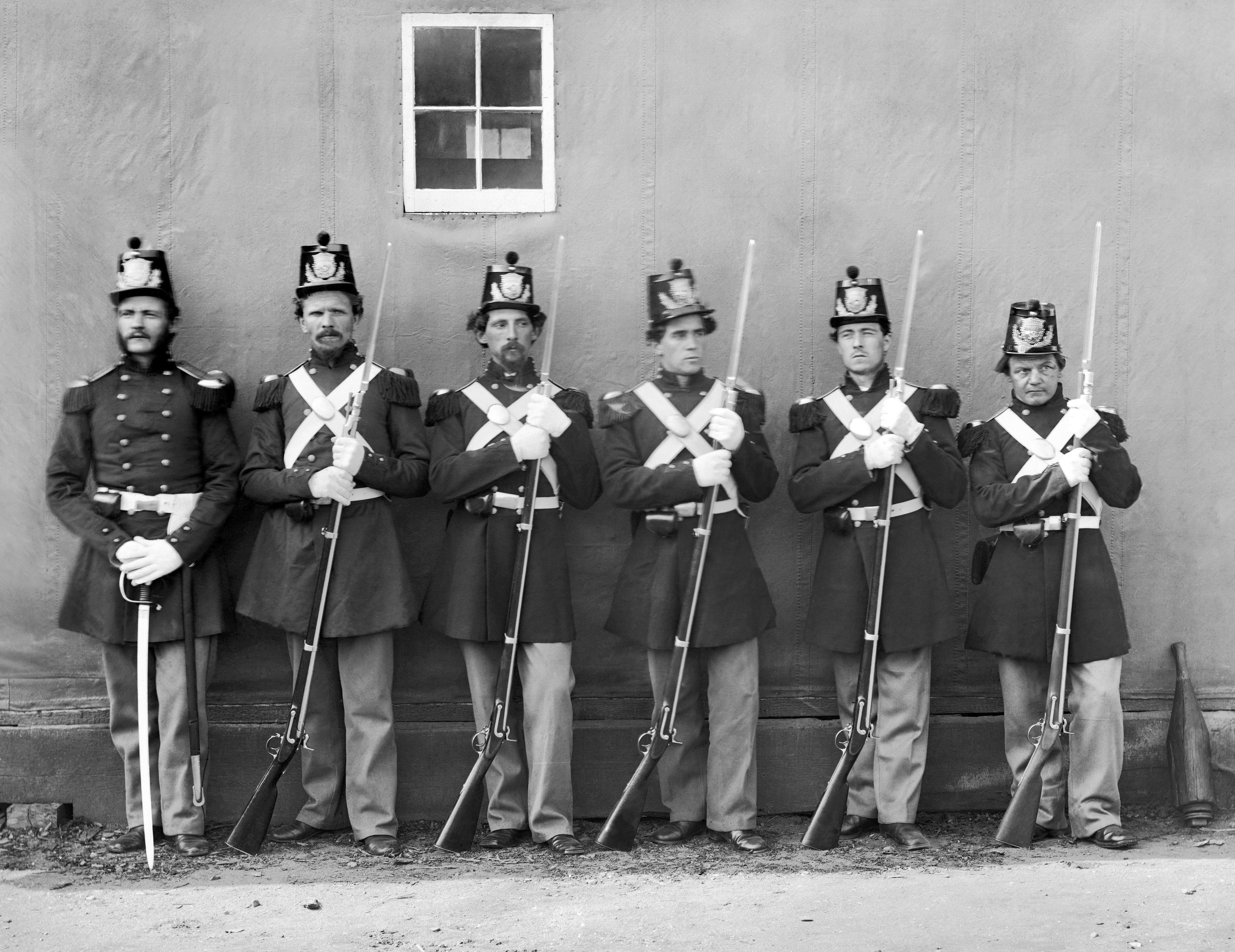
Five U.S. Marine Corps privates with fixed bayonets under the command of their noncommissioned officer, who displays his M1859 Marine NCO sword.

=== In active service ===
- Model 1840 army noncommissioned officers' sword, A modern version of this sword with steel scabbard is currently permitted for wear by US Army platoon sergeants and first sergeants; in practice it is rarely seen outside the 3rd Infantry Regiment and honor guards.
- Model 1852 Navy Officers' Sword
- Model 1860 Navy CPO Cutlass (authorized only for ranks of Chief to Master Chief)
- Model 1902 Army Officers' Sword
- Coast Guard Officers' Sword
- Marine Noncommissioned Officers' Sword, 1859–Present
- Marine Officers' Mameluke Sword, 1825–present (discontinued shortly from 1859 to 1875)
- Air Force Academy Cadets' Sword, c. 1955–present
- West Point Cadets' Sword, c. 1922–present

=== Out of service ===
- Model 1832 Foot Artillery Sword
- Model 1840 Light Artillery Saber
- Model 1872 Mounted Artillery Officers' Saber
- Model 1840 Army Musicians' Sword
- Model 1812/13 Starr Cavalry Saber
- Model 1818 Starr Cavalry Saber
- Model 1833 Dragoon Saber
- Model 1840 Heavy Cavalry Saber
- Model 1860 Light Cavalry Saber
- Model 1872 Light Cavalry Saber
- Model 1906 Light Cavalry Saber
- Model 1913 "Patton" Cavalry Saber
- Model 1832 Army Foot Officers' Sword
- Model 1832 Army General & Staff Officers' Sword
- Model 1832 Army Medical Staff Officers' Sword
- Model 1839 Army Topographical Engineer Officers' Sword
- Model 1840 Army Foot Officers' Sword
- Model 1840 Army General & Staff Officers' Sword
- Model 1840 Army Medical Staff Officers' Sword
- Model 1840 Army Pay Department Officers' Sword
- Model 1840 Army Engineer Officers' Sword
- Model 1850 Army Foot Officers' Sword
- Model 1850 Army Staff & Field Officers' Sword
- Model 1860 Army Field & Staff Officers' Sword
- Model 1872 Army Line & Staff Officers' Sword
- Model 1830 Navy Officers' Sword
- Model 1841 Navy Officers' Sword
- Model 1834 Revenue Cutter Service Officers' Sword
- Model 1870 Revenue Cutter Service Officers' Sword
- Model 1797 Starr Naval Cutlass
- Model 1808 Starr Naval Cutlass
- Mayweg & Nippes "Baltimore" Naval Cutlass, c. 1810
- Model 1816 Starr Naval Cutlass
- Model 1826 Starr Naval Cutlass
- Model 1841 Naval Cutlass
- Model 1861 Naval Cutlass
- Model 1917 Naval Cutlass
- Marine Noncommissioned Officers' Sword, c.1832–1859
- Marine Officers' Mameluke Sword, 1826–59
- West Point Cadets' Sword, Model 1872
- West Point Cadets' Sword, c. 1837

== See also ==
- List of crew-served weapons of the U.S. Armed Forces
- List of firearms
- List of U.S. Army weapons by supply catalog designation
- List of U.S. military vehicles by model number
