= WKC =

WKC may refer to:

- WKC Stahl- und Metallwarenfabrik of Solingen, Germany
- WKC (Baltimore), a Baltimore, Maryland AM radio station licensed from 1922 to 1923
- West Kent College
- West Kowloon Corridor, a highway in Kowloon, Hong Kong
- Weyersberg, Kirschbaum, and Cie of Solingen, Germany
- World Kendo Championship
- White Knight Chronicles
- Winston Knoll Collegiate
- Woodbridge Kart Club
- World Karate and Kick-Boxing Commission
