= Model 1852 Naval Officers Sword =

U.S. Navy Sword

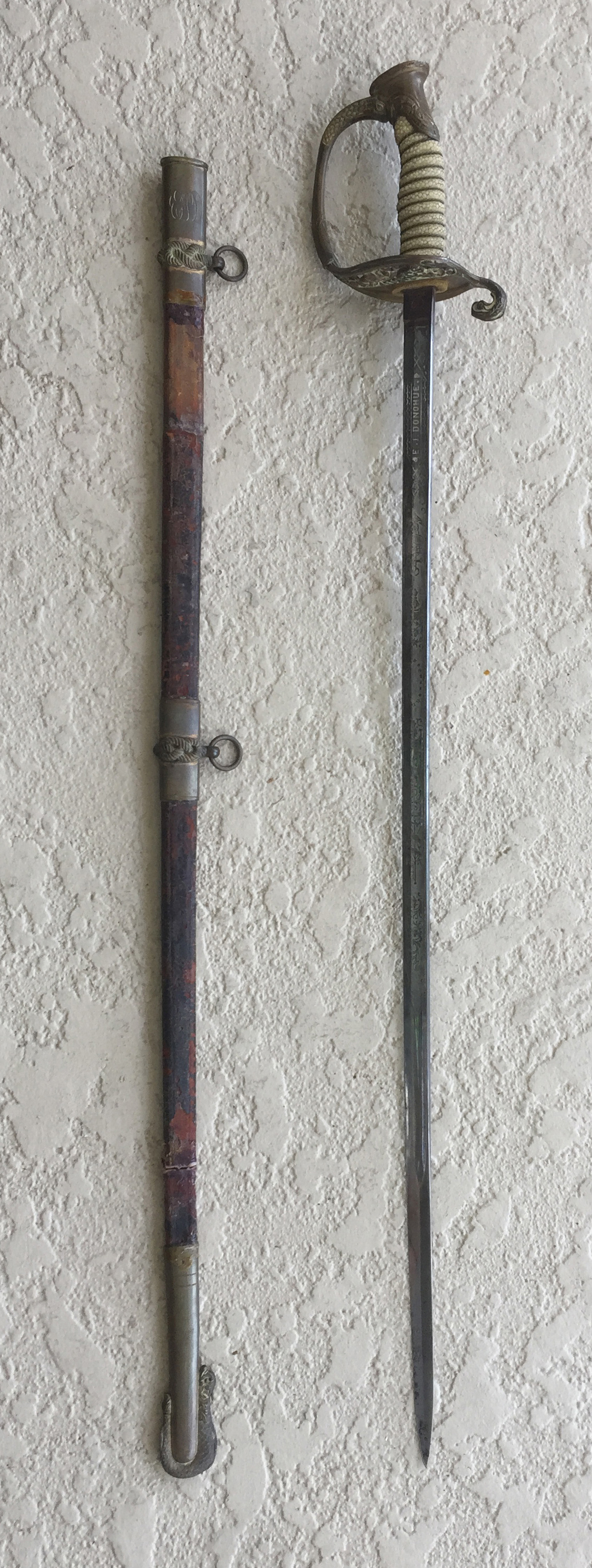
- United States Revenue Cutter Service Officer's Sword
- Type: Sabre
- Place of origin: United States

Service history
- Wars: American Civil War

The Model 1852 Naval Officers Sword was a sword produced for the United States Navy, which entered service in 1852 and was in use during the American Civil War.

== Design ==
Model 1852 swords produced before and during the American Civil War had a blade approximately 1 inch wide and were slightly curved.

By 1870 the blade width was reduced to about 3/4 of an inch and in the early 20th century the swords were made straight.

Both swords are manufactured by WKC Stahl und Metallwarenfabrik.

== Variants ==
=== Coast Guard Officers' Sword ===
The Coast Guard Officers' Sword, used by the United States Coast Guard, is almost identical to the Model 1852 Naval Officers Sword.

The only difference is that the Coast Guard Officers' Sword has US Coast Guard inscribed on it instead of US Navy.

It is of similar style as officer's sword used by the United States Revenue Cutter Service, the predecessor of the Coast Guard.

The sword was created in the aftermath of the first regulations on sidearms for military personnel. Previously, the swords used by the coast guard were either navy swords or a personal preference.

The requirement for US Navy officers to have swords was suspended during World War II.
