= West Point Cadets' Sword =

Formal sword of cadets at U.S. Military Academy

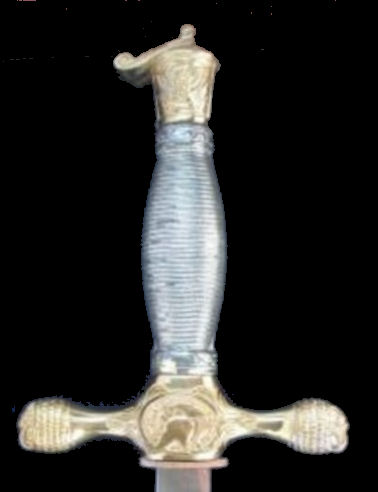
West Point Cadet Sword Model-1923

The West Point Cadets' Sword is issued to cadet officers of the United States Military Academy (USMA) at West Point, New York, for wear when the uniform is designated as "under arms," to include formal functions, drill, parades, inspections and graduation. The swords are issued to cadets in their First Class (4th) year, and are returned to the Academy upon separation, although Cadets have the option of buying their saber or purchasing a newly made one. Despite its straight blade and lack of a knuckle guard, it is referred to by USMA staff and cadets as a "saber," likely because the commands for its manual of arms utilize that term as the command of execution (e.g. "Draw...sabers!")

The Ames model 1850 seems to be the grandparent of this type of Academy sword. The Academy added specific heraldry to their sword starting in 1872. Other academies customized their swords, but now only 2 remain. The West Point-specific Cadet Sword is sold only to current cadets and alumni. The basic cadet sword might not be made from the same materials specified by the Academy and is sold without USMA heraldry, and can be purchased almost anywhere. The basic cadet sword has been or is made in Germany, India, Spain, and China, but not all swords are of the same quality. Variations of the sword are used at Virginia Military Institute and other military academies and schools worldwide.

The major differences between the two can be seen at left for the USMA blade and at right for the standard Academy sword. The blade etching can be seen in a photo below.

== Wear and mounting ==
In full dress or while under arms the sword and scabbard are worn mounted from a white cotton sword shoulder belt that is hung from the right shoulder to the left waist, and a red silk sash is worn round the waist. A breast plate is worn centered on the breast. This uniform is formal and is worn on parades and Honor Council Meetings by the color guard, Drum Major, Officer of the Day and Graduation.

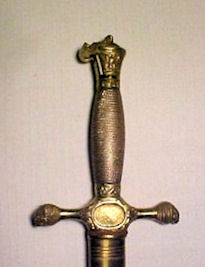
1959 M.S. Meyers Basic Sword.

The sword is also used for drills or less formal military formations, when it is worn on a black leather belt around the waist with a brass buckle bearing the academy arms.

In 1841, the superintendent of the Academy ordered that sashes were to be worn with the sword. US Army generals continued to wear silk sashes in full dress until 1917 when this practice ceased in the US Army, but it has continued at the Academy.

In 1955, Frederick P. Todd noted that today the West Point cadet officer is the only person in the Army who wears a sword and sash, and is the sole guardian of the tradition.

== Design ==
The sword is based on that used by the US Army when USMA was founded (16 March 1802). The first swords used were legacies from the Army following the formation of the Academy in 1802 and are believed to have been similar to the 1767 French Grenadier Sergeant's sword used in the Revolutionary Army. The first swords procured for the Academy were delivered in 1838.

== Custody and control ==
Swords used at USMA have copyrights and trademarks. They are controlled by the Directorate of Logistics, Cadet Services Division, Supply Branch and Service and Issue Center which now manages the maintenance of the swords, and their issue to qualified cadet officers.

The Academy Store manages the sale of swords to cadets, alumni members and other authorized Academy Store patrons.

Damaged and defective examples may be repaired or broken down and the components re-used.

Swords were ordered from the Springfield Armoury until 1920, after which they were subject to competitive procurement.

== Models ==
=== Model 1802 ===
These swords were issued to cadet officers and non-commissioned officers between 1802 and 1839. There are no known surviving examples.

Prior to the founding of the United States Military Academy in 1802, cadets served an apprenticeship in the field with the troops. After 1802, the only cadets covered by Army regulations were those at West Point. Army cadet swords before 1802 are mentioned in three existing sources:

On 30 March 1800, a General Order required cadets to wear a sword with a cut and thrust blade between 28 and 32 inches long and with a gilt hilt.

On 22 September 1800, the Superintendent of Military Stores, Samuel Hodgdon, wrote to John Harris, a military storekeeper, that cadet and noncommissioned officers' swords should be brass mounted with cut and thrust blade 30 inches long.

In 1801, a set of regulations was published stating that cadet swords should be the same as platoon officers' swords, 28-inch cut and thrust blade mounted according to the branch of service.

Most of the first cadets at the Military Academy were from artillery and engineer organizations, and so it is presumed that yellow mounted swords were almost universal. On 4 September 1816 a General Order specified that cadet swords were to be "cut and thrust, yellow mounted, with black grips, in a frog belt..." These specifications were repeated in the Regulations of 1820, 1821, and 1825.

There is no further mention of cadet swords in the Regulations until 1839, when it was stated that they were to be of the type worn by the Pay Department, which then carried gilt mounted small swords with black scabbards.

=== Model 1839 ===
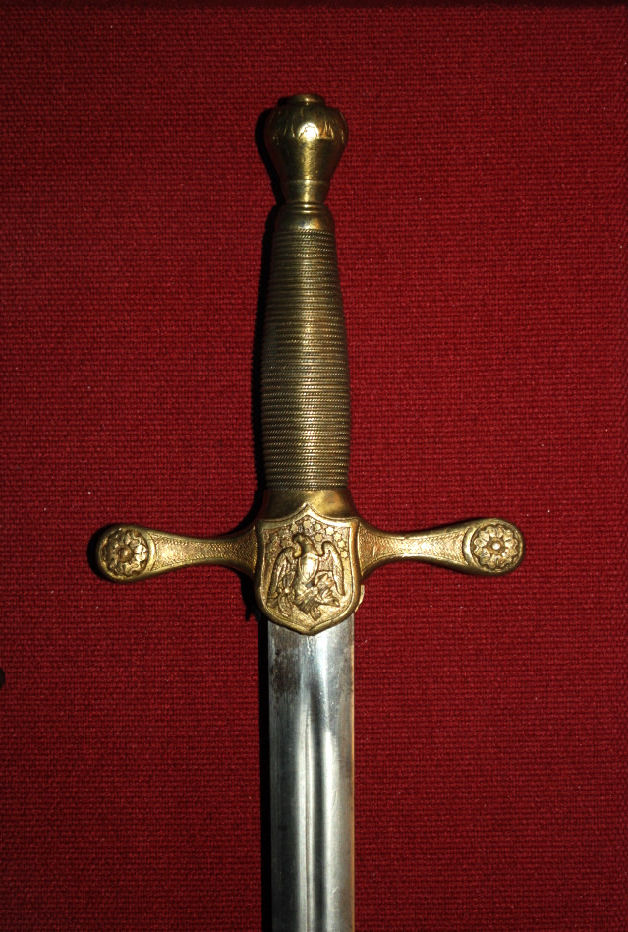
Model 1839 West Point Cadet Sword

The first distinctive West Point cadet sword appeared in late 1840. A small sword with straight cross quillon, shield shaped langets, wire wrapped grips and an urn pommel. This sword was made by the Ames Manufacturing Company, Chicopee, Massachusetts. It is believed that cadet swords were purchased by the Ordance Department for the U.S. Military Academy and V.M.I. In any event, cadet swords were inspected and die-stamped with the inspector's initials, the initials "US" and the year of acceptance. Hickox points out that V.M.I ordered the sword before the U.S. Military Academy did, and requested that the V.M.I. sword be marked appropriately, leaving the choice to N.P. Ames. Ames did not furnish cadet swords to the Academy prior to April 1840. The original order for 100 swords was not recorded. Hickox can only show 2 delivery dates to the Academy for cadet swords, 100 on 30 November 1849 for $11.00 each, and another 100 on 25 July 1856 for $10.00 each. Both orders were probably of the same pattern.

The regulations of 1839 are the last to mention cadet swords, when it was stated that cadets were to wear the swords worn by the Pay Department, a gilt-mounted small sword with a black scabbard.

=== Model 1850 ===
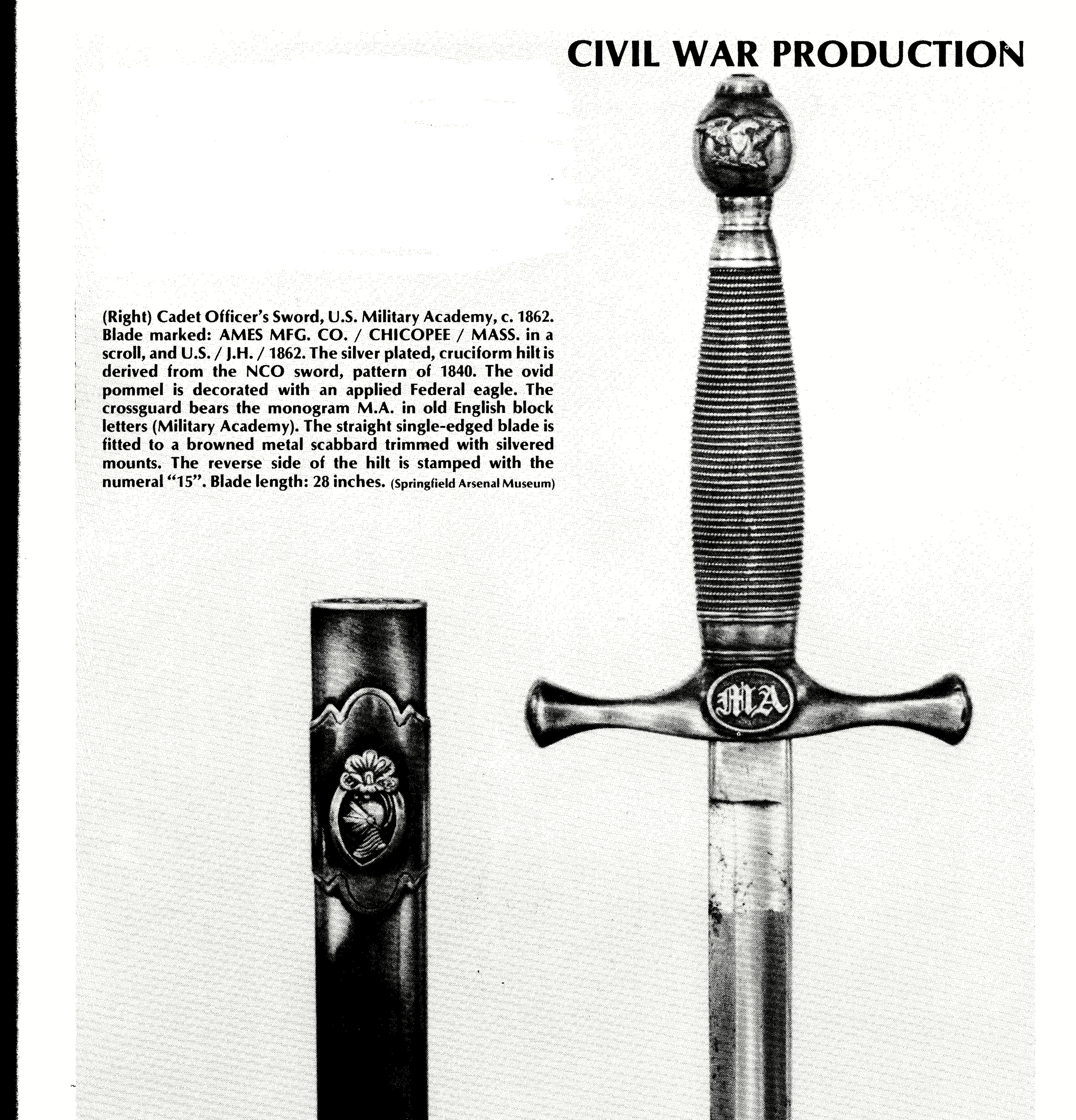
Model 1850 West Point Cadet Sword. Caption: Cadet Officer's sword, U.S. Military Academy, c. 1862. Blade marked: AMES MFG. CO. / CHICOPEE / MASS. in a scroll, and U.S. / J.H. / 1862. The silver-plated, cruciform hilt is derived from the NCO sword, pattern of 1840. The ovid pommel is decorated with an applied Federal eagle. The crossguard bears the monogram M.A. in old English block letters (Military Academy). The straight single-edged blade is fitted to a browned metal scabbard trimmed with silvered mounts. The reverse side of the hilt is stamped with the numeral "15". Blade length: 28 inches. (Springfield Arsenal Museum)

Little information is available concerning the precise pattern of the cadet swords ordered from the Ames Manufacturing Company by the U.S. Ordnance Department and few specimens have been located to date. It is believed that the cadet swords were purchased by the Ordnance Department for the U.S. Military Academy, West Point, New York, and the Virginia Military Institute (V.M.I.), Lexington. Cadet swords were inspected and die-stamped with the inspector's initials, 'US,' and the year of acceptance. This sword was also sold by Ames to other Academies and private buyers until 1923.

The following correspondence was sent by the Chief of Ordnance (Records Group 156), to either N.P. Ames or James T. Ames:

Ord Office
Aug. 10, 1849
James T. Ames,

Sir: I request that you will have made immediately, for use of the Corps of Cadets at the U.S. Military Academy at West Point, thirty swords. It is believed that you have the pattern on hand. If you are not quite certain, however, of it, you will request Capt. B.R. Alden Commdg. Corps of Cadets, to send you a sword as a model.

The price last paid for your cadet swords was $11. It is expected that you can afford to make these for less now. If so, I may be induced to extend the number to one hundred. Be pleased to let me hear from you. S/G. Talcott.

Ord. Office
Aug. 22, 1849
James T. Ames,

Sir: Your letter of the 20th inst. has been received and you will be pleased to furnish this department with one hundred cadet swords, at the price of ten dollars, stated by you, thirty of which to be completed and delivered at as early a time as practicable, being required for issue to the U.S. Corps of Cadets. S/G. Talcott

The 100 Cadet swords were delivered by the Ames firm on November 30, 1849.

The final Ordnance Department order for Ames-manufactured cadet swords is somewhat confusing, because the original order for 100 swords was not recorded.

Ames Regulation 543

The only letter found concerning the swords is:

Ord. Office
July 7, 1856
James T. Ames,

Sir: It was supposed from your letter of the 2nd May, last, that 100 Cadets' swords would have been delivered...they are much wanted, and I request that they be furnished at the earliest day practicable...S/G H.K. Craig

Ordnance Department records show that James T. Ames delivered the 100 Cadet swords, in addition to other swords, on July 25, 1856. The cadet swords were priced at $10.00 each, as specified in Col. Talcott's letter of August 22, 1849, and they are probably of the same pattern as the Model 1850 made in response to that letter. The Civil War caused a delay in delivery for 7 years.

=== Model 1872 ===
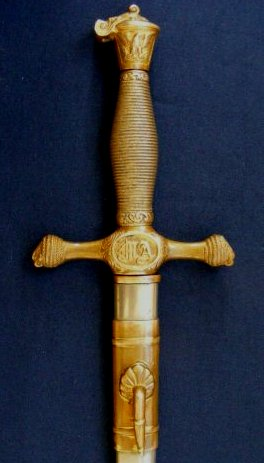
West Point Cadet Sword Model-1872 Maker unknown

The first pictorial evidence that can be found of the use of the sword is a photograph of a group of cadets from the class of 1875. It is known that this pattern was not used in 1870, but the exact date of the change between this model and the previous one has not been determined. In 1872 there were many other changes in the sword regulations for the Army, and so this has been tentatively selected as the date for the change in the West Point sword, although it actually could have occurred as early as 1871 or as late as 1875.

The straight blade is diamond-shaped in cross-section and tapers evenly to the point. It has a strong square ricasso, the obverse side of which is stamped "U.S. ARMORY/SPRINGFIELD." The grips are cast to resemble wire wrapping, and apparently the same mould was used as that for the 1840 non-commissioned officers' sword. There are ferrules decorated with floral scrolls at both ends of the grips. The pommel is an inverted section of a cone bearing an eagle with arrows and palms in low relief on both sides and a scroll at the top pierced for a sword knot. The guard consists of straight cross quillons with eagle head finials on both ends and an oval cartouch in the center of the obverse side which is surrounded by floral sprays and bears the letters "MA" in old English script. The entire hilt is cast brass. The scabbard is iron which may originally have been blued, but which is now bright. There are a throat with a stud for a frog and tip with an asymmetrical drag, both of brass.

There are several minor variations in this pattern. Some are made by private makers such as E&F Horster (Germany), Meyers, Rock Island, Ames, as well as the swords of the Springfield Armory, and are etched "U.S.M.A." in a cartouch on the obverse side of the blade.

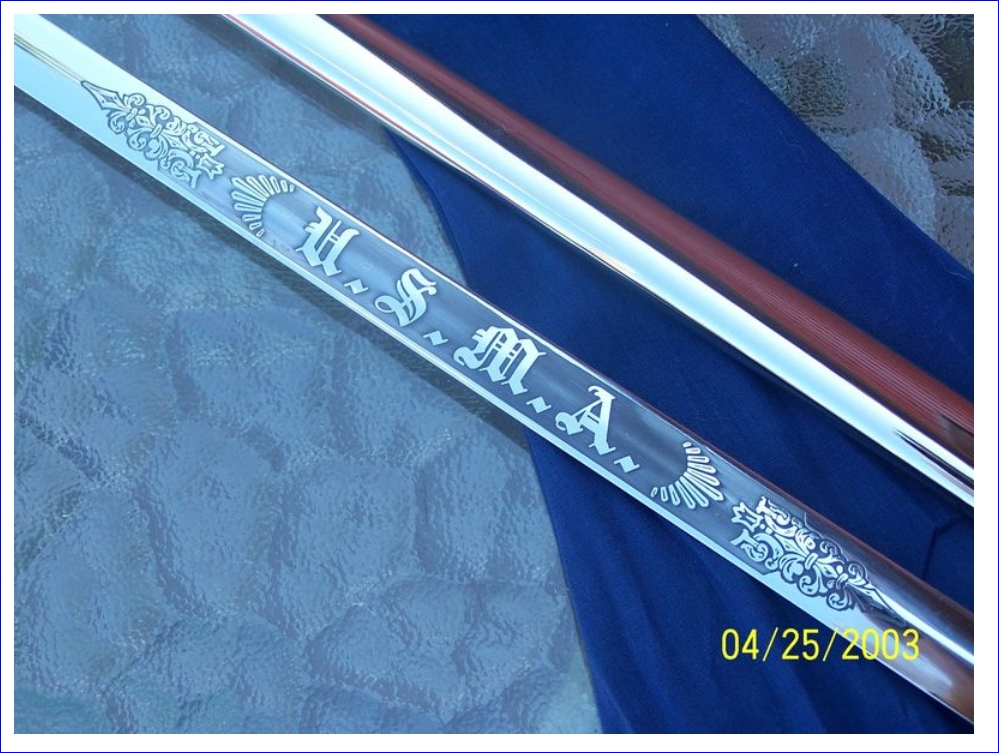
Model-1872 (maker unknown) to the present model-1922 have all had their blades marked in this way.

At one time there was an attempt to issue the plainer Armory products to the non-commissioned officers of the Cadet Regiment and the fancier models to the officers, but this was abandoned and the swords were then issued indiscriminately.

Adding to the confusion is a Frederck T. Chatman illustration dated 1885. It shows two cadets, the first in Summer and Full Dress, the other in White Fatigues. Both cadets' swords are well displayed and parts of the swords predate the first orders from 1872 with parts from a model 1839 issued sword.

A total of 253 swords were produced by the Springfield Armory between 1868 and 1914 with a subsequent order for scabbards in 1920.

Armory records show that between 1868 and 1920, the following numbers of swords were accepted:

- 1868 - 36
- 1874 - 25
- 1876 - 28
- 1880 - 14
- 1882 - 50
- 1893 - 50
- 1914 - 50
- Total - 253
- Plus 100 scabbards

The Supply Section at the Academy frequently uses parts from one sword to repair another, which is a source of considerable confusion. Peterson on page 181 shows a photograph of Cadet M.M. Kimmel, U.S.M.A., Class of 1857, with a sword of this type that postdates the model by 10 years, and Todd points to an illustration by Fredrick T. Chatman on page 60, dated 1885, showing cadets under arms carrying swords that predated the model by 20 years. The rebuilding of the swords continues today.

=== Model 1922 ===
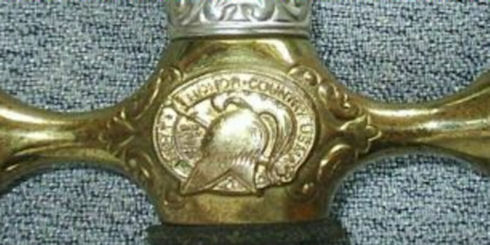
Closeup of the hilt bearing the Athenian helmet seal.

At some time after 1922, the West Point sword was modified to carry the seal of the Academy representing the Athenian helmet of Greek mythology, reflecting the adoption of this into the Academy's coat of arms, instead of the letters "MA" on its guard. The seal as adopted about the turn of the 20th century was designed with the classical helmet facing sinister (to the heraldic left or viewer's right). In 1922 it was pointed out that this was counter to the best heraldic usage which places the greater honor on the dexter side (the heraldic right or viewer's left). The helmet was then turned to face dexter. All swords bearing the crest that have been examined have had the helmet facing dexter. The earliest examples of these are well made with brass grips. The straight blade is double-edged with a wide central fuller on both sides running from the ricasso to within 8 inches of the point. It is etched on the obverse side of the blade "U.S.M.A." The hilt resembles that on the previous specimen except for the changes in the proportions of the elements, the use of white metal for the grips, and the use of the seal instead of the letters "MA" on the guard. The scabbard is exactly the same except that the body is chrome plated.

The current manufacturer is WKC Stahl- und Metallwarenfabrik in Solingen, Germany.

==== Future West Point Cadet Sword ====
A copy of USMA CSB-0146 Oct 2010 which is the new design can be found at the FedBizOpps.gov website .

=== Sabre ===
A sabre model was used at the Academy between 1839 and 1947 although for mounted drill rather than for ceremonial purposes.

== Private purchase ==
U.S.M.A. cadet swords are copyrighted by the Academy and are only sold at the Academy's cadet store. Any cadet or alumnus is at liberty to purchase a new sword for personal use.

== Past makers, distributors and exporters ==
- Ames Mfg. Co. Maker, distributors
- Ames, Lilley Company Maker, distributors
- Horstmann Company Philadelphia PA Maker, distributors
- M.C. Lilley & Company Maker, distributors
- V.H. Blackington, Maker, distributors
- Lilley-Ames Company of Columbus, Ohio Maker, distributors
- E.F Horster Solingen Germany, Maker
- Henderson-Ames Maker, distributors
- N.S. Meyer, Inc. N.Y.C. N.Y. distributors
- Gemsco Inc. New York distributors
- Hilborn Hamburger Inc. New York distributors
- Eickhorn Solingen Exported custom made swords to distributors
- WKC makes today's West Points Cadets Sword in Germany
- Marlow White is the present U.S. distributors to West Point for the cadet swords.

== See also ==
- United States Military Academy
- U.S. regulation swords
- Sash
- Shoulder belt (military)
