= WKC Stahl- und Metallwarenfabrik =

German sword manufacturing company

- Company type: Private (GmbH & Co. KG)
- Industry: Edged and bladed weapons
- Founded: 1883 (1955)
- Headquarters: Solingen, Germany
- Area served: Worldwide
- Number of employees: 34 (2023)
- Website: www.wkc-solingen.de/en

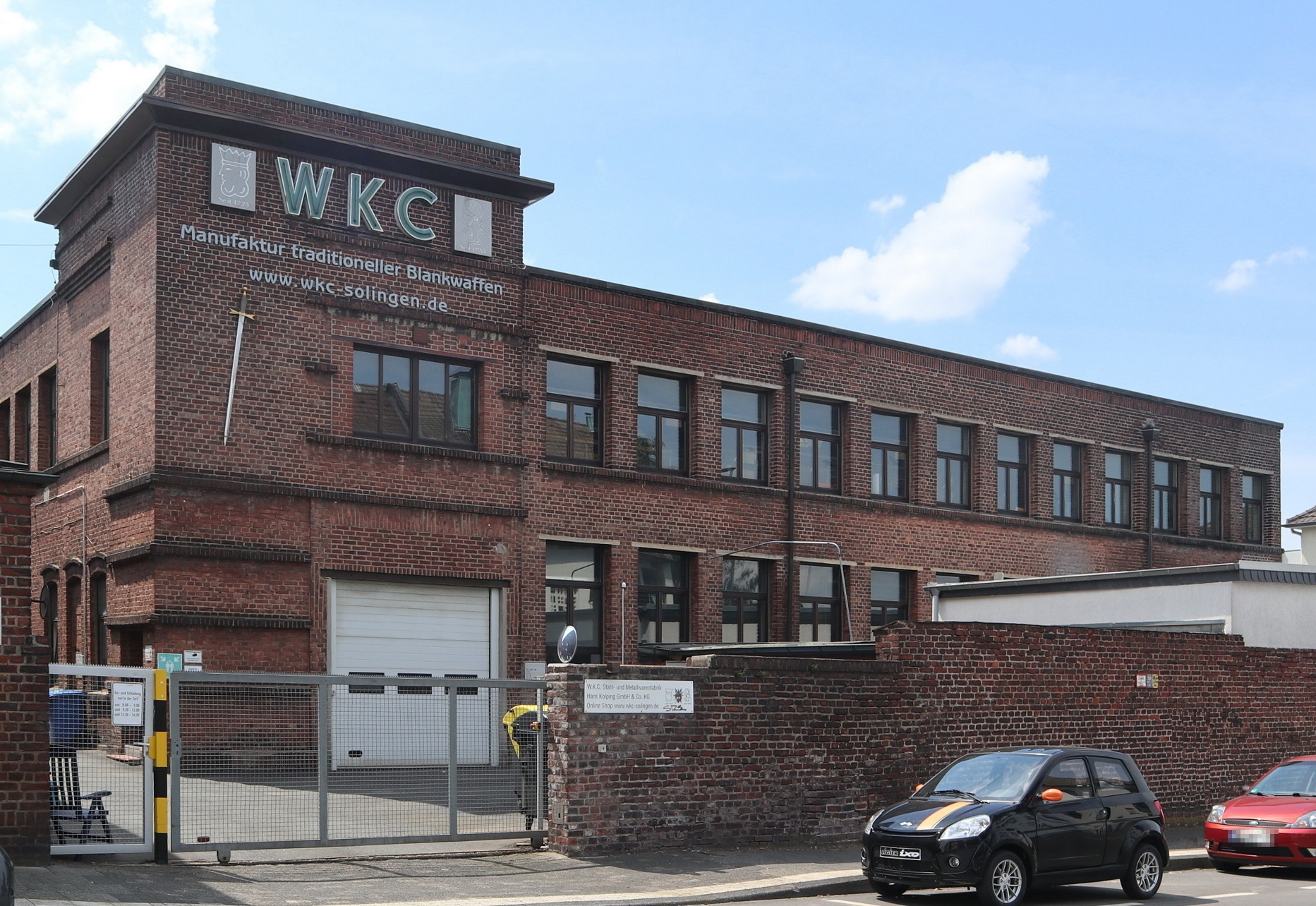
Building of the Company (2021)

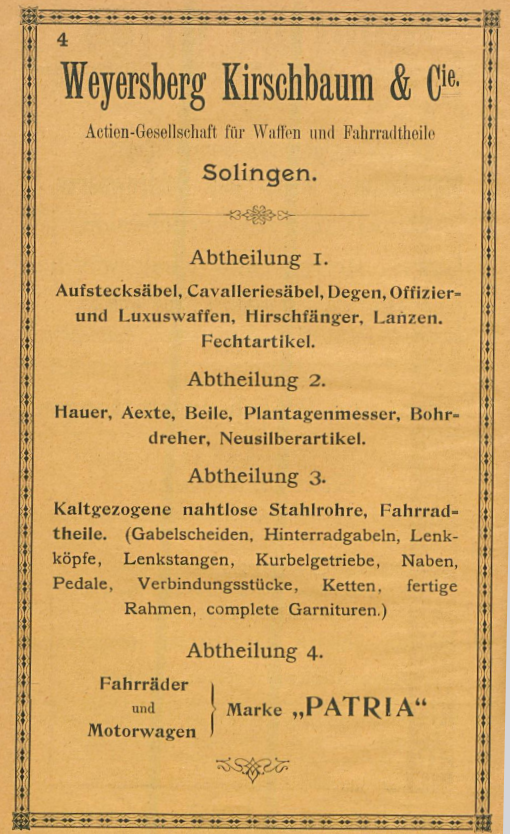
Advertising for WKC (1901)

Die WKC Stahl- und Metallwarenfabrik Hans Kolping (WKC Steel and Metal Goods Factory Hans Kolping) is a small enterprise based in Solingen, Germany, that manufactures and distributes Edged and bladed weapons. Since 1955, the current company has supplied various militaria enthusiasts, military academies, and police forces worldwide with ceremonial swords and other edged weapons. The current company originated from the Weyersberg, Kirschbaum & Cie. (WKC) and, according to its own statement, is therefore the oldest manufacturing company producing Edged and bladed weapons in the world. In the 1880s, WKC was one of the largest edged weapon manufacturers in the German Empire. The administrative buildings at the company's former site are now part of Solingen City Hall and have been listed as a historical monument in Solingen since 1991.

== History ==
In 1774, the so called king's head mark, which is still present in the WKC logo today, was sold by the descendants of the renowned Solingen bladesmith Johannes Wundes, who had registered it in the guild's register of marks in 1584, to Peter Weyersberg. In 1787, he founded the company Gebr. Weyersberg (Broth. Weyersberg) together with his brothers Wilhelm and Johann Ludwig. The company W. R. Kirschbaum, founded by Wilhelm Reinhardt Kirschbaum, was established in 1854. Both companies were considered pioneers in the mechanization of Solingen arms manufacturing in the second half of the 19th century, for which machines were imported from England, enabling the industrial production of swords. This led to considerable protests among the Solingen sword smiths who still worked by hand at that time. In 1883, the two large family-run Solingen sword-making firms, Weyersberg and Kirschbaum, merged to form Weyersberg, Kirschbaum & Cie. (WKC).

By 1900, WKC had 630 employees. The company had numerous national and international customers, producing, for example, the M.61 infantry officer's saber for the Austro-Hungarian army (the Common Army in particular). However, to reduce its dependence on arms manufacturing, the company expanded its portfolio from the 1880s onwards to include hair clippers, typewriters, axes, and machetes. The Mars and Norma hair clippers, in particular, proved to be sales successes. Bicycles, motorcycles, and bicycle parts were produced and sold under its own Patria brand. The bicycle business accounted for approximately 35 percent of total sales in the 1904/1905 fiscal year. In the 1920s, with its Patria WKC brand, it was the tenth largest bicycle manufacturer in Germany.

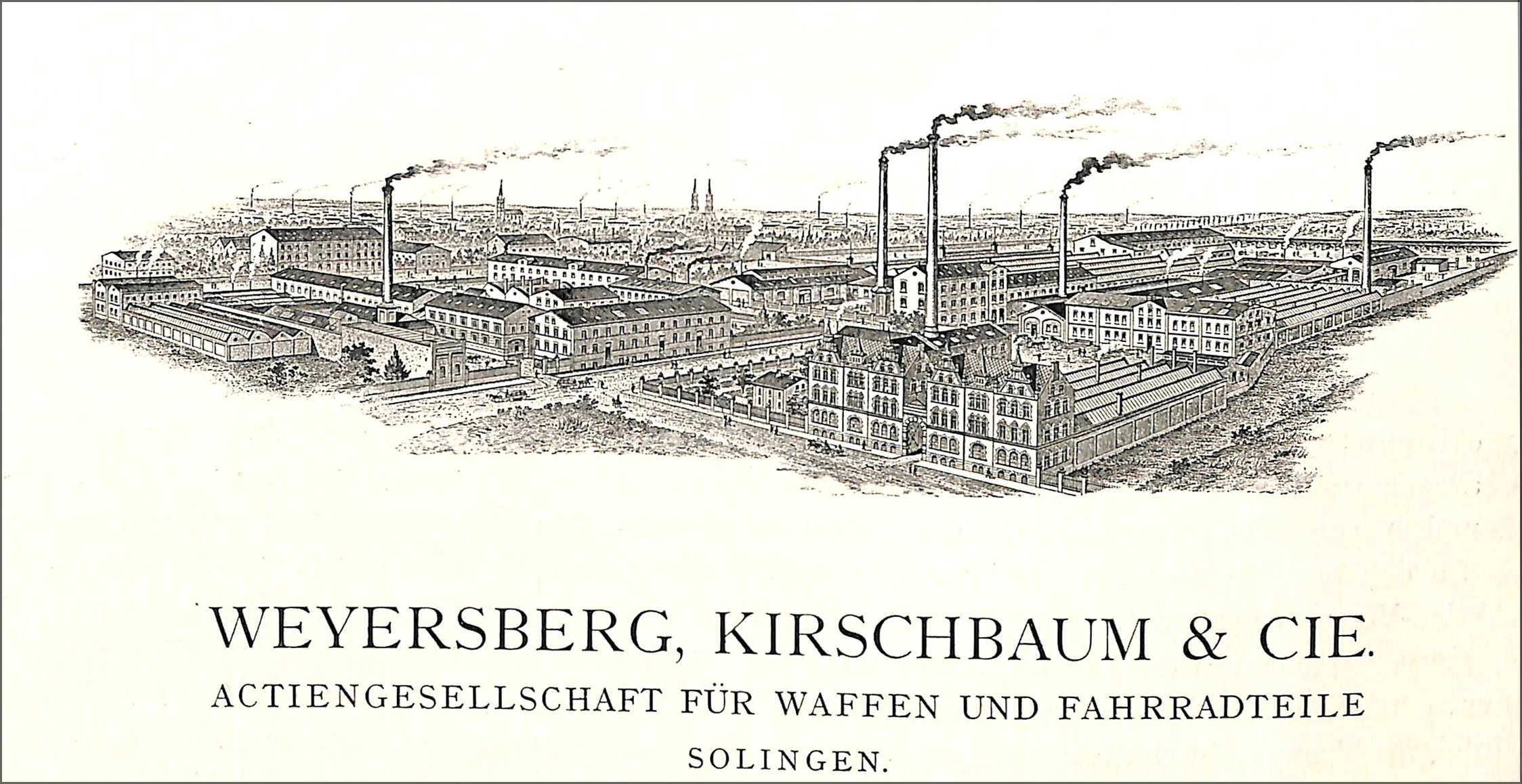
(Fictional) view of Weyersberg, Kirschbaum & Cie. AG, created by Wilhelm Wendlandt. (1913)

In 1922, WKC was acquired by a former supplier (Siegen-Solinger Gussstahl-Aktien-Verein). The company flourished until the Great Depression of the 1920s due to the growing bicycle market. By 1927, three million bicycles had been produced. After the bankruptcy of the Siegen-Solinger Gussstahl-Aktien-Verein in 1932, WKC was divided into independent business units and continued to operate. During World War II, as a supplier to the Wehrmacht and SS, the company became a target of Allied bombing raids. During the air raids on Solingen in November 1944, the factory on Cronenberger Str. was almost completely destroyed. Only the administrative buildings, which have been used by the city of Solingen as the town hall since 1937, and the former pipe-drawing mill on Wittkuller Str., where the company is still headquartered today, survived.

In 1935, the company—like other Solingen manufacturers—received an RZM code. These approval numbers were also issued during the Nazi era for the production of military bladed weapons worn with Nazi uniforms. The company thus produced, among other things, bayonets and officers' daggers for the Wehrmacht, as well as approximately 5,000 service daggers for the Sturmabteilung. Furthermore, the company was among the licensed manufacturers of Hitler Youth (HJ) hunting knives.

In 1955, the Solingen knifemaker Hans Kolping bought the company's weapons division. He restarted operations and once again had ceremonial swords and daggers, knives, and pistols manufactured. Soon afterward, he discontinued pistol production and concentrated on the manufacture of edged weapons. For this purpose, the company built its own blade etching shop. The first orders at this time came from the United States Navy and the United States Marine Corps. From 1968, the company was among the manufacturers of the newly introduced Bundeswehr combat knife.

Hans Kolping died in 1989, leaving the company to his partner, Margard Willms. Shortly afterwards, their son, Joachim Willms, took over and invested heavily in buildings and equipment. In 1995, André Willms, the current managing director, joined the company.

In November 2005 the Wilkinson Sword factory in London closed. To ensure the continued production of British ceremonial swords, Wilkinson put its assets up for sale in a closed bidding process. WKC participated and acquired the majority of Wilkinson's tooling, spare parts, and rolling mill. These were transported to Germany and integrated into WKC's production. This enabled the company to manufacture a wider variety of sword types and supply more countries. The company also produces Japanese katanas using traditional hand-forging techniques. Customers include the United States Military Academy (West Point Cadets' Sword).

== WKC-Building and new town hall ==
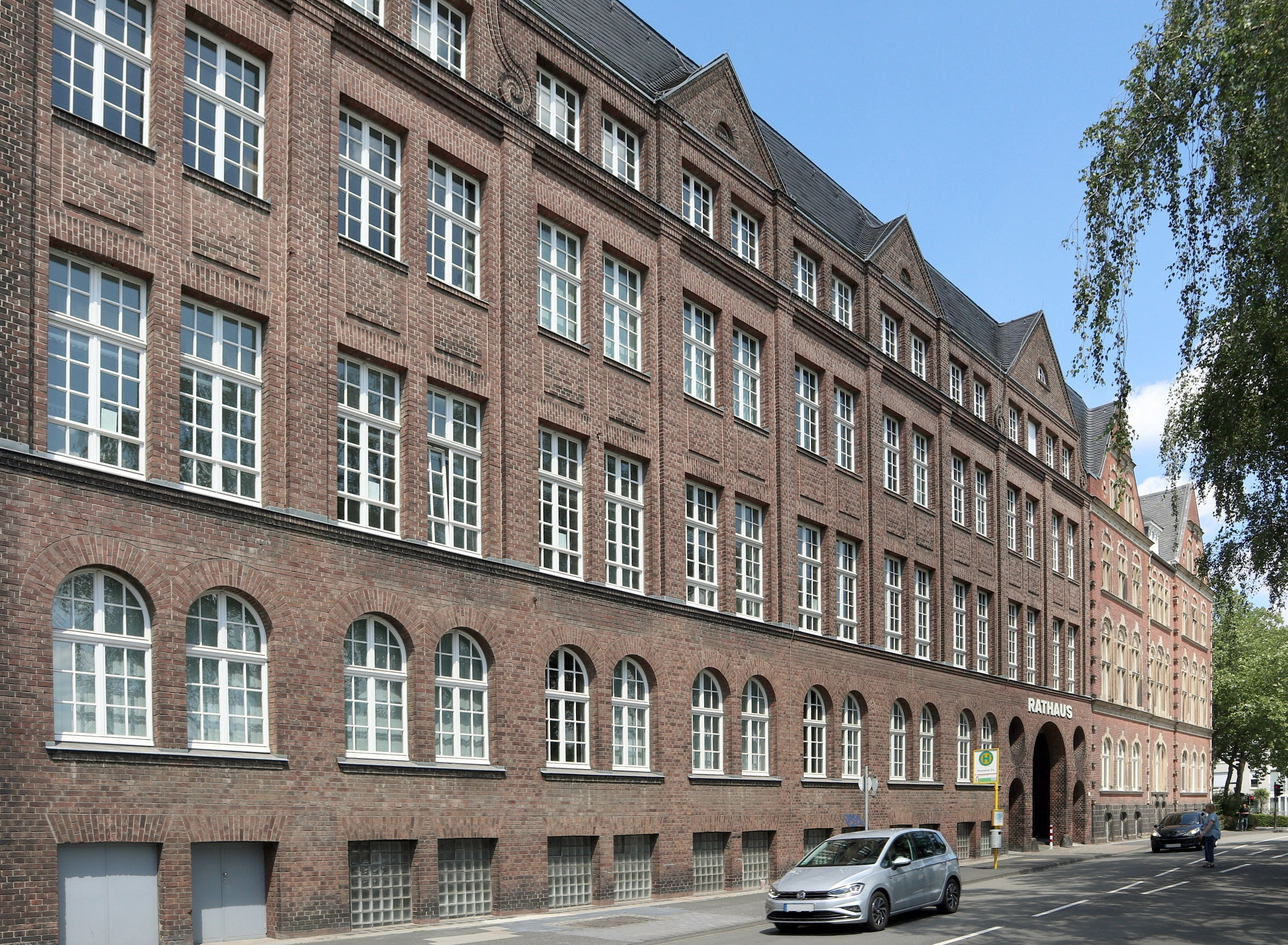
Former WKC buildings in Solingen-Mitte, now part of the town hall

Until 1929, the WKC company's administration was located in several brick buildings at Cronenberger Str. 59/61 in Solingen. From 1937 onwards, these buildings were used by the city administration, but retained the name "WKC Buildings". In 2008, a new town hall was built, into which the old, listed buildings were integrated. An exhibition in the foyer of the new town hall commemorated the WKC company, but this was dismantled in November 2010 to make way for future art exhibitions. However, a WKC advertising poster from 1900 by the Solingen artist Robert Engels can still be seen in the faithfully preserved stairwell of the oldest part of the building, dating from 1898. Together with the WKC company logo, the armor, in the wrought-iron stair railing, it serves as a reminder of the building's past.

== Literature ==
- Johannes Großewinkelmann: Station 5: WKC Stahl- und Metallwarenfabrik, Wittkuller Straße 140. In: Wald – vom Gewerbedorf zum Industriestandort, Hrsg.: Landschaftsverband Rheinland (= Wanderwege zur Industriegeschichte). 1. Auflage. Klartext, Essen 2008, ISBN 978-3-89861-231-9, S. 23–28.
