= Derringer (disambiguation) =

A derringer is a type of pistol.

Derringer or Deringer may also refer to:

== Art and entertainment ==
- Derringer, album by Rick Derringer
- Miss Derringer, American rock band
- President Derringer, character in the 2025 American film Heads of State
- Yancy Derringer, American television series

== Companies ==
- American Derringer, American firearms manufacturer
- Bond Arms Derringer Manufacture, a.k.a. Bond Arms, American firearms manufacturer
- Freshfields Bruckhaus Deringer, a.k.a. Freshfields LLP, British law firm

== People ==
- Derringer (surname)
- Deringer (surname)

== Science and technology ==
- Wing Derringer, 1958 American plane by John Thorp
- 28784 Deringer, planet named for Nancy Deringer

== Weapons ==
- COP .357 Derringer, 1974 American gun by Robert Hillberg
- Deringer Model 1814, a.k.a. Model 1814 common rifle, 1814 American gun by Robert T. Wickham
- Deringer M1817 rifle, a.k.a. Model 1817 common rifle, 1817 American gun by Robert T. Wickham
- Dixie Derringer, product of American revolver manufacturer Charter Arms
- DoubleTap derringer, 2011 American gun by Ray Kohout
- Hexen derringer, a.k.a. pepper-box, type of pistol
- High Standard Derringer, 1962 American gun by High Standard Manufacturing Company
- Philadelphia Deringer, 1825 American gun by Henry Deringer and the original derringer
- Remington Derringer, a.k.a. Remington Model 95, 1865 American gun by William H. Elliot
- Remington Zig-Zag Derringer, 1860 American gun by Eliphalet Remington
