= Döring (surname) =

Döring (or Doring) is a German surname. It is derived from the word Thüringer, the German demonym for residents of Thuringia.

- Adolfo Doring, American filmmaker
- Alfred Döring (born 1933), German middle-distance runner
- André Döring (born 1972), Brazilian footballer
- Christian Döring (canoeist), German slalom canoeist
- Christian Döring (Bible publisher) (c. 1480 – after 1533), German bible publisher
- Danny Doring, ring name of Daniel Morrison (born 1974), American professional wrestler
- Dorin Genpo, common name of Hans Rudolf Döring (born 1955), German Buddhist priest
- Federico Döring (born 1971), Mexican politician
- Felix Döring (born 1991), German politician and teacher
- Hans Döring (né Ritter; c. 1490–1558), German painter
- Hans Döring (SS-Brigadeführer) (1901–1970), German SS officer and politician
- Heinrich Döring (né Michael Johann Heinrich Döring; 1789–1862), German writer, theologian and mineralogist
- Julius Döring (1818–1898), Baltic German painter and archaeologist
- Klaus Döring (born 1938), German classical philologist and philosophical historian
- Kurt-Bertram von Döring (1889–1960), German flying ace
- Manfred Döring (1932–2023), German police officer
- Margret Hofheinz-Döring (1910–1994), German painter and graphic artist
- Matthias Döring (c. 1390s–1469), German Franciscan historian and theologian
- Nick Döring, Swedish death metal bassist (Opeth)
- Nils Döring (born 1980), German footballer
- Patrick Döring (born 1973), German politician
- Peter Döring (born 1943), German wrestler
- Steffen Döring (born 1960), German speed skater
- Theodor Döring (1803–1878), German actor
- Werner Döring (1911–2006), German theoretical physicist
- Wolfgang Döring (1919–1963), German politician

== See also ==
- Daniel Döringer (born 1991), German footballer
- Doering (surname)
- Derringer (surname)
- Deringer (surname)
