= Edward Snowden in popular culture =

Edward Snowden
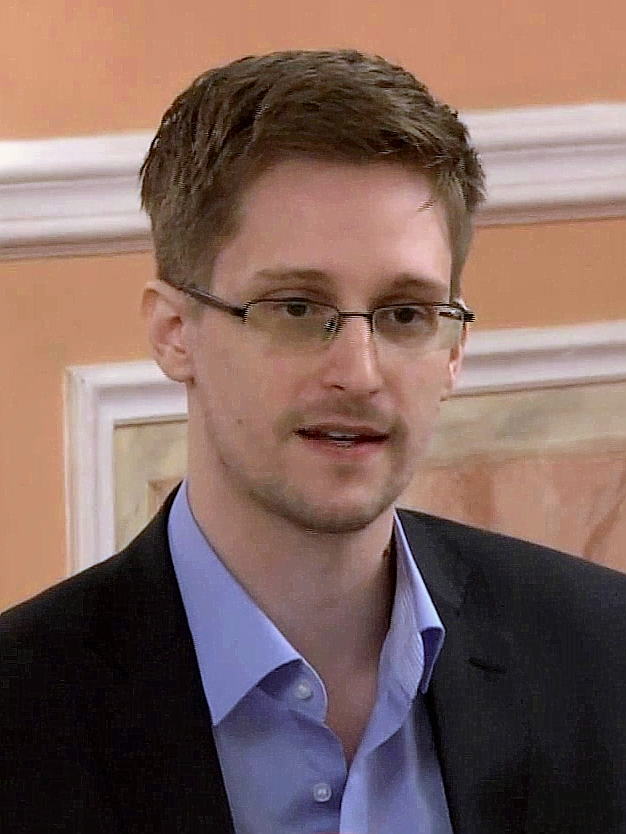
- Snowden in Moscow, October 9, 2013

Edward Snowden is an American whistleblower, known for his disclosures of classified documents revealing the existence of global surveillance programs. The reactions to global surveillance disclosures have established Snowden in popular culture as a figure in cinema, advertising, video games, literature, music, statuary, and social media.

== Cinema ==
=== Shorts ===
Snowden's passage through Hong Kong inspired a local production team to produce a low-budget five-minute film titled Verax. The film, depicting the time Snowden spent hiding in the Mira Hotel while being unsuccessfully tracked by the CIA and China's Ministry of State Security, was uploaded to YouTube in June 2013.

=== Feature films ===
A dramatic thriller, Classified: The Edward Snowden Story, was released on September 19, 2014. This feature-length film, which was crowdfunded and offered as a free download, was directed by Jason Bourque and produced by Travis Doering. Actor Kevin Zegers played Edward Snowden, Michael Shanks played Glenn Greenwald and Carmen Aguirre played Laura Poitras.

In 2014, film director Oliver Stone bought the rights to Time of the Octopus, a forthcoming novel based on Snowden's life and written by his Russian lawyer, Anatoly Kucherena. Stone said he would use both Kucherena's book and Luke Harding's nonfiction The Snowden Files for the screenplay of his movie, which began production later in 2014. Stone's biopic Snowden, which was released in September 2016, had Snowden portrayed by American actor Joseph Gordon-Levitt, with a short appearance by Snowden himself in the last few minutes of the film. Shortly before release, Stone said that Snowden should be pardoned, calling him a "patriot above all" and suggesting that he should run the NSA himself.

Snowden appears briefly as a character in the 2018 comedy-thriller The Spy Who Dumped Me, in which he is played by British actor Tom Stourton.

=== Documentaries ===
A trailer for Citizenfour (2014)

On October 10, 2014, Citizenfour, a documentary about Snowden, received its world premiere at the New York Film Festival. Earlier that year, director Laura Poitras told Associated Press she was editing the film in Berlin because she feared her source material would be seized by the government inside the U.S. The two-hour film was shot in various countries, tracing Snowden's time in Hong Kong and Moscow. The film was released in the U.S. and Europe to wide acclaim from critics, and won the 2015 Academy Award for Best Documentary Feature. Snowden declared in a February 2015 Reddit AMA ("Ask Me Anything") that he had no commercial interest in the film.

In October 2014, Killswitch, a film that features Snowden as well as Aaron Swartz, Lawrence Lessig and Tim Wu, received its world premiere at the Woodstock Film Festival, where it won the award for Best Editing. It has since played alongside Citizenfour at the International Documentary Film Festival Amsterdam and has continued an international film festival run. The film probes the efforts of big business to control the Internet, the efforts of government to regulate it, the efforts of hacktivists to free up information worldwide and the consequences.

A second Snowden documentary, titled Snowden's Great Escape, coproduced by Germany's Norddeutscher Rundfunk and Denmark's DR TV, was released in 2015. Filmed in Moscow, it incorporated two new interviews with Snowden and was awarded first prize in the documentaries category by Deutsche Fernsehakademie.

In June 2018 as part of the anniversary of the revelations from Snowden, the documentary "Edward Snowden: Whistleblower or Spy", produced by Signpost Film Productions and GTV, was released on Norwegian, Danish and Dutch Television and is continuing its further international release. The documentary presents interviews with participants and witnesses, some of whom have never before spoken on camera, and aims to incorporate the wide variety of views on the revelations. The documentary was released October 4, 2018, at the Fraud Film Festival and was shown at the Cyber Security week also on October 4, 2018, both in the Netherlands.

== Television ==
Homeland, an American television series on Showtime, had an hours-long video call with Snowden to inform the writers and actors on storylines for the show. This was prior to him doing interviews or documentaries.

A parody of Snowden, named "Znowden", appears in the 2019 Lupin III anime TV special, Goodbye Partner. As a fan of the series, Snowden compared it to a lifetime achievement award.

Animaniacs featured a parody of Snowden on Pinky and the Brain, where he is depicted as having an unhealthy fixation on his vast houseplant collection. He helps the duo break into the NSA as part of their plan to take over the world, but only in exchange for "rescuing" a beloved rare fern from his old office.

Season 2 of the Russian dark comedy series The Last Minister features an alternate reality Snowden played by Odin Biron as a disillusioned expat using his hero status to pick up girls in a Moscow movie theatre showing reruns of Oliver Stone's biopic of himself.

== Advertising ==
In the District of Columbia, the Partnership for Civil Justice Fund (PCJF), a free speech advocacy group, crowdfunded an ad saying "Thank You Edward Snowden" that was featured on the sides of a D.C. city bus for four weeks in late 2013. The PCJF said they received enough support from around the world to sponsor partial ads on five more buses in 2014.

== Video games ==
Snowden has been featured in video games and has an action figure made in his image. Although not endorsed by Snowden, proceeds from the $99 doll are donated to Freedom of the Press Foundation, where he serves on the board of directors.

== Graphic novel ==
In May 2014, Beyond: Edward Snowden, a graphic novel by Marvel Comics writer Valerie D'Orazio, illustrated by Dan Lauer, appeared in both print and digital editions as part a new series from Bluewater Productions, which the publisher said would reveal secret and suppressed stories.

== Music ==
On February 9, 2015, electronic pop producer Big Data released a song called "Snowed In" that featured vocals from Weezer frontman Rivers Cuomo from his debut album, 2.0. The song's lyrics, inspired by Snowden, are told from the perspective of the NSA, alternating between inner dialogue and statements made to the press.

In 2016, Snowden provided the vocals for a track titled "Exit" by digital composer Jean-Michel Jarre. The track interspersed a beat and a few notes with a recorded monologue by Snowden expressing views about digital privacy. Business news publication Quartz described it as "not exactly music" and part of a "gimmicky new wave of political audio".

In 2016, the rock band Thrice released a song titled "Whistleblower" off of the album To Be Everywhere Is to Be Nowhere. The song is written from the perspective of Snowden.

In 2017, Australian Metalcore band Northlane released the song 'Citizen' off of the album "Mesmer". The song's lyrics discuss whistleblowers exposing governments' surveillance of the general population, and ends with the lyric "Thank you Mr. Snow", directly referring to Snowden.

== Statuary ==
On the April 5, 2015, episode of Last Week Tonight with John Oliver, John Oliver interviewed Snowden in Moscow. The next day, activists briefly attached a bust of Snowden to the Prison Ship Martyrs' Monument in Fort Greene Park in Brooklyn, New York City, before being taken down by city officials. Hours after the statue was removed, it was replaced by an ephemeral hologram image of Snowden. Authorities later returned the statue to its artists.

On May Day 2015, an art installation by Italian Davide Dormino titled Anything to Say? was placed in Berlin's Alexanderplatz. It featured bronze sculptures of Snowden, Julian Assange, and Chelsea Manning standing on chairs beside a fourth, empty chair meant as a platform for public speaking.

== Social media ==
Snowden opened a Twitter account on September 29, 2015, amassing over a million followers in the first 24 hours; he followed only the NSA. His first tweet received 121,728 retweets and 117,750 favorites.
