= Henry Deringer Sr. =

American gunsmith (1756–1833)

- Born: Heinrich Deringer; 1 January 1756; Thuringia, Holy Roman Empire
- Died: 28 December 1833 (aged 77); Easton, Pennsylvania, U.S.
- Occupation: Gunsmith
- Spouse: Catherine McQuety (1759–1829)
- Children: Henry Deringer Jr.

Henry Deringer Sr. (born Heinrich Deringer; 1 January 1756 – 28 December 1833) was a German-American gunsmith. He was the father and mentor of Henry Deringer Jr., the inventor and namesake of the derringer pistol.

== Early life ==
Henry Deringer Sr. was born Heinrich Deringer on 1 January 1756 in Thuringia, in the Holy Roman Empire, and moved to America before the Revolutionary War. The surname Deringer stems from the German demonym for a resident of Thuringia, Thüringer, which also gave rise to the surname Döringer (and its variant Doeringer).

== Career ==
Deringer's workshop produced several types of the highly regarded Kentucky rifle and Kentucky pistol using the flintlock action. Originally based in Richmond, Virginia, the family moved to Philadelphia in 1806, where Deringer continued to work on the Kentucky rifle, notably narrowing the stock, adding a more crescent-shaped buttplate, and decorating with more inlay work than on previous models. One of the rifles he developed was a basic version suited for the United States Army, which he supplied to the government under contract.

== Personal life and death ==
Henry Deringer Sr. married Catherine McQuety, and together they had a son, Henry Jr. The younger Deringer joined his father as an apprentice in the early 19th century and created in 1825 the first derringer pistol, which would later be known as the Philadelphia Deringer.

Henry Deringer Sr. died in Easton, Pennsylvania, on 28 December 1833. He is buried in the Easton German Reformed Graveyard in Northampton, Pennsylvania.
