= Doering (surname) =

Doering is a German surname. It is a variant of Döring. Notable people with the surname include:

- Aaron Doering (born 1971), American professor
- Art Doering (1915–1988), American golfer
- Bernd von Doering (1903–1944), German general
- Charles R. Doering (1956–2021), American professor
- Chris Doering (born 1973), American football player
- Cornelia Jacob (née Doering; born 1960), German speed skater
- Hans Georg von Doering (1866–1921), German officer and colonial governor
- Hans-Wilhelm Doering-Manteuffel (1898–1963), German general
- Jadwiga Doering (1938–2018), Polish sprint canoer
- Jason Doering (born 1978), American football player
- Joe Doering (1982–2026), American professional wrestler
- Jordan Doering (born 1979), Australian rules footballer
- Kyle Doering (born 1995), Canadian curler
- Lothar Doering (born 1950), German handball player
- María Helena Doering (born 1962), Colombian actress and model
- Mavis Doering (1929–2007), American basketmaker
- Sabine Doering-Manteuffel (née Künsting), German ethnologist
- Sina-Drums, stage name of Sina Doering (born 1999), German drummer
- Tamara Doering, American microbiologist
- Travis Doering (born 1991), Canadian entrepreneur and film producer
- William von Eggers Doering (1917–2011), American chemist

== See also ==
- Eric Doeringer (born 1974), American artist
