= Manfred Döring =

German police officer (1932–2023)

- Born: 18 November 1932; Oberfrohna, Saxony, Germany
- Died: 25 December 2023 (aged 91); Erkner, Germany
- Occupations: Major general and; commander of the Felix Dzerzhinsky Guards Regiment; MfS
- Political party: SED

Manfred Döring (18 November 1932 – 25 December 2023) was a Major general (Generalmajor) with the East German Ministry for State Security (Stasi). He also served, between 1987 and 1990, as a commander of the elite motorised rifles regiment, the Felix Dzerzhinsky Guards.

== Biography ==
Döring was born in Oberfrohna, a small town, not far away from the west of Chemnitz (known before 1990 as Karl-Marx-Stadt) that had grown up as a centre for textiles based industries. His father was a tailor.

Manfred Döring passed his School final exam (Abitur) and in 1952 moved on to attend the Commando Academy of the Kasernierte Volkspolizei (KVP / literally People's Police in Barracks). Döring's region of Germany was by now part of the German Democratic Republic, a Soviet sponsored state created in 1949 out of what had previously been known as the Soviet occupation zone of Germany. Following military defeat in 1945 there had been agreement between the winning powers that there should be no more German armies, and the quasi-military KVP was, for East Germany, the closest thing to a national army permitted by the Soviets. In 1953 Döring was accepted as a junior KVP officer. Between 1953 and 1956, he attended the Officers' Academy of the KVP, emerging as a platoon commander. During this period, in 1956, the KVP had itself been re-invented as the National People's Army (NVA / Nationale Volksarmee).

In 1958 he became an instructor with the Guards Regiment of the Berlin MfS (Stasi), later becoming a battery commander with the regiment and, in 1959, Chief of Staff in the Artillery Division. Rapid promotions continued. In 1961 he was appointed Operational Officer of the Regimental Staff. In 1962 Döring took over as Commander of the Artillery Division. Between 1965 and 1968 he attended the Friedrich Engels Military Academy in Dresden where he obtained a degree in Military Sciences.

On 21 August 1968 he became the Commander of the Second Commandos of the Felix Dzerzhinsky Guards Regiment, a unit so prestigious that none of its members were conscripts. Despite its military character the Felix Dzerzhinsky Guards Regiment operated not as part of the National People's Army, but under the direct control of the Ministry for State Security. Outside times of crisis, it was mandated to protect public buildings and the homes of party leaders. The regiment was a politically reliable internal security force that could also be deployed to suppress rebellion and unrest. In Summer 1971 Döring was promoted at short notice, becoming principal Deputy to the regimental commander, Heinz Gronau. Gronau himself retired just a year later, to be succeeded in the top job by Bernhard Elsner.

During 1975/76 he spent a year at the Karl Marx Academy, the leading political training institution in the country, operated by the Central Committee of East Germany's ruling Socialist Unity Party (Sozialistische Einheitspartei Deutschlands / SED). Eisler's incumbency in command of the Felix Dzerzhinsky Guards lasted for fifteen years, but he eventually retired and in 1987 Manfred Döring took over command of the regiment. He took over at a time when relations between the ruling parties in East Germany and in the Soviet Union were becoming strained in ways that many outsiders missed at the time, and there was a corresponding loss of confidence within the East German political establishment. The regiment itself had grown steadily through the 1960s and 1970s, however, and Döring was in charge of a force of more than 10,000 full-time Stasi employees with responsibilities that included security services for leading state institutions and officers and provision of body guards. He also had responsibility for the policing of demonstrations and large-scale public gatherings, whether permitted or illegal. The breach by demonstrators of the Berlin Wall in November 1989 came towards the end of a year of unprecedented civil unrest, and there was no fraternal support from Moscow for the violent state intervention that had put an end to the country's last major uprising, back in 1953. Instead November 1989 triggered a succession of events which would lead, formally in October 1990, to German reunification. Bemused by the strategic folly of Moscow's evident willingness to see an end to the political division of Europe, and in particular of Germany, in March 1990 Manfred Döring, like many of the regime's political and military leaders, was dismissed from his post.

Döring died on 25 December 2023, at the age of 91.
