= Christian Döring =

Christian Döring may refer to:

- Christian Döring (Bible publisher), a 16th-century German Bible publisher
- Christian Döring (canoeist), a German slalom canoeist
