= Doering =

Doering may refer to:

- Doering (surname)
- Doering, Wisconsin, an unincorporated community in Schley, Wisconsin
- Roberta G. Doering School, a middle school in Agawam, Massachusetts
