= Waldsiedlung =

Former residence of the leadership of East Germany

Coordinates: 52°44′03″N 13°29′11″E

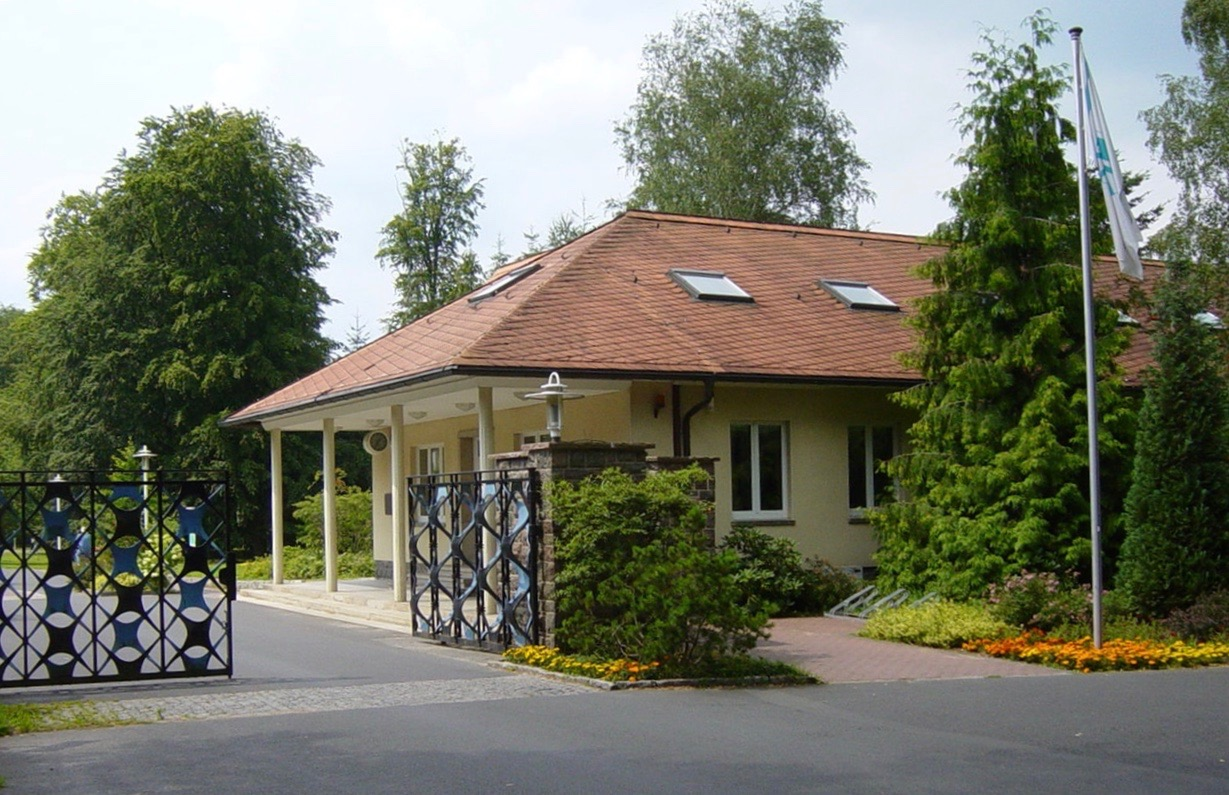
A former entrance gate into Waldsiedlung

Waldsiedlung (German for "Forest settlement") was the secure housing zone for the leaders of the German Democratic Republic in Bernau bei Berlin, Brandenburg from 1960 to 1989. Waldsiedlung housed the most senior party members of the ruling Socialist Unity Party of Germany (SED) in relative luxury near Wandlitz, 30 kilometres (19 mi) north of East Berlin, with surrounding areas off-limits to all ordinary citizens.

Security was provided by soldiers of the Felix Dzerzhinsky Guards Regiment.

Nowadays, the community is treated by Germans as a symbol of the elite in the SED party when it ruled East Germany.

== History ==
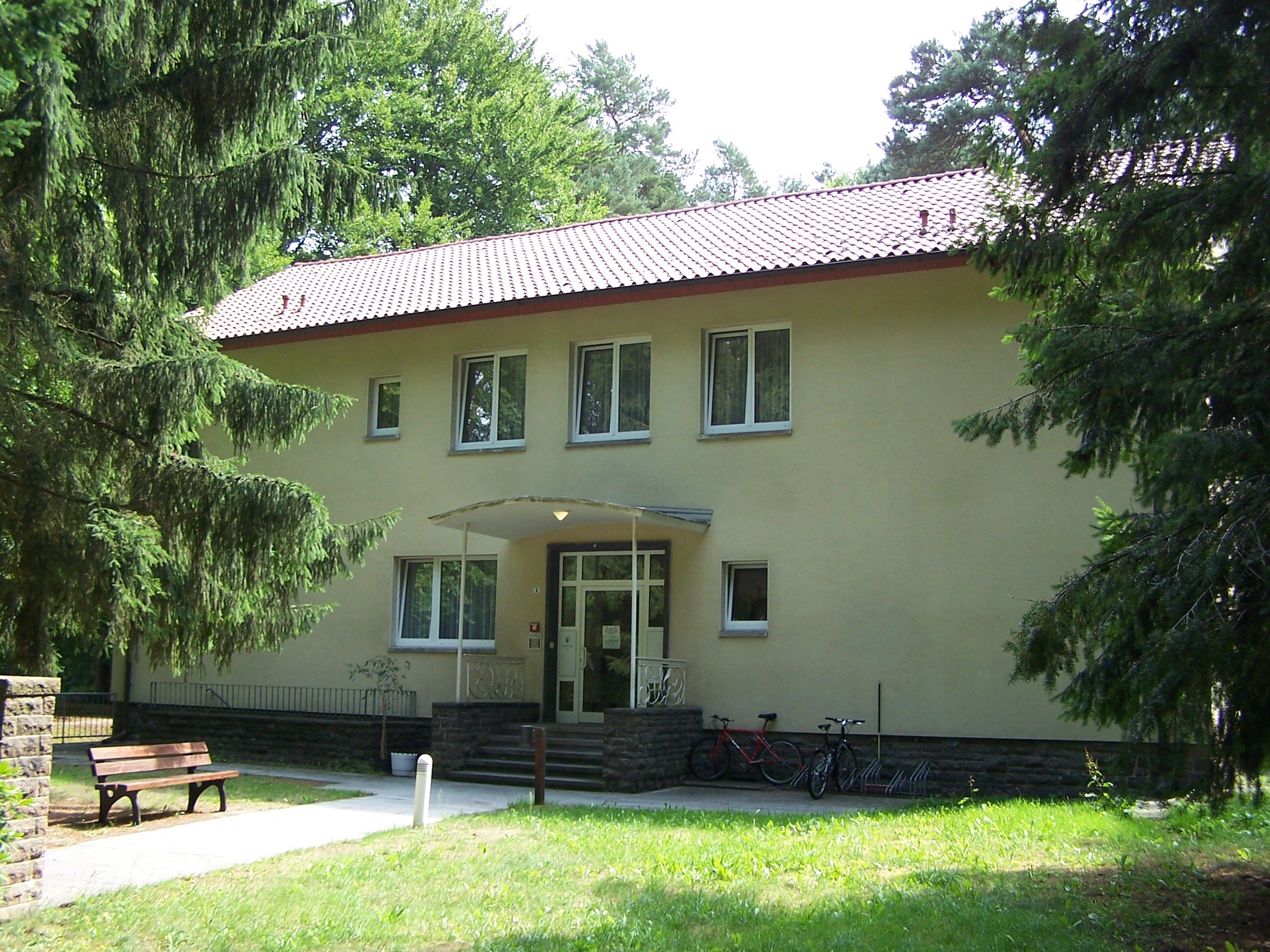
Former House 11 where Erich and Margot Honecker lived

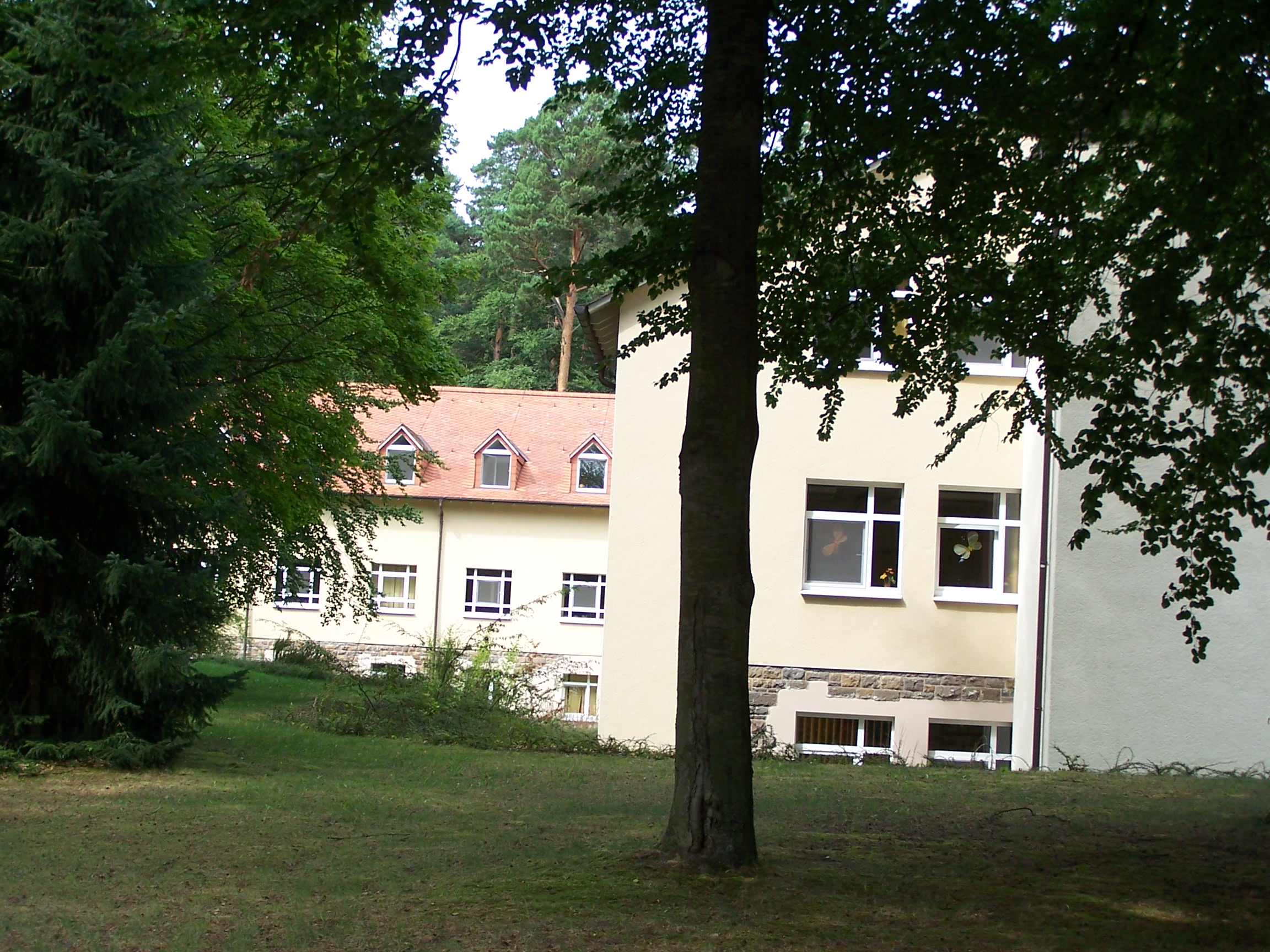
Former shop

The German Democratic Republic (GDR) was established in 1949 as a communist state from the Soviet Zone of Occupation. The GDR was de facto ruled by the Socialist Unity Party of Germany (SED), whose leadership initially lived in mansions on the upscale Majakowskiring in the Pankow district of East Berlin. After the events of the Hungarian Revolution of 1956, the SED party leadership decided to build themselves a secure residential zone in a more remote location than their mansions on the Majakowskiring.

Construction of the Waldsiedlung began in 1958, two years later after an SED resolution, in a remote wooded area belonging to the city of Bernau bei Berlin in Bezirk Frankfurt, around 30 kilometres (19 mi) north of East Berlin. The housing complex was constructed through an agency subordinate to the Ministry for State Security (Stasi) and was completed in 1960. Waldsiedlung was occupied by senior politicians and their families under the protection of the Stasi's bodyguard department, and relocating there became mandatory for all Politburo members.

Among East Germans, the Waldsiedlung was colloquially called Wandlitz, after the nearby village. In the 1980s, Waldsiedlung became known by the tongue-in-cheek nickname "Volvograd", both in reference to the Soviet city of Volgograd and the GDR political elite's use of Volvo cars from Sweden (after initially using luxury Soviet Chaikas).

Waldsiedlung consisted of 23 semi-detached family houses with 180 m^{2} (1,900 sq ft) of land each within the inner ring. The site had a club house (de) with a cinema and a restaurant, a shop where a limited selection of subsidized luxury Western goods could be purchased with East German marks, a market garden, a health clinic, a shooting range, a swimming pool, a sports field, and tennis courts. There were also barracks and social buildings for site employees and guards. During the Honecker-era, cooks at Waldsiedlung were required to produce gourmet-level meals. In addition to high-quality East German food products, western products such as Beaujolais wines and seltzer water were imported from West Berlin. In 1983, a nuclear bunker with the capacity to accommodate 400 people was completed in Waldsiedlung.

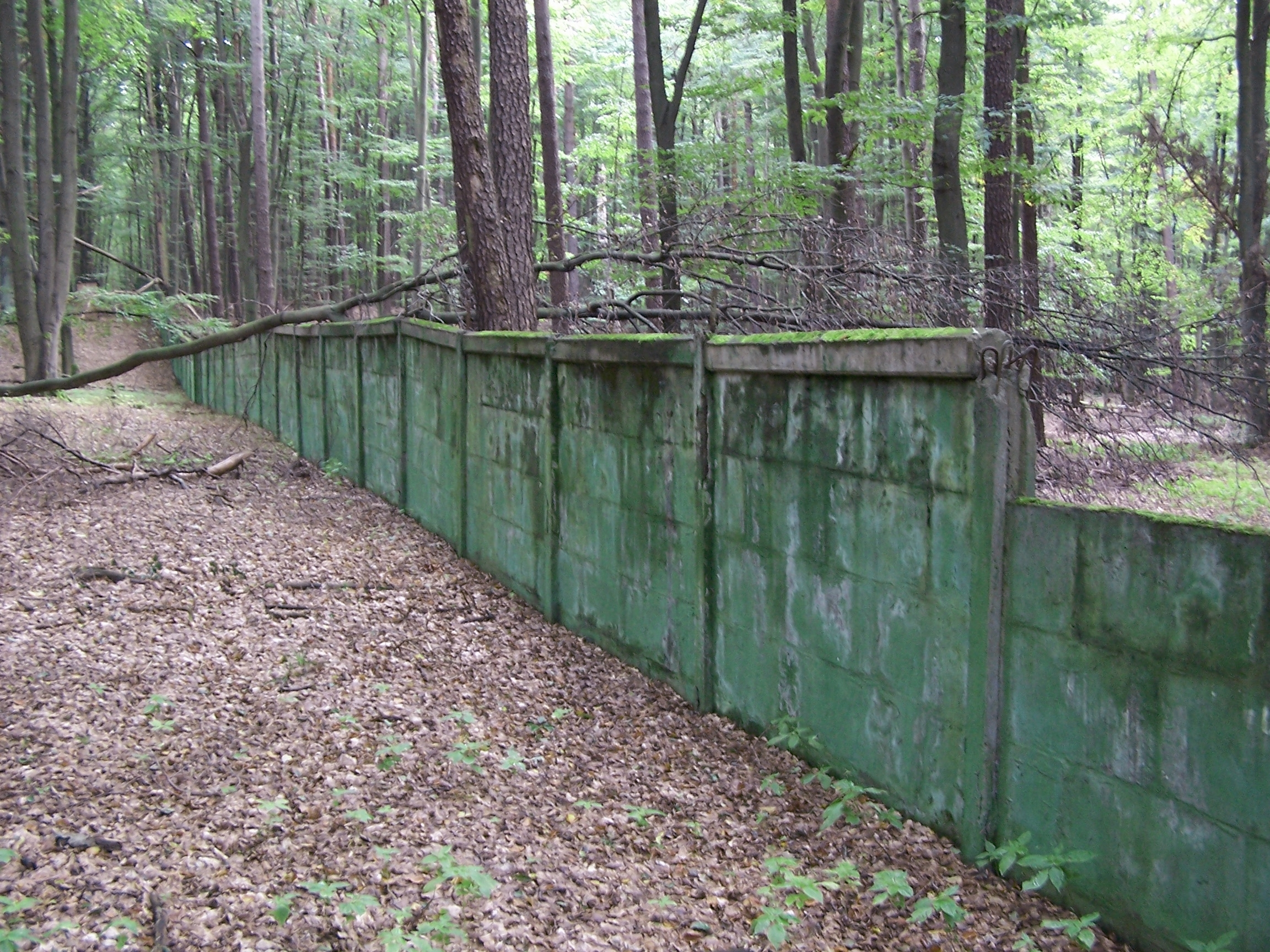
Wall on the western edge of the area in its original height, from the inside.

In late 1989, Waldsiedlung's inhabitants had to leave the settlement in accordance with a resolution adopted by the GDR government under Premier Hans Modrow. After German reunification, Waldsiedlung became home to a rehabilitation clinic and private residences, and was brought under the administration of Bernau bei Berlin on 1 July 2001.

In June 2017, the Brandenburg state government placed the historic buildings of Waldsiedlung under monument protection.

As of 2021, tours to Waldsiedlung are allowed for anyone who wants to look around the area.

== Layout ==
Waldsiedlung covered an area of around 2 square kilometres (0.77 sq mi), although the area's perimeter was not immediately recognizable from the outside. The 5 kilometres (3.1 mi) outer ring consisted of a wire mesh fence on which signs indicated a "wildlife research area". The inner ring was surrounded by a two-metre high green security wall and could only be entered with special passes. The four entrance gates were guarded by members of the Felix Dzerzhinsky Guards Regiment, the paramilitary wing of the Stasi, and troops were stationed at 31 watchtowers within the outer fence.

In the 1970s, a four-lane autobahn connected Waldsiedlung directly to East Berlin.
