= Adventure learning =

Adventure learning is a hybrid distance education approach pioneered at St. Thomas University in the 1990s and defined in 2006 by Aaron Doering of the University of Minnesota.

== History ==
In the early 1990s, explorers such as Will Steger, Dan Buettner, Robert Ballard, Lonnie Dupree, Paul Pregont, and Mille Porsild began experimenting with ways to use technology to connect classrooms with their experiences on the trail. The Jason program (founded by Ballard) pushed the envelope of transmitting from the field as they communicated while diving the ocean, and Classroom Connect (founded by Buetner) generated a comprehensive curriculum and learning objectives tied to the field experiences, drawing in learners with their "student-choose-the-route" approach. NOMADS Online Classroom Expeditions (founded by Pregont & Porsild) facilitated the first full-scale adventure learning program with Arctic Blast 2001. Defining advances were made with student, educators and subject-matter experts being able to collaborate online on tasks within a secure space as well as participate in moderated chats using Lotus Notes, Sametime Chat, and Quickplaces, earning the IBM Beacon Award for best educational use worldwide of IBM technologies in 2002. In this way PolarHusky.com was established; the largest scale adventure learning programming to date, with participation of more than 7000 schools in 38 countries on five continents.

In 2006, based upon research and collaboration with PolarHusky.com, Aaron Doering published the first established definition, framework, and guiding principles of adventure learning. The guiding principles were refined by Doering and Charles Miller in 2009. The first adventure learning program “supported by theory and long-term research” was the GoNorth! Adventure Learning Series of circumpolar Arctic dogsledding expeditions at PolarHusky.com which reached millions of learners worldwide and explored such topics as sustainability, the environment, science, and traditional cultures. Other examples of adventure learning projects include Earthducation, the Jason Project, Ride To Learn with the To Learn Series, and the Quest series of bicycle treks.
