= High Standard Derringer =

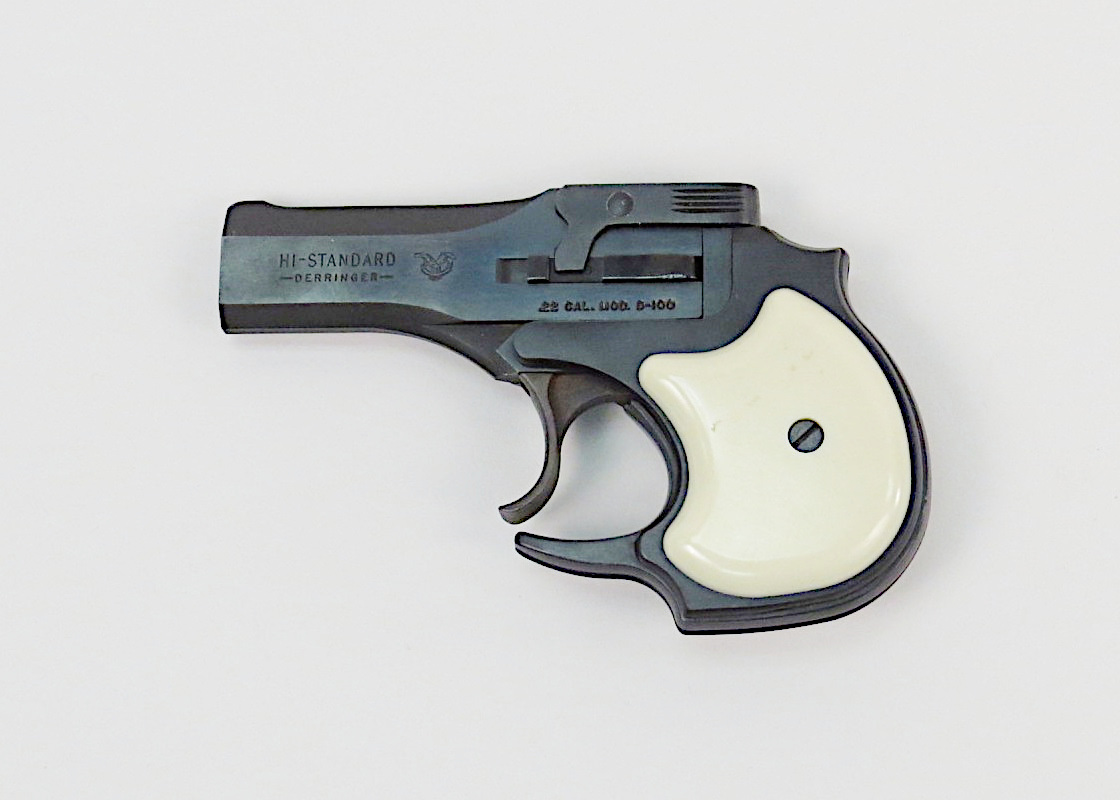
- The "High Standard Derringer".
- Type: Derringer
- Place of origin: United States

Production history
- Manufacturer: High Standard Manufacturing Company
- Produced: 1962–1984

Specifications (genitron.com)
- Mass: 11 ounces (310 g)
- Length: 5.125 inches (130.2 mm)
- Barrel length: 3.5 inches (89 mm)
- Caliber: .22 Long Rifle
- Action: Double Action Only
- Feed system: 2 round
- Sights: Fixed, forward blade and rear notch

High Standard Derringer was introduced by High Standard Manufacturing Company in 1962; it was a remarkable change to the over-under derringer design with innovative solutions.

The original model (D-100), was produced from 1962 to 1967 in 22 LR only in blued finish. In 1969 the D-101 (.22 LR) and DM-101 (.22 Magnum) upgraded models were released in blued, nickel, silver, and gold plated finishes.

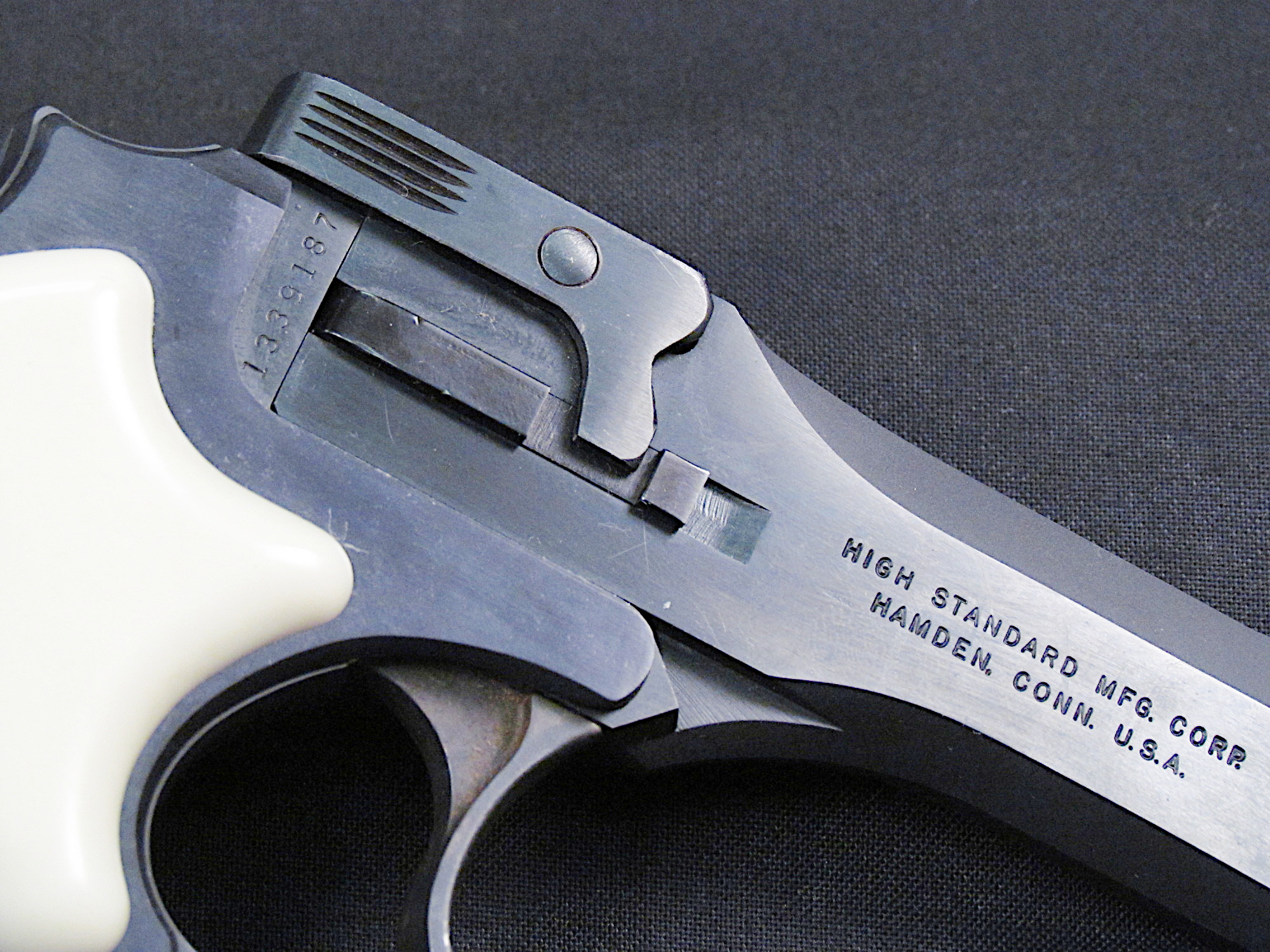
Close up of a High Standard Derringer.

In the early 1980s, High Standard Firearms had been dealing with financial problems and had to cease derringer production in 1984. Benjamin Johnson Technologies scaled up the design, into a .38 Special pocket gun known as the DA38 Derringer. In 1990, the design went to the American Derringer Company.

== See also ==
- Remington Model 95
- COP .357 Derringer
- DoubleTap derringer
- Pocket pistol
- Remington Zig-Zag Derringer
