= Felix Dzerzhinsky Guards Regiment =

- Wachregiment "Feliks E. Dzierzynski"
- Felix Dzerzhinsky Guards Regiment insignia
- Active: November 1954 – 2 October 1990
- Country: East Germany
- Branch: Ministry for State Security
- Type: Motorized infantry
- Size: 11,426 (1989)
- Garrison/HQ: Adlershof, East Berlin
- March: Präsentiermarsch des Wachregiment "Feliks Dzierzynski"

Insignia
- Regimental flag

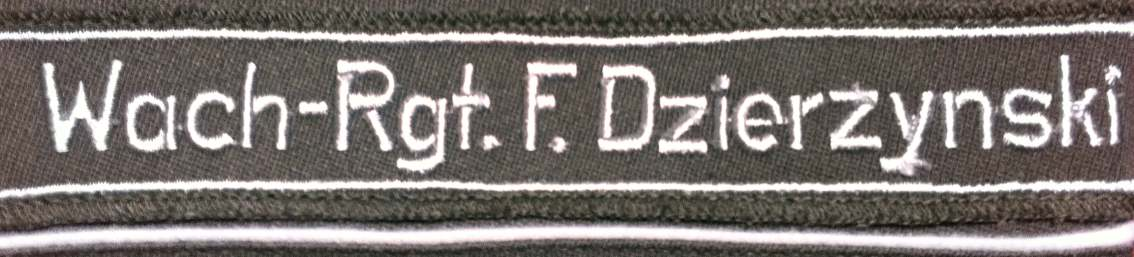
- Cuffband

The Felix Dzerzhinsky Guards Regiment (German: Wachregiment "Feliks E. Dzierzynski") was the paramilitary wing of the Ministry for State Security (Stasi), the security service of the German Democratic Republic (GDR).

The Felix Dzerzhinsky Guards Regiment was called a regiment, and as time went on, the elite formation grew to the size of a motorized infantry division with its constituent Kommandos made up of battalions. Its role in the Stasi was the protection of buildings and high-ranking officials of the GDR government and the Socialist Unity Party of Germany and was also a highly trained Motorized Infantry and public security force.

It was composed of experienced and ideologically reliable men separate from the National People's Army that could be deployed to suppress rebellion and unrest.

== History ==
The Guards Battalion A at the MfS (Wachbataillon A beim MfS) was founded on January 1, 1951 as an armed force to complement the Ministry for State Security (MfS or Stasi), the security service of the German Democratic Republic (GDR). The GDR was a de facto communist state established in 1949 from the Soviet occupation zone and was ruled by the Socialist Unity Party of Germany (SED) with significant Soviet influence. Despite authoritarian measures to suppress political opposition, the threat of instability remained. The SED followed the Soviet model of creating a dedicated elite and politically loyal armed force to protect itself.

The Guards Battalion A participated in the suppression of the Uprising of 1953 against the SED's Stalinist policies. In November 1954, the Guards Battalion A was set up as the official paramilitary wing of the Stasi and its staff headquartered in Adlershof, East Berlin. In August 1961, units of the Guards Battalion A participated in the construction of the Berlin Wall. In 1967, the Guards Battalion A was officially renamed the Felix Dzerzhinsky Guards Regiment (Wachregiment "Feliks E. Dzierzynski") in honor of Felix Dzerzhinsky, founder of the Cheka.

The Felix Dzerzhinsky Guards Regiment's major task was the protection of the SED, especially its buildings in the capital of East Berlin, and from 1960 providing security for the party leaders' private residential compound, Waldsiedlung, located 24 kilometres (15 mi) north of Berlin near Wandlitz.

The Stasi was disbanded on 13 January 1990 and its facilities and responsibilities taken over by the GDR's Ministry of the Interior (Ministerium des Innern), but the regiment continued to exist. The Felix Dzerzhinsky Guards Regiment was formally dissolved on 2 October 1990, the day before the GDR was dissolved in the German reunification.

== Duties ==
Even though the FDGR's main duties were to ensure the safety of SED official and party members, it could also be mobilized to conduct some commando operations when required.

Scholarly research into the regiment after the end of the Cold War mentions that FDGR soldiers had trained PLO and other Middle Eastern and South American-based terrorists at a classified military base known as Objekt 74 at Briesen.

== Organization ==
At full strength, the regiment consisted of over 11,200 personnel, including 2,500 officers, 8,735 NCOs and enlisted men, and nine civil staff. Its commander was a Major General after 1956.

=== Structure ===
- Three combat groups with six motorized rifle battalions and three training battalions
- Artillery Battalion
- Engineer Battalion
- Medical, signal, support and reconnaissance companies.
- Helicopter Squadron with six Mi-2s and Mi-8s and Mi-24s.
- Stasi Arbeitsgruppe des Ministers S

==== Reorganization ====
The Regiment was subdivided into the following commands from 1980 to 1989:

- Kommando 1 – Standort Adlershof, Standorte in den Bezirken (Command 1 - Location Adlershof, locations in the districts)
- Kommando 2 – Standort Erkner (Command 2 - Location Erkner)
- Kommando 3 – Standort Teupitz (Command 3 - Location Teupitz)
- Kommando 4 – Standort Eberswalde-Finow (Command 4 - Location Eberswalde-Finow) - later (mid 1980s) in Erkner, Prenden and Biesenthal
- Kommando 5 – Standort Berlin (Command 5 - Location Berlin) - until 1982, then Freienbrink and Ahrensfelde

The sites were inherited by the Ahrensfelde guard regiment in mid-January 1989. Until then they had formed accommodation facilities for UAV units of the Ministry for State Security (e.g., backup units of VRD, BDL, HA VI, AGMS). These units were the uniformed as well as the guard and security units of the units of the Stasi (BV), not a subdivision of the guards regiment.

Part of these units were merged in January 1989 into the guard regiment, which is why the site was taken over by the Ahrensfelde guard regiment.

Until 1989, the guard regiment had no locations in the districts. The service objects there were guarded by the WSE, which were placed under the respective BV.

=== Senior management ===
Commanders of the guards regiment were:

- 1962 to 1972: Major General Heinz Gronau (provisional)
- 1972 to 1987: Colonel (Major General since 1976) Bernhard Elsner
- 1987 to 1990: Major General Manfred Döring

=== Personnel strength ===
The personnel strength of the regiment:

- 1955: 1.475
- 1960: 4.372
- 1965: 5,121
- 1970: 7,924
- 1975: 9,245
- 1980: 10,082
- 1985: 10,192
- 1989: 11,426

=== Recruitment and training ===
Military service in the Guard regiment was completed as WED (abbr. Wehrersatzdienst, alternative military service). In contrast to the National People's Army, recruits were inducted in April and September / October, a month earlier.

Recruits were selected from soldiers and NCOs who served in the NVA as volunteers for three years. Sometimes, service with the FDGR could potentially lead to a career in the Stasi. Most soldiers in the regiment are known to be parachute-qualified. Several players of BFC Dynamo and SG Dynamo Dresden made their military service with the regiment, such as Lutz Eigendorf and Matthias Sammer. The head of the Stasi Erich Mielke was also the president of SV Dynamo.

It became publicly known in 2011 that also the incumbent president of football club 1. FC Union Berlin Dirk Zingler was a member of the Felix Dzerzhinsky Guards Regiment for three years during his military service. Dirk Zingler has explained that he had sought to spend his military service in Berlin and that he was unaware beforehand that the regiment belonged to the Stasi. It was, however, not possible to apply for the Felix Dzerzhinsky Guards Regiment. The Stasi selected who it thought fit to serve with the regiment.

== Equipment ==
=== Weapons ===
The FDGR received the same training and weapons as the Volkspolizei-Bereitschaft and some of its personnel were paratroopers. It was also equipped with modern armored fighting vehicles and armored personnel carriers, anti-tank guns, anti-aircraft weapons and mortars.

The regiment was equipped with small arms (Makarov, Walther PP, PM-63 RAK, AKM, AK-74, LMG, RPG-7). They were also reported to be armed with the StG-943 in 1989.

Stationed in the command 3 (on military Teupitz - cones), there was also a battalion of special weapons. It consisted of a company, which was armed with heavy anti-tank recoilless gun SPG-9 (in 1987, was reorganized into a rifle company), a company which is an essential weapon, the heavy machine gun (HMG-company) and had the 70mm - anti-aircraft missile armed "Strela-2 'Company. Until 1982 there was also an artillery detachment armed with 122mm D-30 howitzer. Previously, they had 85-mm PaK D-44, and 82mm mortars and 120 mm in the stock.

Regulators company RSK was additionally can be equipped with the AKS-74 around the shoulder stock to collapse. At least in the 1970s, the former intelligence battalion, the mortar batteries and the I-battalion with Kalashnikovs in the S version were equipped. Specialized units such as the honor companies (28. and 29 MSK of the 10th MSB) were fitted in addition to the above-mentioned weapons, rifles and sabers.

The paratrooper company, located in the reconnaissance battalion, also used the small Skorpion machine pistol from Czechoslovakia.

For large events, there were as accessories batons (flexible), down from 1989 shields and helmets and chains.

=== Vehicles ===
The FDGR had access to light armored personnel carriers such as the BTR-60PB and the PSzH-IV.

The six Mi-2s and Mi-8s and Mi-24s were used for personnel transport.

=== Uniforms ===
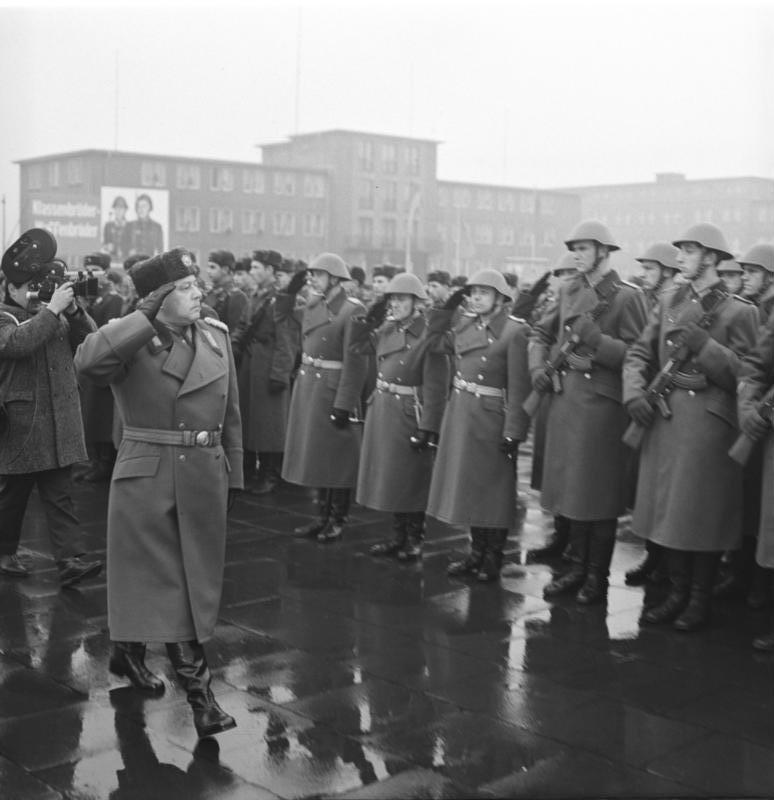
Erich Mielke at the awarding of the name of Feliks Edmundovich Dzerzhinsky on 15 December 1967

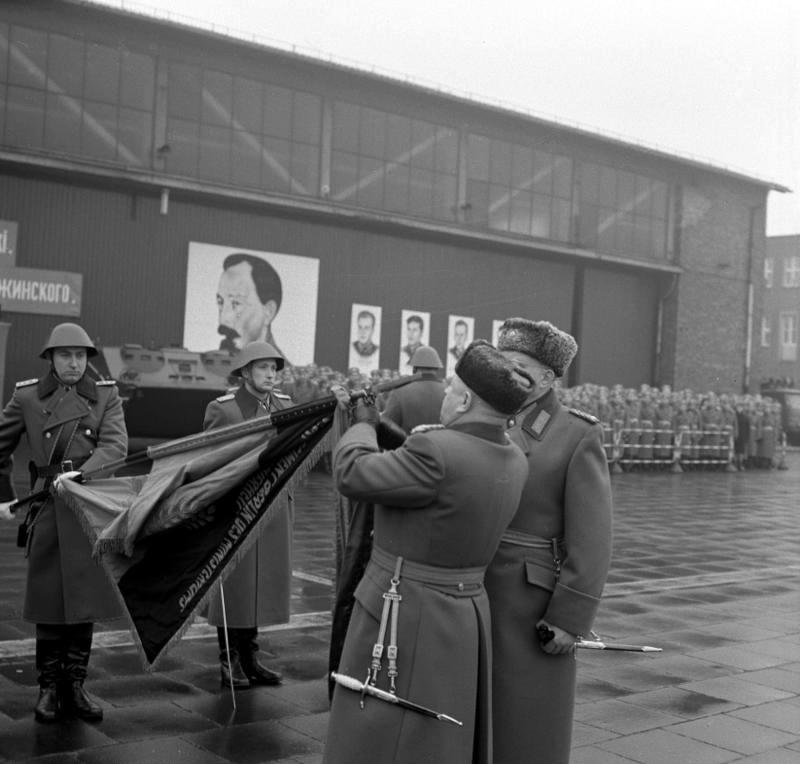
Erich Mielke (2. right) attaches the band name to the troops of the guards regiment flag

Its uniforms were nearly identical to those of the National People's Army (NVA) and were distinguished primarily by the dark red MfS service color of its insignia and by a cuff title on the left sleeve bearing the regiment's name. Other Stasi officers wore a similar uniform, but without the cuffband.

The service or dress uniform of the regiment was an army uniform made of high quality (of officers) with claret fabric collar and brown (officer) leather belt. The left sleeve was fitted with a cuffband and the words "wachregiment F. Dzerzhinsky".

Soldiers of the MOS units typically had the following personal uniforms:

- 1x Field Service Uniform (Fielddienstuniform) cap, tunic, trousers Parade (breeches), gray shirt, tie, boots grained, brown belt, cuff title
- 1x Semi-dress Uniform (Halbausgehuniform) - cap, tunic, output pants, gray shirt, tie, shoes, brown belt
- 1x summer field service uniform (Sommerdienstuniform), "Ein Strich - Kein Strich" ("one dash - no dash"), M56 Steel Helmet ( "eggshell") / cap, gray Gurtkoppel, boots grained)
- 1x Field Service Uniform Winter (Fielddienstuniform Winter), "Ein Strich - Kein Strich"
- 1x special service uniform (Sonderdienstuniform)– tunic, parade trousers (breeches), gray shirt, tie, an officer in plain boots, belts, NCO Professional version (with at least Corporal epaulets, even if the soldier in question was only temporary soldiers and rank only a soldier) (not in the personal cabinet)
- 1x Drillich (Arbeitsuniform) fatigues (work uniform)
- 1x Winter Service Uniform (Winterdienstuniform)
- 1x sport suit "SV Dynamo" in burgundy, white sneakers

In command 4 - Eberswalde-Finow in Bernau contributed UAZ, professional officers and professional officers uniforms of the regular army with weapons Color black (pioneers) and (white Motorized Rifle) to camouflage the Wachregimentseinsatzes.

== See also ==
- 1. Wachregiment "Friedrich Engels" (WR-1) guarded the Memorial to the Victims of Fascism and Militarism on Berlin's Unter den Linden and performed other honorary duties, including the welcoming ceremony for state visitors.
- 2. Wachregiment "Hugo Eberlein" (WR-2) guarded the Ministry for National Defense command center in Strausberg, near Berlin.
- 3. Separate Operational Purpose Division
- List of military units named after people
