= Classified: The Edward Snowden Story =

2014 television film

- Directed by: Jason Bourque
- Starring: Kevin Zegers; Michael Shanks; Carmen Aguirre
- Country of origin: Canada
- Original language: English

Production
- Producer: Travis Doering
- Budget: $1.7 million

Original release
- Release: 2014

Classified: The Edward Snowden Story was a 2014 feature film by Jason Bourque and Travis Doering starring Kevin Zegers, Michael Shanks and Carmen Aguirre.

== Plot ==
Classified: The Edward Snowden Story told the story of Edward Snowden starting from the time he enlisted in the US army. In this 2 hour feature, they explore the events leading up to the release of classified information on the National Security Agency's various surveillance programs.

== Cast ==
- Kevin Zegers as Edward Snowden
- Michael Shanks as Glenn Greenwald
- Carmen Aguirre as Laura Poitras

== Funding & Cancellation ==
Classified: The Edward Snowden Story was financed via crowdfunding on the popular website Kickstarter and was scheduled to be released under the creative commons licence for free on September 19, 2014 via The Pirate Bay. In January 2014 the producers announced that "Classified" would be split into two separate projects one titled "Vulnerability", a documentary that focuses on IT security and the internet. The second, a feature film based on Snowden's life that would be produced in cooperation with likeminded production companies and film distributors in the near future. In January 2014 existing backers from "Classified" had the option to transfer their donations to "Vulnerability" or have the funds fully refunded. "Vulnerability" began filming in Vancouver, British Columbia on March 10, 2014.
