= Bernhard Elsner =

High-ranking East German secret police officer

- Born: 30 January 1927; Königsberg, Weimar Republic
- Died: 24 July 2017 (aged 90)
- Education: Friedrich Engels Military Academy; Ryazan Higher Military Automotive Engineering School
- Military career
- Allegiance: Nazi Germany (1944-1945); German Democratic Republic (1951-1990)
- Branch: German Army; Ministry for State Security
- Service years: 1944-1945; 1951-1990
- Rank: Major General
- Commands: Felix Dzerzhinsky Guards Regiment

Bernhard Elsner (30 January 1927 – 24 July 2017) was a Major general in the East German Ministry for State Security (Stasi). During the course of a long career with the quasi-military ministry, between 1972 and 1987 he was Commander of the Felix Dzerzhinsky Guards Regiment.

== Life ==
Bernhard Elsner was born in Königsberg, the capital of East Prussia which at that time was part of Germany. His father was a coachman. When he was six the Nazi Party took power in Germany. By the time he was thirteen war had resumed. He attended middle school locally before undertaking a traineeship, between 1941 and 1944, as a machine fitter. He undertook his National Labour Service in 1944 and then, towards the end of the year, volunteered for military service. He was captured in 1945 and spent 1945 to 1949 in a Soviet prisoner of war camp.

By the time of his release his home region had been subjected to a comprehensive ethnic cleansing programme and subsumed into Russia. Elsner settled further to the west, in what was now administered as the Soviet occupation zone, where he joined the People's Police. Towards the end of 1949 the occupation zone was relaunched as the German Democratic Republic (East Germany), a new separated German state with political and economic institutions consciously modelled on those of the Soviet Union. In 1950 Elsner joined the Socialist Unity Party ("Sozialistische Einheitspartei Deutschlands" / SED) which had been created four years earlier and was by now effectively consolidating its role as a new ruling party for a second German one-party dictatorship. During the next year, 1951, he joined the recently formed Ministry for State Security (Stasi), entering its prestigious "Adlershof Guards' Battalion" (later renamed as the "Felix Dzerzhinsky Guards Regiment"). In 1952 he was promoted to the rank of company commander. Five years later, relaunched in 1954 as the Felix Dzerzhinsky Guards Regiment, the former Adlershof Battalion had itself grown to the point where it comprised ten battalions along with various support companies: in 1957 Bernhard Elsner became Chief of Staff for the regiment's First Battalion.

Following a period of preparatory training, from 1958 to 1959 Elsner was in Moscow where he studied at the military institute. On his return he became Chief of staff for the Number 1 commando group, and in 1960 he became officer for military sciences in the Regimental Staff Group Number 1. In 1964 he became deputy commander of the Felix Dzerzhinsky Guards Regiment and in 1962 he became the regimental Chief of Staff.

Between 1965 and 1968 he attended the Friedrich Engels Military Academy in Dresden, emerging with a degree in military sciences. In 1971 he was promoted to the rank of colonel, and in 1972 he took over command of the Felix Dzerzhinsky Guards Regiment, succeeding Heinz Gronau. On 6 February 1976 the Chairman of the National Defense Council promoted Elsner to the rank of Major general. In 1987, after fifteen years in command of the regiment, he was transferred to the Ministry's Main Training Department, where he served as an officer for "special projects" ("Sonderaufgaben").

After the changes of 1989 and reunification which followed it, the old East German Ministry for State Security was dissolved and Elsner lost his job. He subsequently returned to prominence as the Chief Executive of the Community Initiative for the Protection of the Social Rights of former members of the East German Armed Services and Customs Administration ("Initiativgemeinschaft zum Schutz der sozialen Rechte ehemaliger Angehöriger bewaffneter Organe und der Zollverwaltung der DDR e. V." / ISOR). A principal focus is the protection of pension rights and entitlements earned before 1989.
