= Wieger StG-940 =

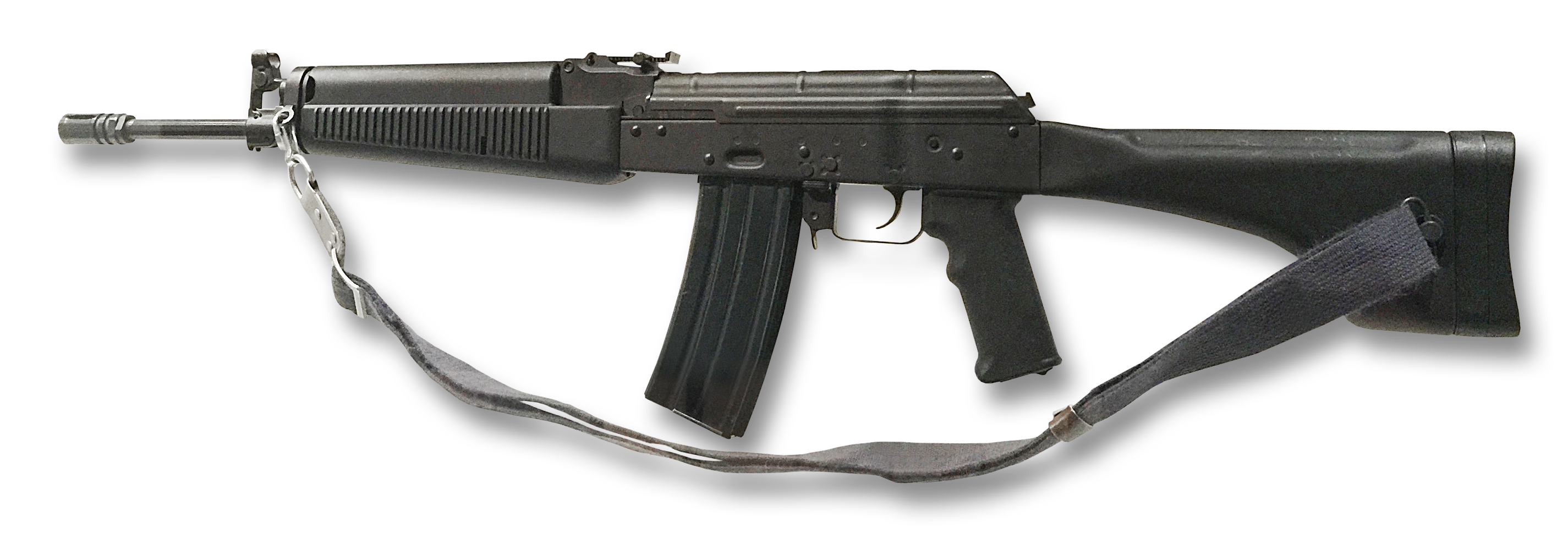
- StG-941
- Type: Assault rifle
- Place of origin: East Germany

Service history
- Used by: See Users

Production history
- Designed: 1981
- Manufacturer: VEB Geräte- und Werkzeugbau Wiesa
- Produced: 1988–1990
- Variants: See Variants

Specifications
- Mass: 6.6 lbs (3 kg)
- Length: 36.25 in (920.75mm)
- Cartridge: 5.56×45mm NATO
- Caliber: 5.56
- Action: Gas-operated
- Rate of fire: 600 rounds/min
- Feed system: 30-round box magazine
- Sights: Iron sights

The Wieger StG-940 was an East German series of assault rifles loosely based upon the Kalashnikov AK-74. The weapon was intended for export.

The brand name is a portmanteau of the words Wiesa (town of manufacture) and Germany.

== History ==
The weapon was tested but not officially adopted by the East German Army. It was conceived and developed from 1981 and produced between 1985 and 1990, during the final phase of East Germany's existence as a state. This was based on licensing agreements that the USSR and East Germany agreed to in 1981. The StG rifles were manufactured at the VEB Gerate-und Sonderwerkzeugbau Wiesa factory. Plans were made to produce 200,000 StGs annually.

Before the Berlin Wall collapsed, East Germany was in need of foreign currency. This gave the East German government the idea to develop and market the StG rifles.

After the two Germanies were unified in 1990, the factories involved in production of the StG-940s were closed as they were not interested in further marketing small arms of the former East German government. Any working models were promptly sold off to surplus markets overseas. Some were destroyed in 1992. Orders made by India and Peru were rendered invalid and the new German government agreed to pay penalty fees due to the cancellation of contracts.

It was reported that Federal Intelligence Service agents removed confidential files related to the StG rifles in 1993 without sharing the information to the rest of the German government. This came after Mitteldeutscher Rundfunk aired a report by Andreas Wolter, who was looking for more information from East German government files.

== Design ==
The StG-940's design is based on the AK-74, albeit modified. This was done to evade restrictions placed on East German assault rifle production of their AK-74 variants imposed in order to prevent competition against the Soviets based on their licensing agreement to not export any AK-74s made in East German soil abroad.

The rifles can be equipped with a bayonet.

== Variants ==
- StG-941: Assault rifle with fixed stock.
- StG-942: Assault rifle with folding stock and regular barrel.
- StG-943: Assault rifle with folding stock and short barrel.
- StG-944: Light machine gun version.
- STG-214: is a Cugir Romania manufactured semi-auto clone imported by Inter Ordnance, North Carolina. Sometimes known as the STG-2000C and StG-2003-C, chambered in 7.62×39mm. According to IO representatives, they used StG rifles already in the market as a basis for creating their clone rifle without seeing any blueprints.

== Users ==
- East Germany: Reports of the StG-943 were used by Stasi forces. According to former FBI agent Ralph Hope, the Felix Dzerzhinsky Guards Regiment are the only confirmed users of the 943.
- India: Ordered unknown amount for the Indian military. Around 7,500 StG-94s delivered before contracts were cancelled.
- Peru: Ordered unknown amount for Peruvian National Police in 1989. Around 2,000 StG-942s delivered before contracts were cancelled.
