= Henry Deringer =

American gunsmith and inventor (1786–1868)

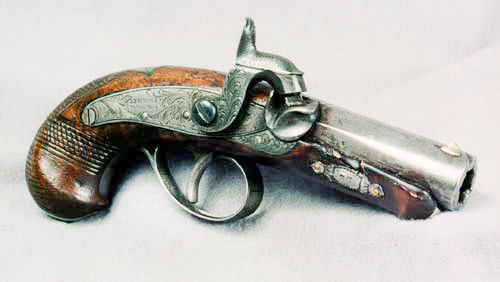
- The Philadelphia Deringer used in Lincoln's assassination
- Born: October 26, 1786; Easton, Pennsylvania, U.S.
- Died: February 28, 1868 (aged 81); Philadelphia, Pennsylvania, U.S.
- Resting place: Laurel Hill Cemetery
- Occupations: Gunsmith; inventor; businessman
- Known for: Derringer
- Spouse: Elizabeth Hollobush (m. 1810)
- Children: 4
- Father: Henry Deringer Sr.

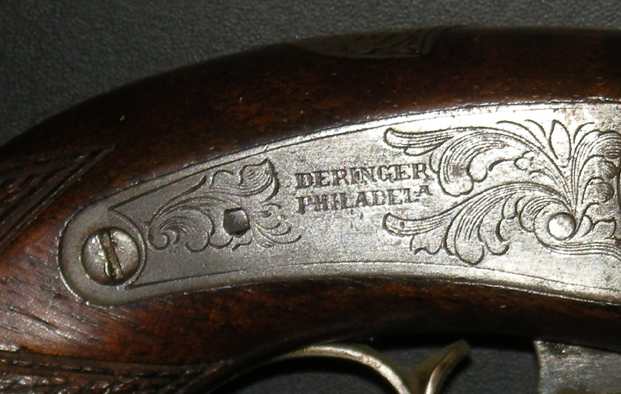
A derringer pistol. The inscription reads DERINGER/PHILADEL[PHI]^{A}.

Henry Deringer (October 26, 1786 – February 28, 1868) was an American gunsmith, inventor, and businessman. He is best known as the eponymous inventor of the derringer, a type of small handgun.

== Early life ==
Henry Deringer was born in Easton, Pennsylvania, on October 26, 1786, to Henry Deringer Sr. (1756–1833) and Catherine McQuety (1759–1829).

The family moved to Philadelphia, where his father continued work on the Kentucky rifle, developing both an ornate sporting model and a basic version for the United States Army. He sent his son to Richmond, Virginia, to apprentice with another gunsmith there.

Henry Deringer moved back to Pennsylvania after serving his apprenticeship and set up shop in 1806 in Philadelphia.

== Work ==
Deringer's early efforts were for military contracts, producing military pistols, muskets, and rifles. Among those he produced were the Model 1814 Common Rifle and the Model 1817 Common Rifle. He produced trade rifles, designated for the Native American tribes, to fulfill United States treaty obligations. His specialties became fine sporting rifles and dueling pistols, and he stopped pursuing government contracts by the mid-1840s.

In 1825, he designed the first of the large-caliber, short-barreled pistols that would become known as derringers (originally Philadelphia Deringers) and earn him considerable wealth and fame. Using the basic flintlock action common at the time, the pistols were muzzle-loading single-shots or, in some cases, double-barreled in an over-under manner.

Later models used the percussion cap action, although models with both actions were manufactured and sold for some time. For arms of Deringer's own design, he adopted newer percussion cap technology, placing his pistol at the cutting edge of firearms. He perfected the percussion cap by about 1820 and was marketing them by the 1830s and possibly as early as the mid-1820s.

== Name and trademark ==
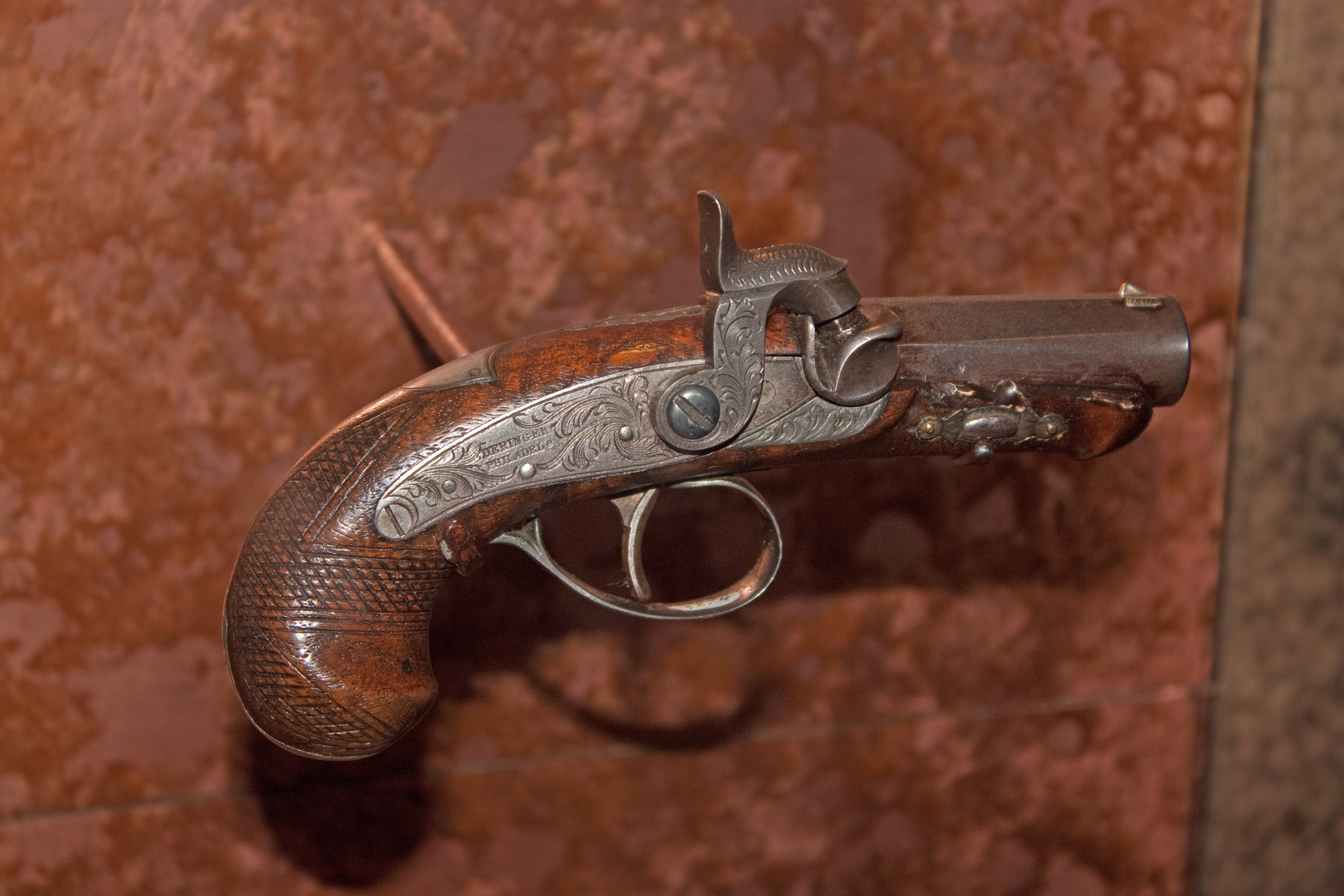
The Philadelphia Deringer used by John Wilkes Booth in Lincoln's assassination

Deringer never claimed a patent for his pistols, and the public bought them as fast as he produced them. Further development and copying of his design resulted in the generic derringer pistol that was manufactured widely by other companies.

There was widespread copying of his designs, including outright counterfeiting, with even his proofmarks being copied. One company even hired a tailor named John Deringer so that it could put the Deringer name on its firearms. Some of Deringer's workmen also left the company to set up their own duplicates, while others copied his pistols as closely as possible, with some even using its Deringer name and trademark. Deringer fought these infringements for most of his business life. The Deringer v. Plate ruling, in which the California Supreme Court ruled in the company's favor, became a landmark in trademark law.

== Personal life and death ==
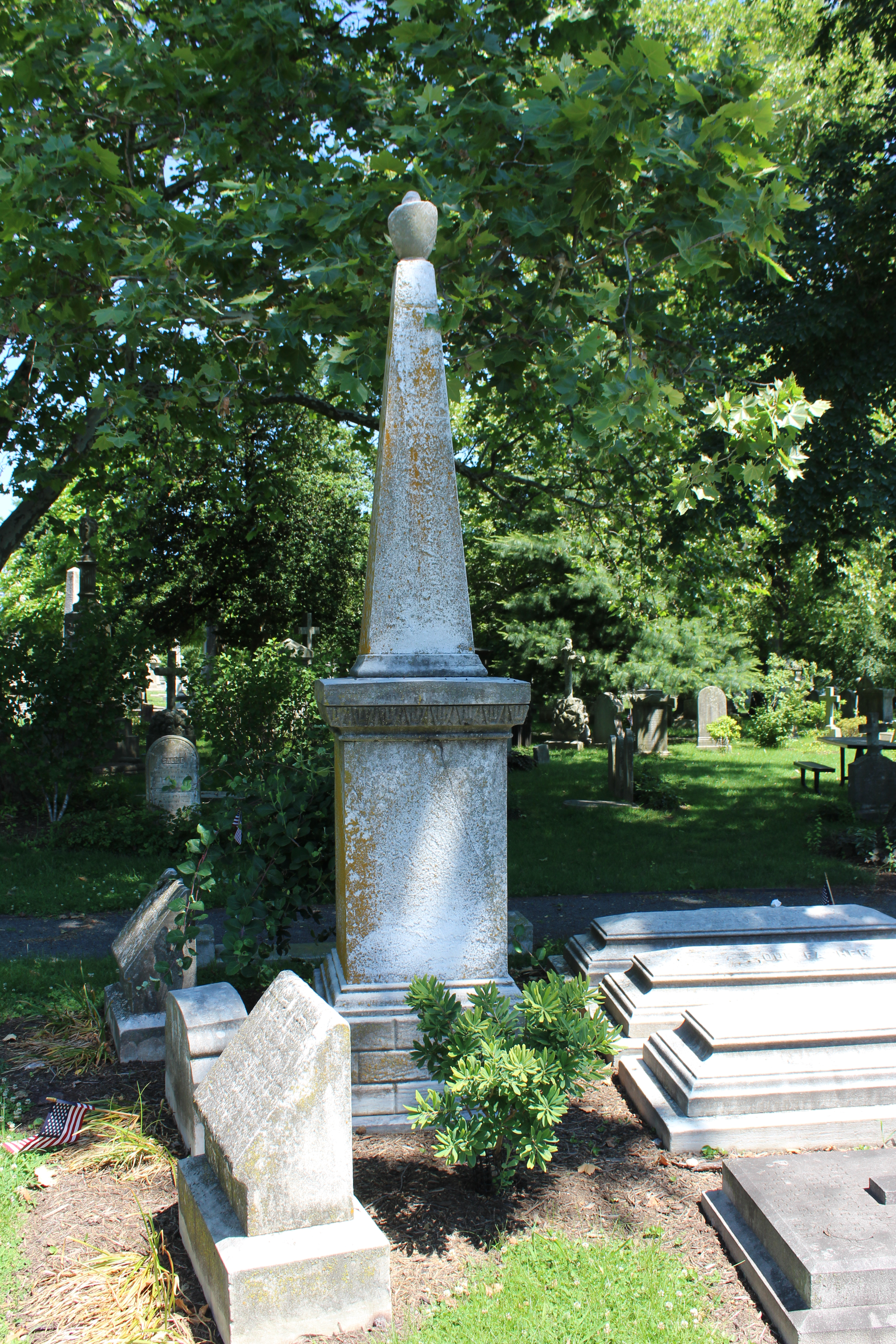
Deringer's tombstone in Laurel Hill Cemetery

Henry Deringer married Elizabeth Hollobush at the First Reformed Church in Philadelphia on April 5, 1810. They had three sons and a daughter: Theophilus T. Deringer (1811–1874), Bronaugh McClain Deringer (1819−1868), Calhoun Mason Deringer (1824−1907), and Eliza Deringer (1831–1907).

Deringer died in Philadelphia on February 28, 1868, at the age of 81. He is buried in Laurel Hill Cemetery.
