= Aaron Doering =

American educator, explorer, and author

Aaron Doering (born 1971 in Good Thunder, Minnesota) is an American explorer, writer, public speaker, and adventure learning pioneer. He was a full professor at the University of Minnesota until 2019, and the director and co-founder of the Learning Technologies Media Lab. Doering is a laureate of the humanitarian Tech Awards, and was a fellow for the University of Minnesota Institute on the Environment. He is also a fellow for the Royal Canadian Geographical Society.

== Biography ==
=== Early life ===
Raised on a farm in southern Minnesota, Doering's early ties to the land fueled a lifelong passion for the environment and for education. He studied geography and worked as a middle school teacher prior to obtaining his PhD in Learning Technologies, and from there moved on to teach, design online learning experiences, and conduct research at the postsecondary level. Doering has shared that he believes our personal actions have a huge impact on our environment and that we need to be cognizant of how we're all interconnected.

=== Expeditions ===
Doering has delivered free online education programs with a focus on STEM, geography and GIS, climate change, and global cultures to students worldwide through adventure learning programs such as the Changing Earth (begun in 2016 and ongoing), Arctic Transect 2004, the GoNorth! Adventure Learning Series (2006–2010), Earthducation (2010–2014), and North of Sixty° (2013).

Doering has been on a number of education-related dogsledding and pulling expeditions throughout the Arctic region at least annually since 2004. These expeditions have taken him across many regions of the circumpolar Arctic, including the Northwest Territories and Nunavut in Canada; Fennoscandia; Greenland; Chukotka in Russia; and the Arctic National Wildlife Refuge in Alaska, USA.

In addition to expeditions in the Arctic, Doering has traveled to climate hotspots around the globe as part of the Earthducation project. Earthducation is centered on studying intersections between education and sustainability by working together with individuals, communities, and organizations worldwide to create an ecological narrative of educational beliefs. To date, Doering and the Earthducation team have traveled to Burkina Faso, Africa (2011); northern Norway in Europe (2011); Australia (2012); Peru and Chile in South America (2012); Alaska, USA, and the Baffin Island, Nunavut, Canada, in North America (2013); and Nepal, Asia (2014). The final Earthducation expedition took the team to Antarctica.

=== Adventure learning ===
Adventure learning (AL) is a hybrid distance education approach defined by Doering in 2006. AL provides students with opportunities to explore real-world issues through authentic learning experiences within collaborative online learning environments and is anchored in experiential and inquiry-based learning. It includes educational activities that work in conjunction with the authentic experiences of researchers in the field. For example, within an AL program, the curriculum, the experiences and observations of the researchers, and the online collaboration and interaction opportunities for participating learners are delivered synchronously so that learners are able to make connections between what is happening in the real world and their studies, and then reflect on those events and present potential solutions to issues that are raised.

=== Other research & projects ===
Doering's academic writing focuses on how adventure learning impacts the classroom experience; on designing and developing online learning environments; on the use of GIS in the K12 classroom; and on K-12 technology integration. He's published journal articles, book chapters, and conference proceedings, and is co-author of the textbook Integrating Educational Technology into Teaching, and co-editor of The New Landscape of Mobile Learning: Redesigning Education in an App-based World. He has worked on projects including EarthXplorers, WeExplore, and North of Sixty°.

Doering along with his North of Sixty° team trekked 238 km from Arctic Bay to Pond Inlet on skis and snowshoes. A project of the Adventure Learning program, the goal was to find how are the people coping up with the climate change in the North and on what levels it is getting affected. It was.

The now-defunct program, AgCultures, was pitched as an adventure learning program on agriculture and food science. Teachers would have had access to a free online STEM curriculum, funded by CHS. In October 2020, in an article headlined "Donors Pull Support for U of M after Professor Spending Scandal", KSTP News reported that "CHS confirmed it discontinued support for Doering's educational research project, called AgCultures, after it learned of misspending." The same news report "uncovered expense reports that showed Aaron Doering charged the university for tens of thousands of dollars in personal expenses and listed romantic partners as 'consultants' on expensive trips around the world."

=== Learning Technologies Media Lab ===
In 2010, Doering and two of his colleagues at the University of Minnesota, Charles Miller and Cassandra Scharber, founded the Learning Technologies Media Lab, with the support of the College of Education and Human Development. The mission of LTML is to create and inspire opportunities for global collaboration in addressing humanity's most pressing educational, social, and environmental issues by designing and evaluating innovative technology-mediated solutions for learners, educators, researchers, and organizations. Doering resigned his position while "under investigation for questionable spending of taxpayer money at the university," according to a news article from November 13, 2019.

== Personal life ==
On December 26, 2018, Doering was arrested at the home of his girlfriend and charged with two felony counts of domestic assault by strangulation. In February 2019, during Doering's trial, the prosecution brought two other women forward as witnesses, his ex-wife and a former fiancé, to confirm Doering's history of abuse. Public records include a police report filed against him for strangulation and battery by the fiancé one year prior. On April 17, 2019, Doering pled guilty and in June 2019 was sentenced to serve 180 days in the Hennepin County jail. At his sentencing, Doering said, "I've struggled with my relationships and my sobriety. It's culminating with me being here, sitting amongst my mistakes." On November 13, 2019, it was announced that Doering had resigned from his post at the University of Minnesota.

== Awards & honors ==
- Fellow, Royal Canadian Geographical Society
- Bonnie Westby-Huebner Endowed Chair of Education and Technology, University of Minnesota.
- Tech Laureate of the Tech Museum Awards: Technology Benefitting Humanity, San Jose, California.
- Institute on the Environment Fellow, University of Minnesota.
- TEDx Speaker, 2012.
- Marty and Jack Rossmann Award, College of Education and Human Development, University of Minnesota.
- Community and Outreach Engagement Faculty Award, College of Education and Human Development. University of Minnesota.

== Select bibliography ==
- Roblyer, M. D., & Doering, A. (2013). Integrating Educational Technology into Teaching (6th edition). Boston: Allyn & Bacon.
- Miller, C., & Doering, A. (2014). The New Landscape of Mobile Learning: Redesigning Education in an App-based World. New York: Routledge.
