= Deringer (surname) =

Deringer is a German surname. It originates from either a personal name or toponym. Notable people with the surname include:

- Arved Deringer (1913–2011), German lawyer and politician
- Henry Deringer (1786–1868), American gunsmith, the son of Henry Deringer Sr.
- Henry Deringer Sr. (1756–1833), American gunsmith, the father and mentor of Henry Deringer Jr.

== See also ==
- Derringer (surname)
