= Hans-Wilhelm Doering-Manteuffel =

- Born: 17 July 1898; Golina, German Empire
- Died: 21 January 1963 (aged 64); Stuttgart, West Germany
- Military career
- Allegiance: German Empire (to 1918); Weimar Republic (to 1933); Nazi Germany
- Branch: Luftwaffe
- Service years: 1916–1945
- Rank: Generalmajor
- Commands: 20th Flak Division; 15th Flak Division
- Conflicts: World War II
- Awards: Knight's Cross of the Iron Cross

Hans-Wilhelm Doering-Manteuffel (17 July 1898 – 21 January 1963) was a general in the Luftwaffe of Nazi Germany during World War II. He was a recipient of the Knight's Cross of the Iron Cross.

== Awards and decorations ==
- Knight's Cross of the Iron Cross on 10 September 1944 as Generalmajor and commander of 101st Flak Regiment

Military offices
Preceded by Oberst Dr. Hermann Rudhart	Commander of 20th Flak Division; 30 October 1944 - 19 January 1945	Succeeded by Generalmajor Theodor Herbert
Preceded by Oberst T. Peters	Commander of 15th Flak Division; 20 January 1945 - 8 May 1945	Succeeded by None
