= Tamara Doering =

American microbiologist

- Spouse: Michael Brent

Academic background
- Education: Johns Hopkins University; Johns Hopkins School of Medicine
- Doctoral advisor: Paul Englund Gerald Hart

Academic work
- Discipline: Microbiology
- Sub-discipline: Glycobiology Mycology
- Institutions: Washington University School of Medicine

Tamara Lea Doering is an American microbiologist known for her research in Cryptococcus neoformans, a pathogenic fungus, as well as earlier work on GPI anchors. She is currently the Alumni Endowed Professor of Molecular Microbiology at Washington University School of Medicine.

== Early life and education ==
Doering's father taught chemistry at Johns Hopkins University, while her mother was a "sociologist in academia and government." She moved to Baltimore at age 5 and attended "excellent" schools in the Baltimore, Maryland area.

Doering earned her bachelor's degree with honors from Johns Hopkins University in 1983. She completed the Medical Scientist Training Program at Johns Hopkins School of Medicine, earning her MD PhD in 1991. Under the supervision of Paul Englund and Gerald W. Hart, she conducted her doctoral research on the biosynthesis of GPI anchors in African trypanosomes.

== Career and research ==
After receiving her MD and PhD degrees, Doering continued her training as a postdoctoral fellow at the University of California, Berkeley with Randy Schekman, where she studied the intracellular transport of GPI-anchored proteins in the model yeast Saccharomyces cerevisiae.

In 1997, Doering became an Assistant Professor of Pharmacology at Cornell University Medical College. In 1999, she joined the faculty of Washington University School of Medicine. Doering became a Professor of Molecular Microbiology in 2011. Currently, she is the Alumni Endowed Professor of Molecular Microbiology at the Washington University in St. Louis.

Doering's research focuses on the fundamental biology and host interactions of Cryptococcus neoformans, a pathogenic fungus that primarily causes meningoencephalitis in immunocompromised individuals. One focus of research in her lab is the polysaccharide capsule which surrounds the surface of C. neoformans and is the main cryptococcal virulence factor. In the general area of glycobiology, her group also studies synthesis of the capsule and cell wall, the regulation of capsule synthesis, and other glycosyltransferases.

The Doering lab further studies host interactions of C. neoformans, which has led to investigations of intracellular sterol traffic, protein palmitoylation, and regulation of secretion. The group also examines Cryptococcus neoformans at the genomic level, including the examination of clinical variants that influence virulence.

== Personal life ==
Doering enjoyed her time in the San Francisco Bay Area "with no family commitments" and later chose to delay having children during what she considered to be the "few key years" when she was establishing herself in her field. She is committed to the advancement and support of women in science, and her encounters with the "strict hierarchy and gender bias" of medical training in the 1980s at Johns Hopkins left her determined to promote safe and fair environments in research for all trainees. Even as late as 2019, Doering noted that "There are still double standards in academia about men and women."

== Awards and honors ==
- Fellow, American Academy of Microbiology (2013)
- Fellow, American Association for the Advancement of Science (2010)
- Member, American Society for Clinical Investigation (2005)
- President, Academic Women’s Network of Washington University School of Medicine (2015-2016)
- External Advisory Committee, National Center for Functional Glycomics (2014 - )
- Alumni Endowed Professorship, Washington University School of Medicine (2013 - )
- Advisory Committee, Burroughs Wellcome Fund Career Awards for Medical Scientists (2011-2019)
- Steering Committee, Consortium for Functional Glycomics (2007-2012)
- Advisory Board Member, European Consortium for Fungal Cell Wall (2005-2008)
- Mentor Award, Academic Women’s Network (2004)
- Craig Faculty Fellowship, Washington University School of Medicine (2000-2005)
- Burroughs Wellcome New Investigator Award in Molecular Pathogenic Mycology (2000-2003)
- Burroughs Wellcome Career Award in the Biomedical Sciences (1996-2000)
- Miller Institute Fellowship Award for Basic Research in Science (1993-1995)
- National Institutes of Health Postdoctoral Fellowship Award (1993)
