= Dorin Genpo =

German Buddhist priest and convicted child molester (born 1955)

Oshō Dorin Genpo
- Born: Hans Rudolf Döring; April 25, 1955 (age 71); Altötting, Bavaria, West Germany
- Other names: Genpo Döring; Genpo H. R. Döring
- Criminal charges: Severe child molestation x25
- Criminal penalty: 7 years and 9 months imprisonment
- Criminal status: Incarcerated
- Children: 3

Religious life
- Religion: Buddhism
- Sect: Mahayana
- Ordination: 1992

Hans Rudolf Döring (born 25 April 1955), better known as Dorin Genpo (Japanese: 道輪玄峰), is a German Buddhist priest.

== Early life ==
Döring was born in Altötting to a Catholic family. His father was sexually abusive and he first began doubting his birth religion at age nine. After the death of his father and remarriage of his mother, he left home at age 15 to work as an apprentice at a hotel in Munich. He worked as a police officer in Bavarian State Police's Bereitschaftspolizei between 1974 and 1978.

== Religion ==
Döring began practising Zen in 1977 and travelled to Japan to study at various temples. In 1985, Döring became a disciple under Zen master Genshō Hōzumi and in 1988, he founded Hakuin-Zen-Gemeinschaft e.V. in Munich. In 1990, Döring finished his studies under Hōzumi, becoming unsui and receiving the name Dorin Genpo.

The following year, he joined the monastery Empuku-ji in Kameoka, Kyōto, where he tutored under Nishikata Tansetzu Roshi. In 1992, he was fully ordained as oshō and received a teaching certification. Döring settled in Dinkelscherben, where he founded the Buddhist temple Bodaisan Shoboji ("Mount of Enlightenment, temple for the sincere worship of the Three Jewels"), heading religious education for prospective Zen teachers. By the time he moved there, he was married and had three children.

Döring was regarded as one of Germany's most prominent Buddhist clerics for his efforts to engaged Buddhism. He was frequently featured in magazines advocating for interreligious dialogue, particularly to his former Catholic faith. Döring was a board member of the Deutsche Buddhistische Union between 1985 and 2008, after which he retained an honorary seat, and one of fifteen Vice Presidents of the World Fellowship of Buddhists. He also organized trips to pilgrimage sites in Japan and invited practitioners of sadō and shodō to Germany. Döring was a frequent guest at Augsburg's "Round Table of Religions" and was responsible for the city receiving a peace award from South Korea. Additionally, Döring was active in local politics, as a board member and local councillor in Augsburg-Lechhausen for the Social Democratic Party of Germany.

In late 2011, Döring was briefly a suspect in the murder of a police officer in Augsburg, but exonerated when a pair of brothers were arrested and tried for the killing.

After suffering a near-fatal heart attack in June 2016, Döring elected to step back from some offices related to his religious duties.

== Child molestation ==
Starting at least 2001, Döring groomed and molested seven pre-teen boys over a 15-year period. He had met the victims, aged 4 to 13 at the time of the abuse, through refugee centres or counselling sessions. The first victim was a 13-year-old boy who had Döring as his spiritual advisor to overcome substance abuse. An 11-year-old boy who had arrived from Chechnya during the 2015 refugee crisis was molested during breathing exercises and had been facing deportation along with his mother since then. The youngest and most recent victim was Döring's 4-year-old grandnephew. Many of the victims' mothers, who included Döring's adult niece, had reached out to Döring as a grief counsellor following the deaths of their husbands. Some victims described being "seduced" by Döring who had inserted himself into their lives as a replacement father figure. He injured at least one child's genitals during a sexual assault and collected around 2800 images/videos depicting the boys nude and/or engaged in sexual acts; around 2000 digitalised files were classed as child pornography while another 800 were classed as youth/adolescent pornography. During the same timeframe, Döring pursued several extramarital affairs with both men and women, including some of the mothers of the children he abused.

=== Arrest ===
In July 2016, a mother reported Döring to Kripo, saying her 11-year-old son had accused Döring of repeated oral rape perpetrated against him and his brother. Döring was arrested on the morning of 27 July 2016 and issued a full confession.

=== Trial and sentencing ===
In 2017, Döring was tried at the youth chamber of Landesgericht Augsburg and charged with 25 counts of serious child molestation per Strafgesetzbuch § 176. A court psychiatrist assessed that Döring had "paedophilic tendencies", but that he was evidently also attracted to adults of either sex. Döring pleaded guilty, voiced regret for his crimes, and offered to pay a total of €35,000 as compensation. His attorney asked for leniency, citing his client's own past of being sexually abused, and that he be given a maximum sentence of six years imprisonment rather than nine years imprisonment as wanted by the prosecution. Judge Lenart Hoesch rejected the argumentation, saying although Döring appeared genuinely remorseful, he had severely downplayed the abuse before his trial and that in his initial police interrogation, he claimed that he had wanted to "help" the victims and that they never told him to stop. On 8 July 2017, Döring was found guilty of all charges and sentenced to seven years and nine months imprisonment, after which he unsuccessfully filed for revision.

Following the verdict, Hakuin-Zen-Gemeinschaft and the Deutsche Buddhistische Union issued official responses offering condolences to the victims and condemning Döring's actions.

== See also ==
- Hans Schmidt
- Sangharakshita
- Eido Shimano
- Joshu Sasaki
- Ram Bahadur Bomjon
- Sogyal Rinpoche

== Bibliography ==
- Einführung in die Meditation (ISBN 3-934209-04-1)
- Was ist Zen? (ISBN 3-934209-09-2)
- Zen im Westen – westliches Zen (ISBN 3-934209-10-6)
- Mein Weg zum Zen (ISBN 3-934209-11-4)
