= Christian Döring (Bible publisher) =

Christian Döring (c. 1480 – after 1533) was a 16th-century figure of the Reformation, a wealthy goldsmith and one of the first publishers of the Bible in native German.

== Life ==
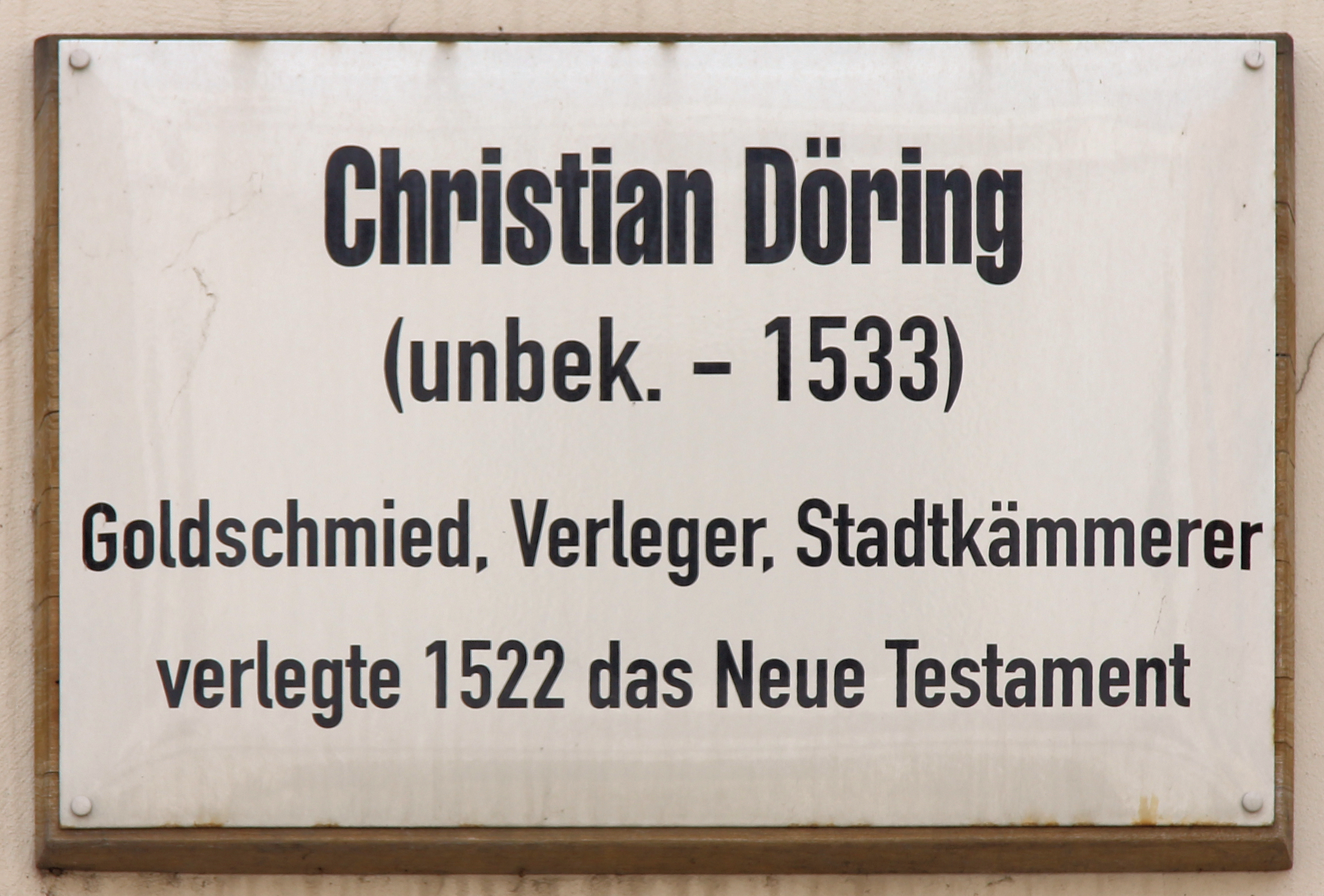
Plaque on 26 Schloßstraße Wittenberg

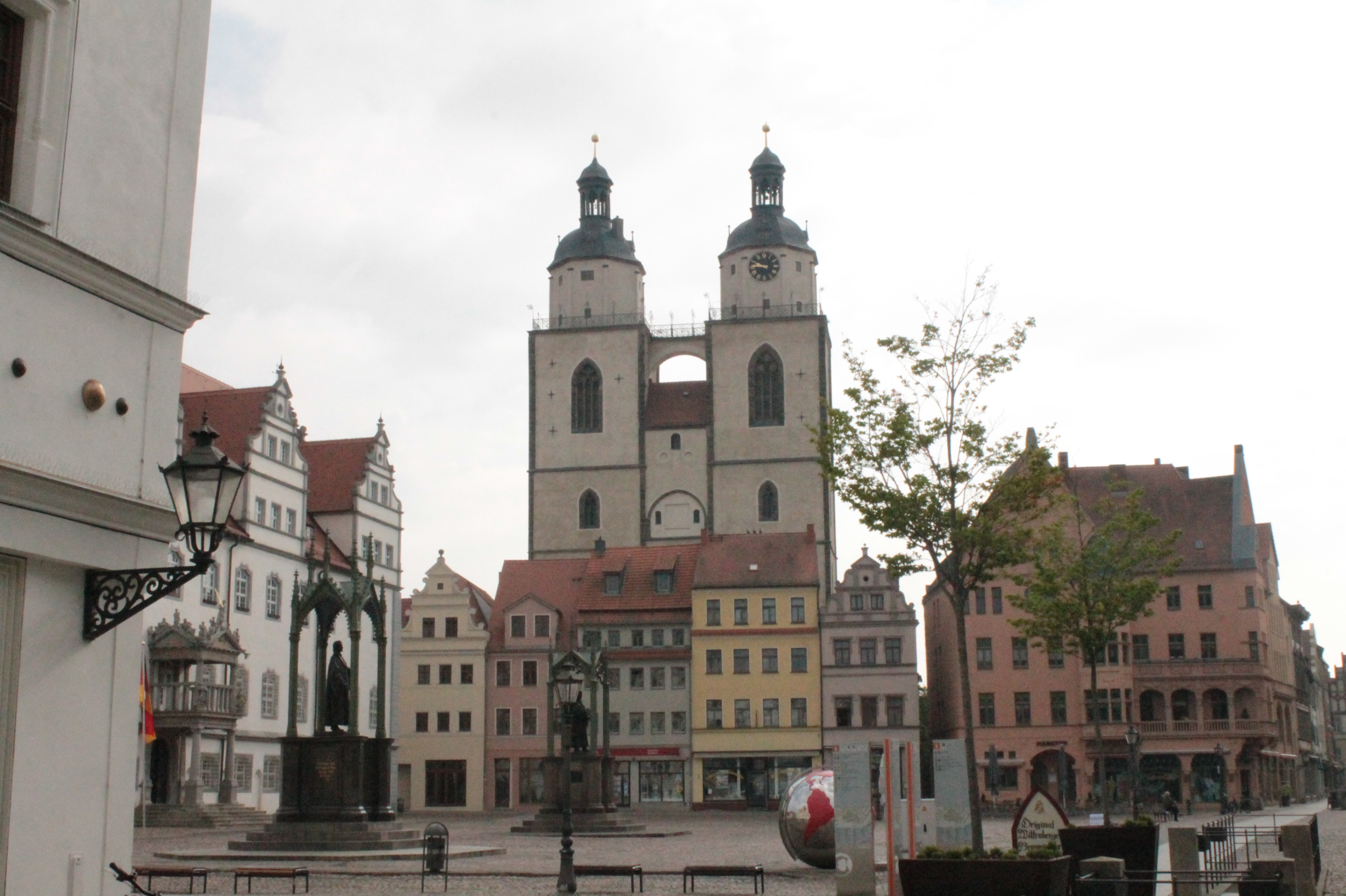
The marketplace in central Wittenberg

He was born in Frankfurt around 1480. In 1508 he successfully applied for citizenship in Berlin. In June 1508 he went to Altenburg, then decided to settle in Wittenberg (which was a centre of new thought at that time). He lived at 26 Schlossstrasse, close to the market. Here he befriended Lucas Cranach the Elder, who was a neighbour, as was Christoph Balzer. He set up shop as a goldsmith on the town marketplace. He was made city treasurer soon after arrival. Other friends included Thomas Muntzer, Philip Melanchthon and Johann Bugenhagen, all of whom became leading figures in the Reformation.

Martin Luther lived a little to the east and borrowed Döring's cart to undertake his famous trip to Worms in 1519. Due to this relationship, when Luther wrote the first translation of the Bible in German, Döring agreed to organise and pay for the printing, along with his friend, Lucas Cranach.

In September 1522 he printed and published the first Bible written in German: Luther's "September Testament". A pivotal point in the Reformation, the rapid demand for copies made him an even richer man. From 1523 Döring bought out Cranach's share to be the sole holder of the rights.

He last appears in Wittenberg on 14 December 1533, when the records declare him bankrupt. His house on Schlossstrasse was then occupied by Johann Schneidewein. He left Wittenberg in or before April 1534. He sold his rights to the printing of the Bible, leading to a new wave of printing in 1534.

== Family ==
He was married (by Martin Luther) to Barbara (d. 1564), granddaughter of Thomas von Blankenfelde, mayor of Berlin (d. 1504). Their daughter married Johann Schneidewein (1519-1568) who was a professor at the university. The couple lived in Döring's house on Schlossstrasse.

A second daughter, Margarethe, married George Reich who was one of the people persecuted in Wittenberg by Hans Kohlhase in 1536.

A third daughter, Martha, married Martin Luther, namesake of his famous uncle and family friend, Luther. Following his death she married the Zwickau musician Jodocus Schalreuter.

== Publications ==
- Luther's New Testament in German (September 1522) a.k.a. the September Testament
