= Heinz Gronau =

German communist resistance activist

Heinz Gronau (1 January 1912 – 28 October 1977) was a communist resistance activist during the years Hilter was in power. He was transferred to Buchenwald concentration camp in 1938. At the concentration camp he became a leading figure in the (covert and illegal) "International Buchenwald Military Organisation" ("Internationale Militärorganisation Buchenwald"). He survived the war and in 1946 joined the (semi-militarised) police service in the Soviet occupation zone of Germany. A succession of promotions followed. In 1966 he was promoted to the rank of Major general in the East German Felix Dzerzhinsky Guards Regiment. During the final years of his career he combined his overtly military posting with command of the National Department I ("Hauptabteilung I") at the Ministry for State Security ("Stasi"). The department was a specialist intelligence section of the ministry, tasked with attending to the intelligence needs of the ministry's armed units.

== Life ==
=== Early life ===
Heinz Gronau was born in Leipzig, where his father worked as a printer. He grew up and attended school locally, in nearby Treuen, and then, between 1926 and 1930, trained for work as a dental technician. By 1931 he was performing a leadership role with the local Young Communists. As he completed his apprenticeship European economies were experiencing the full backwash from the Wall Street crash, and Gronau spent the next three years unemployed. Meanwhile, in 1930 he joined the Communist Party. Until 1933 he served as a member of the Young Communists' regional leadership team for Saxony. Both before and after the Nazis took power Gronau participated in the German resistance to Nazism. In 1933 he was arrested and briefly detained in what at least one source refers to as "protective custody" four times. Meanwhile, between 1933 and 1935, as the unemployment situation improved, he was able to support himself through casual work between 1933 and 1935. Gronau was arrested again in 1935; this time there was no quick release. Instead he faced trial, charged with high treason. On conviction, he was sentenced to a thirty-month jail term.

=== Buchenwald ===
He completed his sentence at a prison in Zwickau in 1938, but instead of being released, he was now detained at the recently opened Buchenwald concentration camp near Weimar. Initially he was sent to work at the camp's "Electricians' Workshop". Later he was sent to join the electroplating section. Here he took part in covert resistance activities and worked in the "military section" of the "Internationale Militärorganisation Buchenwald" / IMO, a shadowy conspiratorial grouping of inmates with communist pasts, a significant number of whom would turn up after 1949 in positions of power and influence in the Soviet-sponsored German Democratic Republic (East Germany). Over the years the IMO acquired a considerable stockpile of weapons for future use. They also had access to significant supplies of effective poison, much of it in the form of gases acquired by Gronau in the electroplating workshops where he worked. Gronau was involved in constructing and installing secret radio transmitters and receivers. He was also among those who manufactured stabbing and cutting weapons for possible future use while in the camp.

=== Leipzig ===
The weapons store that the inmates had collected found a use on 11 April 1945 when Gronau participated in a "self-release" operation with other Buchenwald camp inmates. By this time, from the perspective of any guards who had not fled in response to the report of atrocities committed by the Red army advancing rapidly from the east, the camp was being evacuated by the German government, and there are reports of many thousand inmates being forced to join the evacuation marches, but Gronau appears not to have been among these. War ended, formally, during the first week of May 1945. Heinz Gronau made his way home to Leipzig, which had been liberated from National Socialism by US forces during April 1945. However, the leaders of the United States and Soviet Union had already agreed between them a post-war division of Germany whereby the whole of Saxony would be administered by the Soviet Union. In July 1945 US forces therefore withdrew from Leipzig and the surrounding region, leaving the city to which Gronau had returned administered as part of the Soviet occupation zone. During 1945/46 he was placed in charge of the city's social and youth welfare office.

=== Police service ===
It was only in 1946 – at least formally – that Gronau joined the quasi-military police service of the Soviet occupation zone (rebranded and relaunched in October 1949 as the German Democratic Republic / East Germany), taking charge of the local police stations at Rochlitz and Großenhain, small towns and regional administrative centres both located between Leipzig and Dresden. Promotion followed quickly. During or before 1948 he became the Dresden-based deputy head of the police authority for Saxony. It was also in 1948 that he undertook a course at the "Höhere Polizeischule" ("Higher Police Academy") in Berlin. Confirmation that those in charge had marked him out for fast track promotion (and of the quasi-military nature of the police service in the Soviet occupation zone (Note: One thing on which the Soviet and US leaderships had agreed in 1945 was that there should be no more German armies. Quite soon, governments in Moscow and Washington both modified their positions on this point, however. In the Soviet occupation zone (East Germany), when the National People's Army was established in 1956, it was based on the "Kasernierte Volkspolizei", a specialist police division by name; but already, by 1956, a national army in all but name.)) came at the end of the year: during 1948/49 Heinz Gronau took part in a special course in tank warfare at the specialist Рязанский военный автомобильный институт ("Military Institute for Motorised Transport") at Ryazan, a short distance to the southeast of Moscow.

=== Police-Stasi interface ===
In November 1950, promoted to the rank of "Inspector", Gronau was appointed to take charge of "Hauptabteilung I" The department was responsible for "defence and people's police preparedness/liaison", with the newly launched Ministry for State Security ("Stasi"). At the start of 1953 he was promoted, in respect of his police service position, to the rank of chief inspector: he continued to exercise the same set of responsibilities in respect of the burgeoning Ministry for State Security till 28 February 1953. In 1953 Gronau was raised to the rank of colonel and given command of the Blumberg Border Police unit. Further promotions within the border force followed. In 1957/58 he was appointed head of the border service department, and then deputy chief of staff to the [East] German Border Police Command, under the leadership of Helmut Borufka.

Between 1958 and 1962 Heinz Gronau attended the KGB Academy in Moscow, studying for a degree at the "Grenztruppen-Fakultät" ("Border Force Faculty"), and emerging with a "Diplom-Militärwissenschaftler" (loosely, "Military sciences") degree. In 1962 Gronau took over from Colonel Günter Wolf as commander of the MfS Guards Regiment (better remembered by the soubriquet it was granted in 1967, as the Felix Dzerzhinsky Guards Regiment), remaining in the post for a decade. It was a decade dur8ng which, in 1966, he received his final military promotion, this time to the rank of "Generalmajor" ("Major general").

=== Later years ===
Generalmajor retired in 1972, which was the year of his sixtieth birthday. He died on 28 October 1977. In a public tribute, the party central committee described him a "a passionate patriot and internationalist [and] a true friend of the Soviet Union".. (Note: "Unsere Partei trauert um einen Genossen, der unermüdlich seine ganze Kraft, seine revolutionären Erfahrungen und Fähigkeiten für den Aufbau und den Schutz des Sozialismus einsetzte. Er war ein glühender Patriot und Internationalist, ein treuer Freund der Sowjetunion ...".)Unsere Partei trauert um einen Genossen, der unermüdlich seine ganze Kraft, seine revolutionären Erfahrungen und Fähigkeiten für den Aufbau und den Schutz des Sozialismus einsetzte. Er war ein glühender Patriot und Internationalist, ein treuer Freund der Sowjetunion ...

== Personal ==
Sources on the private lives of leading East German political and military figures are generally silent about spouses and children. It may be because she lived to a good age, and was significantly younger than her husband, that Margit Gronau is a partial exception. Her burial records are unexpectedly informative. Dr. Margit Gronau was born in 1921 and died, more than a quarter century after reunification, in 2017. She had a university-level education, receiving a doctorate in 1968 from the Central Committee's "Institute for Social Sciences" (as it was known at that time) in Berlin. (Note: Margit Gronau's doctoral dissertation bore the title "Wissenschaftlich-technische Revolution und Wandlungen in der sozialökonomischen Stellung der betrieblichen Intelligenz im staatsmonopolistischen Kapitalismus" (loosely, "Academic and technical change and revolution in the socio-economic position of the industrially and commercially engaged intelligentsia under state monopoly capitalism".) The name "Margit" suggests that (unless she was born abroad) Margit Gronau's family probably came originally from northern Germany.

== Recognition (selection) ==
- 1955: Patriotic Order of Merit in bronze
- 1961: Patriotic Order of Merit in silver
- 1971: Patriotic Order of Merit in gold

In 1986 the 23rd "Polytechnic Secondary School" (today known as the "Gutenberg Secondary School") at Berlin-Hohenschönhausen was renamed as the "Heinz-Gronau-Oberschule".

In 1987, at a ceremony attended by Dr. Margit Gronau as well as Leipzig First Party Secretary Horst Schumann, the 23rd "Polytechnic Secondary School" in central Leipzig, was also renamed to honour Heinz Gronau.
