= DoubleTap derringer =

DoubleTap
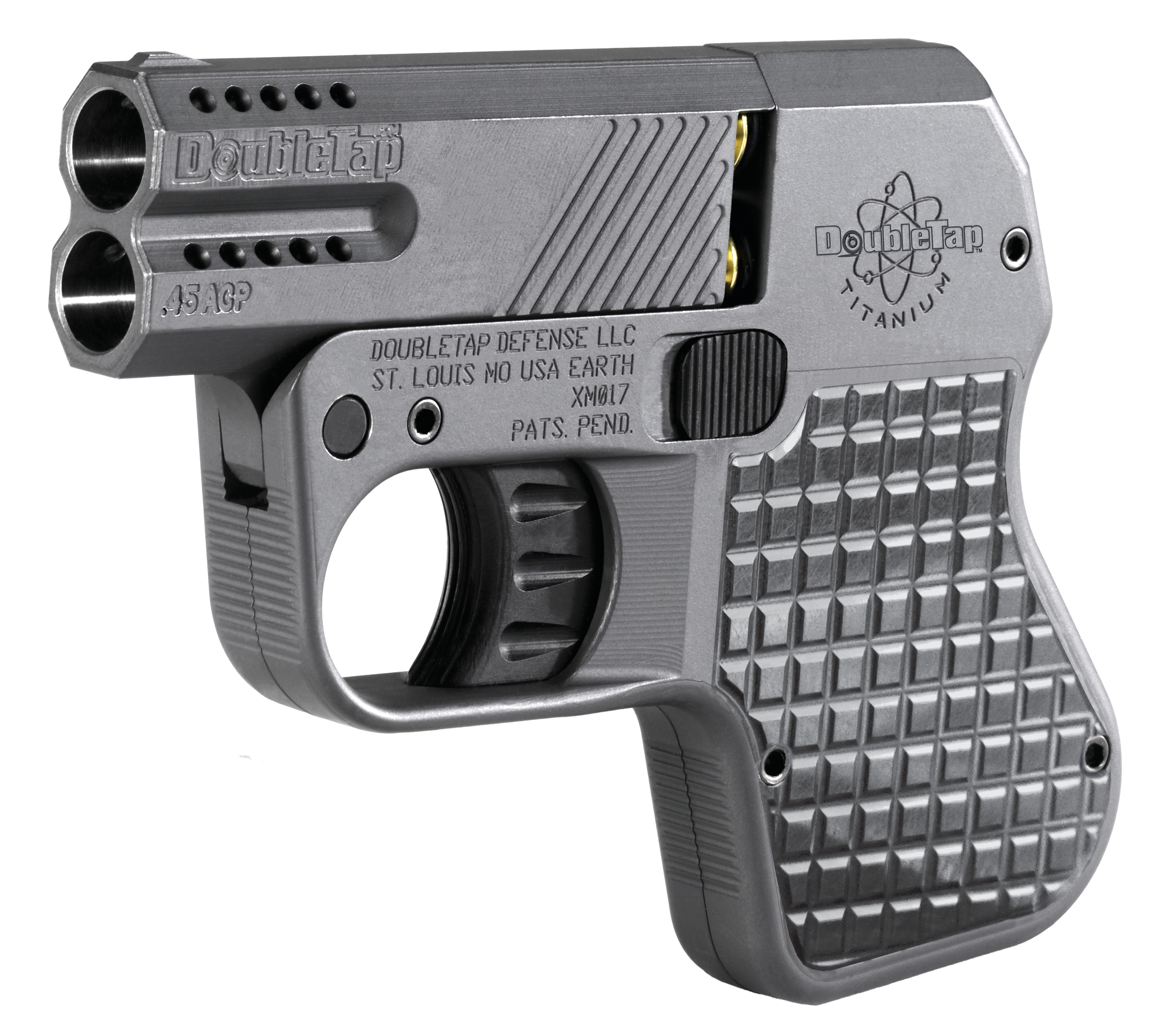
- DoubleTap derringer
- Type: Derringer
- Place of origin: United States

Production history
- Designer: Ray Kohout
- Designed: 2011
- Manufacturer: DoubleTap Defense, LLC
- Unit cost: $500 to $800 (USD)
- Produced: 2012–2013
- No. built: 23,000–25,000

Specifications
- Mass: 0.340 kg (0.75 lb)
- Length: 5.5 in (14 cm)
- Barrel length: 3 in (7.6 cm)
- Width: 0.665 in (1.69 cm)
- Height: 3.9 in (9.9 cm)
- Cartridge: 9×19mm.45 ACP
- Caliber: 9 mm.45
- Barrels: 2
- Action: DAO
- Sights: None

The DoubleTap derringer is a hammerless, double-action, double-barreled, large caliber derringer designed for personal protection and sold by DoubleTap Defense, LLC. It features stainless steel ported barrels and an aluminum frame that holds two extra rounds in the grip. The name comes from the double tap shooting technique in which two rounds are quickly fired before engaging the next target. Heizer Defense, the original manufacturer, has stated that the gun was inspired by the FP-45 Liberator pistol, which was designed for use in France by the resistance against the Germans during World War II.

== Design ==
The DoubleTap is distinctive for its two barrels, each carrying a chambered round. It also carries two additional rounds (on a 2-round Bianchi Speed Strip) in the grip which allow for reloading. An ambidextrous thumb latch releases the action but the pistol does not have ejectors; spent rounds must be manually removed if they do not fall free before the two backup rounds can be loaded.

The weapon features a patented double-action ball bearing trigger system. Additional features include a lightweight aluminum frame and a hammerless, no-snag design that make the DoubleTap easy carry and draw from a pant pocket, and also allows it to be fired through a coat or jacket pocket. Azimuth and DoubleTap planned a titanium-framed version, but it never entered production.

== Production ==
The DoubleTap was originally marketed under the name Heizer DoubleTap but in October 2012 DoubleTap Defense announced that they were looking for a new partner to manufacture the pistol. In a statement released on November 7, Heizer Defense stated that although they had "intended to develop a business relationship with Ray Kohout and Marvin Dufner; [...] that relationship never materialized". A month later, it was announced that Azimuth Technology in Naples, Florida had been selected to manufacture the pistol.

Early customers reported problems with "double strikes", a malfunction in the trigger system that would fire both barrels simultaneously. DoubleTap Defense ceased production in 2013, intending to develop a "Gen 2" design that would correct the issue, but financial problems and legal conflicts with Hornady and the unrelated DoubleTap Ammunition led the company to liquidate its remaining inventory and close its operations. No prototype of the "Gen 2" pistol was ever produced.
