= Travis Doering =

Canadian technology entrepreneur, systems analyst, writer and film producer

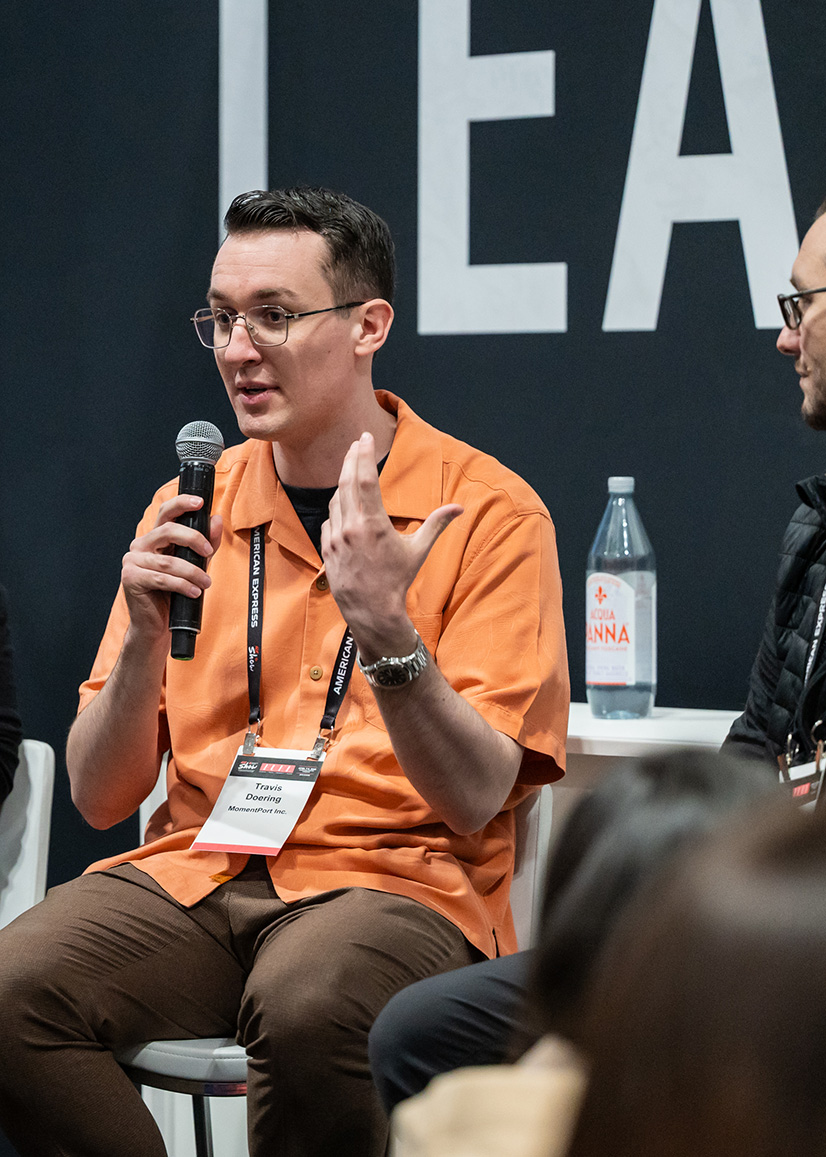
- Travis Doering speaking at The Tech & Trends Shaping Tomorrow (April 6, 2025)
- Born: July 14, 1991 (age 35); Vancouver, British Columbia, Canada
- Occupations: Technology entrepreneur, systems analyst, writer and film producer
- Years active: 2006–present

Travis Doering (/ˈdɔrɪŋ/; born July 14, 1991) is a Canadian technology entrepreneur who co-founded MomentPort and its AI telecommunication system, Ask JADA. At MomentPort, he serves as Chief Technology Officer. Before establishing MomentPort, Doering worked as a cybersecurity professional, and in the film industry as a writer and producer, specializing in creating content that raised awareness about cybersecurity.

== Business career ==
=== Ask JADA ===
In August 2024, MomentPort announced Ask JADA, an AI telecommunications system that had been in development since 2023.The system is designed to automate customer service functions, provide fraud prevention capabilities, and perform data analytics for business clients.

MomentPort also developed JADA Protect, which the company describes as a security suite for telecommunications systems. According to company materials, this includes features such as fraud analysis for inbound and outbound calls, DDoS protection, spam filtering, AI data validation, and password-protected lines. The system includes a feature called JADA Memory that stores customer information, which users can reportedly delete via voice commands. According to MomentPort, this storage system enables personalization of customer interactions based on stored preferences and past conversations while maintaining privacy. Ask JADA's training methodology reportedly involves recording conversations with human staff to enhance its AI models, along with gathering information from public sources like interviews, reviews, and social media.

=== MomentPort ===
MomentPort was co-founded by Doering and Lara Tiu in 2022, initially as a custom software development company. During this early phase, Doering spearheaded the company's custom software initiatives, building image-recognition systems for inventory tracking and secure payment integrations in the healthcare sector. The company underwent a strategic pivot toward AI-focused product development in 2023 when the company's first product Ask JADA went into stealth development.

== Security Research ==
Doering began his career working as a technical consultant and custom software developer providing information security consultancy services for high-risk individuals and businesses. In addition to his work in these fields, he has published many articles revealing security breaches and vulnerabilities leading to investigations by Forbes, The Washington Times, PC Magazine and among others.

=== BitDefender Breach (2015) ===
In July 2015, Doering published an article on a security breach at the antivirus maker BitDefender. The article revealed that a hacker known as "DetoxRansome" had extracted customer login credentials from BitDefender and demanded a $15,000 ransom to prevent the leak of a customer database. BitDefender acknowledged the breach and the company refused to pay the ransom, instead choosing to work with law enforcement to investigate the incident.

=== iCloud Vulnerabilities (2015) ===
In September 2015, Doering released a documentary titled "Vulnerability: The Secrets Behind iCloud Hacking" which Doering produced. The documentary exposed previously unknown vulnerabilities being exploited by an underground hacking collective known as RipSec, whose members breached over eleven thousand iCloud accounts, a significant portion of which belonged to Hollywood celebrities including Amanda Seyfried, Kate Mara, and Jamie Foxx.

=== NCIX Data Breach (2018) ===
In September 2018, Doering posted an editorial titled "NCIX Data Breach" on the blog of his then-cybersecurity company Privacy Fly. It outlined a severe data breach at bankrupt Canadian retailer NCIX in which millions of business records detailing 15 years' worth of transactions were sold in a series of backroom deals. Doering published substantial evidence including exposed credit cards, addresses, order histories, and employee social insurance numbers. The editorial prompted an investigation by the RCMP and Office of the Information and Privacy Commissioner of British Columbia, which resulted in the seizure of the servers being sold. However, by that time, most of the data had already been sold to overseas buyers.

=== Wings Restaurant Chain Hack (2024) ===
In January 2024, in a post on the company website for MomentPort, Doering identified and documented a security breach at Wings Restaurant Chain. His analysis revealed that threat actor TA569 had compromised the company's website to deliver malware through fake browser updates and unauthorized advertisements. Through technical investigation, Doering discovered obfuscated code that linked the attack to servers associated with known malicious actors TA569.

=== IYUNO Data Breach (2024) ===
In August 2024, MomentPort's security team led by Doering discovered a major leak of unreleased film and television content when monitoring software they had developed for a film industry client detected media files being shared online. Their investigation revealed that IYUNO, a media localization company serving major studios, had experienced a security breach. MomentPort's analysis determined the breach likely originated from an insecurely deployed API in IYUNO's content management system. Netflix subsequently confirmed the breach at their post-production partner and announced they were taking action to address the leaked content.

== Film and television ==
From 2012 until 2016, Doering served as a writer acting as a technical consultant for film and television productions providing hacking and information technology dialogue on several film and television productions including the Canadian science fiction series "Continuum", the police procedural "Motive" and the American zombie film "Dead Rising: Endgame". Before writing, Doering worked in casting and as an assistant director on many Canadian and American film and television productions.

== Edward Snowden movie ==
In September 2013, Doering and Film Director Jason Bourque set out to crowdfund a feature film titled "Classified: The Edward Snowden Story". "Classified" was a biographical feature film based on the life of NSA leaker Edward Snowden. In January 2014 production was shut down and the project was cancelled after losing several key donators due to not reaching their total 1.7 million dollar funding goal. When the production was shut down Bourque and Doering announced that "Classified" would be split into two separate projects, one titled "Vulnerability", a documentary that focuses on IT security and the internet. The second, a feature film based on Snowden's life that would be produced in cooperation with like-minded production companies and film distributors in the near future. In January 2014 existing backers from "Classified" had the option to transfer their donations to "Vulnerability" or have the funds fully refunded. "Vulnerability" was released on September 25, 2015.

== Filmography ==
=== Feature credits ===
Year	Title	Producer	Technical Consultant	Writer
2016	Dead Rising: Endgame		Yes	
2015	Vulnerability	Yes		Yes
2012	Skyfall		Yes	

=== Television credits ===
Year	Title	Producer	Technical Consultant	Writer
2012–2015	Continuum		Yes	
2013–2016	Motive		Yes	
2013	Hacked: Illusions of Security	Yes		
