= Carmen Aguirre =

Chilean-born Canadian actress

- Born: Chile
- Occupations: actor, writer, playwright

Carmen Aguirre is a Chilean-born Canadian actress and writer. She plays a prominent role in Endgame.

Early in her life, she lived and worked as a member of the Chilean Resistance. Carmen was raped by the "Paper Bag Killer" which was the alias of John Horace Oughton, a prolific sexual predator who assaulted more than 100 women and children between 1977 and 1985.

== Career ==
Her 2011 book Something Fierce: Memoirs of a Revolutionary Daughter was a memoir of her childhood, which she spent moving around regularly with her parents, who were part of the Chilean Resistance against Augusto Pinochet. The book was selected for the 2012 edition of CBC Radio's Canada Reads, defended by musician Shad; it was announced as the winner of the competition on February 9, 2012.

Aguirre has written over 20 stage plays to date, including In a Land Called I Don't Remember, Chile Con Carne, The Trigger and The Refugee Hotel. Her comments on "cancel culture" were published in Rungh Magazine.

In 2026, Aguirre endorsed Avi Lewis in that year's federal NDP leadership race.

== Filmography ==
=== Film ===
Year	Title	Role	Notes
1999	Convergence	Mrs. Sanchez	
2000	Best in Show	Taft Hotel Maid	
2001	The Shipment	Mexican Hooker #1	
2002	The Santa Clause 2	Spanish Teacher	
2003	My Boss's Daughter	Executive #1	
2006	Quinceañera	Aunt Silvia	
2018	Bella Ciao!	Constanza	

=== Television ===
Year	Title	Role	Notes
1999	The Outer Limits	Vagrant #1	Episode: "Blank Slate"
2000	Higher Ground	Juanita Ciceros	2 episodes
2000–2001	Da Vinci's Inquest	Various roles	5 episodes
2001	Trapped	Female Spectator	Television film
2001	Cold Squad	Elaine	Episode: "The Nanny"
2001–2002	Mary-Kate and Ashley in Action!	Voice	26 episodes
2002	Monk	Uniform Cop	2 episodes
2002	The Amazing Zorro	Dona Catalina	Television film
2003	The Wonderful World of Disney	Customer from Ecuador	Episode: "Phenomenon II"
2004	The L Word	Isabella Pernao	2 episodes
2004	Kingdom Hospital	Earl's Landlady	Episode: "Butterfingers"
2006	A Little Thing Called Murder	Sante 1966 cellmate	Television film
2006	Da Vinci's City Hall	Police Constable #1	Episode: "Bumped from the Ball"
2006	Home by Christmas	Principal	Television film
2007	Tin Man	Café Waitress	3 episodes
2010	A Trace of Danger	Housekeeper	Television film
2010–2011	V	Woman	2 episodes
2011	Endgame	Alcina Albeniz	13 episodes
2013	I Am Victor	Judge Franklin	Television film
2016	Supernatural	Coroner	Episode: "Love Hurts"
2017	The Drive	Camille	2 episodes
2018	Santa's Boots	Laurie	Television film
2021	Riverdale	Deanna Harper	Episode: "Fire in the Sky"
2022	Superman & Lois	Maryann Cushing	Episode: "Girl... You'll Be a Woman, Soon"
2025	Family Law	Zina Bayat	Episode: "Bass Fishing"

== Publications ==
- Carmen Aguirre (2010). The Refugee Hotel. Talonbooks. ISBN 9780889226500.
- Carmen Aguirre (2013). Something Fierce: Memoirs of a Revolutionary Daughter. Random House of Canada. ISBN 9780345813831.
- Carmen Aguirre (2013). Blue Box. Talonbooks. ISBN 9780889227576.
- Carmen Aguirre (2016). Mexican Hooker #1: And Other Roles Since the Revolution, Issue 1. Random House Canada. ISBN 9780345813848.
- Carmen Aguirre (2019). Chile Con Carne and Other Early Works. Talonbooks. ISBN 9781772012286.
