= Derringer (surname) =

Derringer is a German surname. It is a variant of Deringer. Notable people with the surname include:

- Robb Derringer (born 1967), American actor
- John Derringer (né Hayes; born 1962), Canadian radio personality
- Norm Derringer, common name of Norman W. Dieringer (1914–1997), American softball player
- Paul Derringer (1906–1987), American baseball player
- Rick Derringer, stage name of Richard Dean Zehringer (1947–2025), American guitarist, singer, and songwriter

== In fiction ==
- Matthew Derringer, character in the American comedy web series The Most Popular Girls in School
