= List of War of 1812 weapons =

List of weapons used during the War of 1812

This is a list of weapons used during the War of 1812.

== United Kingdom and the Canadas ==
=== Melee weapons ===
- Pattern 1796 infantry officer's sword
- Pattern 1796 light cavalry sabre
- 1803 Pattern British infantry sword
- 1805 Pattern Royal Navy officer's sword
- Boarding Pike
- Boarding Axe

=== Small arms ===
==== Muskets and rifles ====
- Brown Bess
- Baker rifle
- Musket Model 1777 (used by Canadian militia)
- Tulle musket (used by Canadian militia)
- Harpers Ferry Model 1803 (captured)

==== Pistols ====
- New Land Pattern Cavalry Pistol

==== Artillery ====
- 6-pounder smoothbore cannon
- 24-pounder long gun

== British allied tribes ==
=== Melee weapons ===
- Tomahawk
- Battle axe
- War club
- Red-painted war club (used by the Muscogee Creek of the Red Sticks faction)
- Spear

=== Small arms ===
==== Muskets and rifles ====
- Brown Bess (supplied by the British)
- Chief's Guns

== Spain ==
=== Small arms ===
==== Muskets and rifles ====
- M1752 Musket
- M1792 Musket
- Escopeta

== United States ==
=== Melee weapons ===
- Eagle Head Sword
- Model 1812 Cavalry Saber
- Starr Saber
- Virginia Manufactory Non-Commissioned Officer's Sword
- Infantry Pike
- Boarding Pike Type I
- Boarding Pike Type II
- Boarding Pike Type III
- Quarter Pike
- Type I Boarding Axe
- Type II Boarding Axe
- Type III Boarding Axe

=== Small arms ===
==== Muskets and rifles ====
- Springfield Model 1795
- US M1808/1812 service musket
- Harpers Ferry Model 1795
- Harpers Ferry Model 1803
- Model 1763 Charleville musket (left overs from the American Revolutionary War)
- Model 1766 Charleville musket (left overs from the American Revolutionary War)
- Model 1777 Charleville musket (left overs from the American Revolutionary War)
- Brown Bess (captured and left overs from the American Revolutionary War)
- Long rifle
- 1792 contract rifle
- Model 1814 common rifle

==== Pistols ====
- Simeon North Pistol
- Harper's Ferry flintlock pistol

==== Artillery ====
- 6-pounder smoothbore cannon
- Columbiad

== American allied tribes ==
=== Melee weapons ===
- Tomahawk
- Battle axe
- War club
- Spear

=== Small arms ===
==== Muskets and rifles ====
- Springfield Model 1795
