= Model 1814 common rifle =

United States M1814 rifle
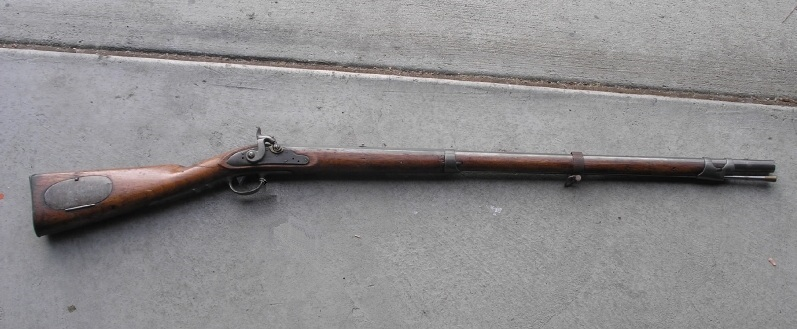
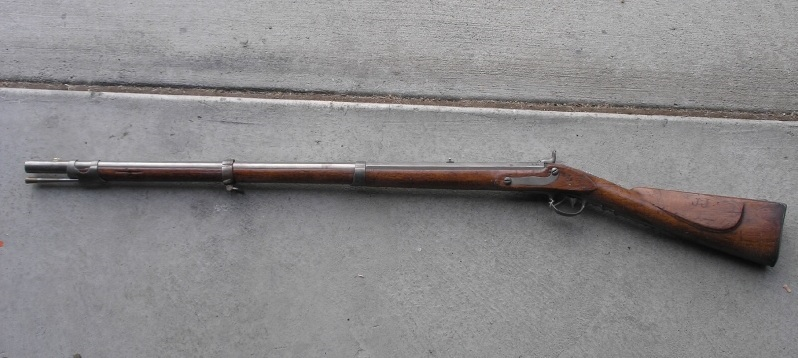
- , A percussion converted R. Johnson made US Model 1814 rifle.
- Type: Muzzle-loading rifle
- Place of origin: United States

Service history
- Used by: United States
- Wars: War of 1812, Seminole Wars, Mexican American War, American Civil War

Production history
- Designer: Marine T. Wickham
- Designed: 1814
- Manufacturer: Gunsmiths Henry Deringer, R. Johnson
- Produced: 1814–?

Specifications
- Length: 49 in (1,200 mm)
- Barrel length: 33 in (840 mm)
- Width: 2.75 in (70 mm)
- Height: 7 in (180 mm)
- Cartridge: .54 ball, black powder, paper
- Caliber: 0.54 in (14 mm)
- Action: Flintlock/percussion lock (conversion)
- Rate of fire: 2–3 per minute
- Feed system: Muzzle-loaded

The U.S. M1814 rifle was designed by Robert T. Wickham. The manufacturing was contracted out to Henry Deringer and R. Johnson to make rifles for use by the military.

== Types ==
Wickham type

This was the U.S. M1814 rifle designed by Robert T. Wickham. Two manufacturers made this type, Henry Deringer of Philadelphia and R. Johnston of Connecticut. Wickham sent the pattern to Deringer with a contract for 1000 rifles. One of Deringer's rifles was then sent to R. Johnson to be duplicated, with a contract for 1000 more. It was mounted with iron and had an oval patch box. It had a 33-inch barrel, octagon near the flintlock, turning to round, and using a .54 caliber bullet.

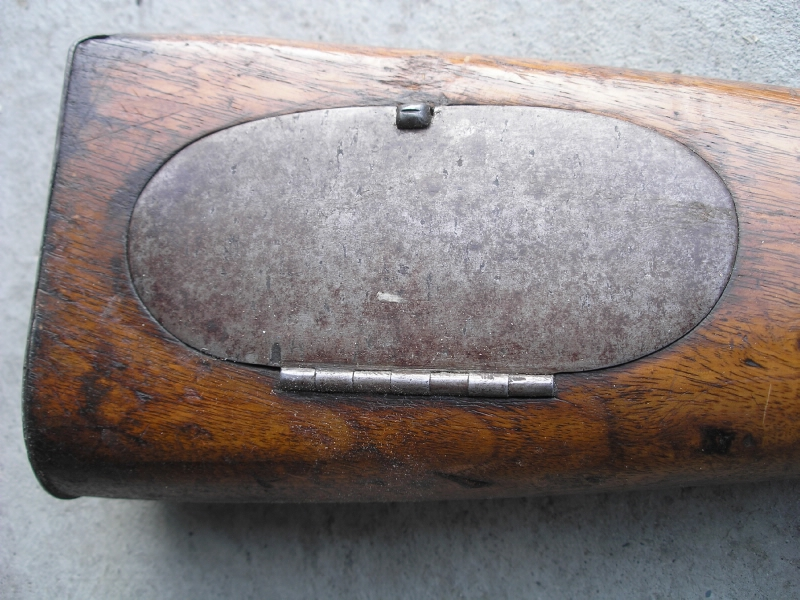

Pre-production rifle

Not the M1814, but a rifle of Deringer's design. It was closer to a Pennsylvania–Kentucky style rifle than a military styled rifle. Deringer began making these rifles for the army before winning the 1814 contract making 51 rifles that were accepted for military service. One example of these rifles survives today. Unlike the Wickam type, the pre-production model was not iron mounted. The rifle is full stocked, with a 38-inch barrel that is octagon near the flintlock and becomes round about a third of the way down the barrel. It had a long-rectangular bronze patch box mounted in the buttstock.

Indian rifle

A smoothbore version was also under contract with the government as a trade rifle, for sales to the Native Americans. The government wanted approximations of long rifles, but did not want them to have rifled weapons.

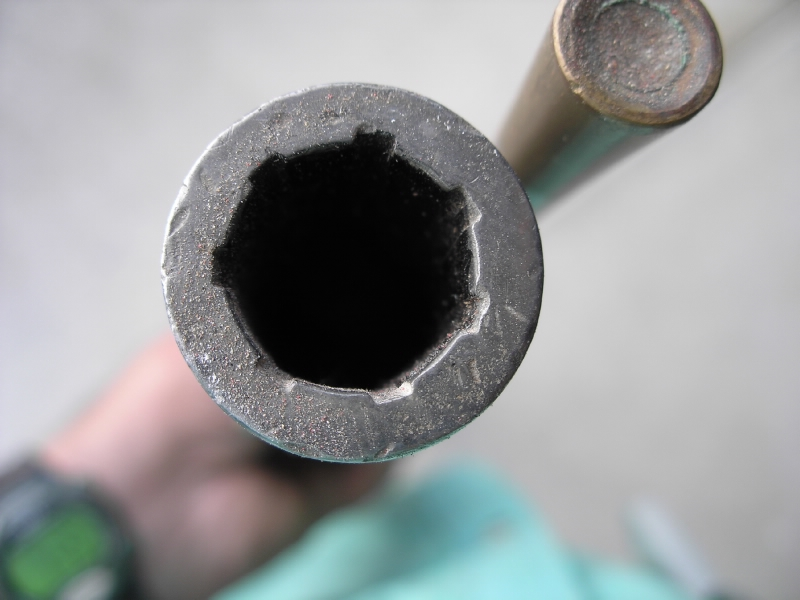

== Use during the American Civil War ==
The rifles saw use during the American Civil War. Company A of the 2nd Mississippi Infantry carried these rifles, converted to percussion cap.

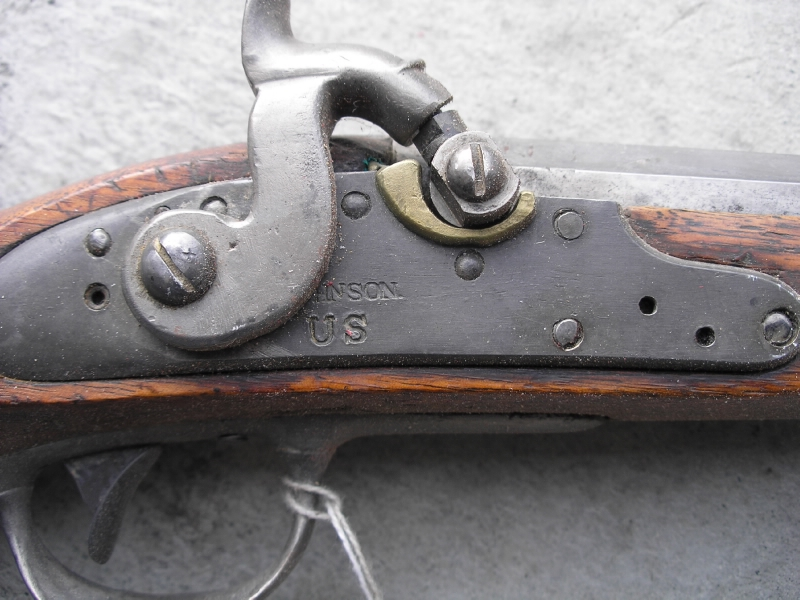
Note the rifle lock; this rifle was converted to percussion cap. The original would have been a flintlock. The percussion-cap lock still has Johnson's name engraved on it.

== See also ==
- Harpers Ferry M1803
- 1792 contract rifle for the earlier process for producing firearms
- M1817 common rifle
- Rifles in the American Civil War
