= Long rifle =

"Pennsylvania/Kentucky" Rifle
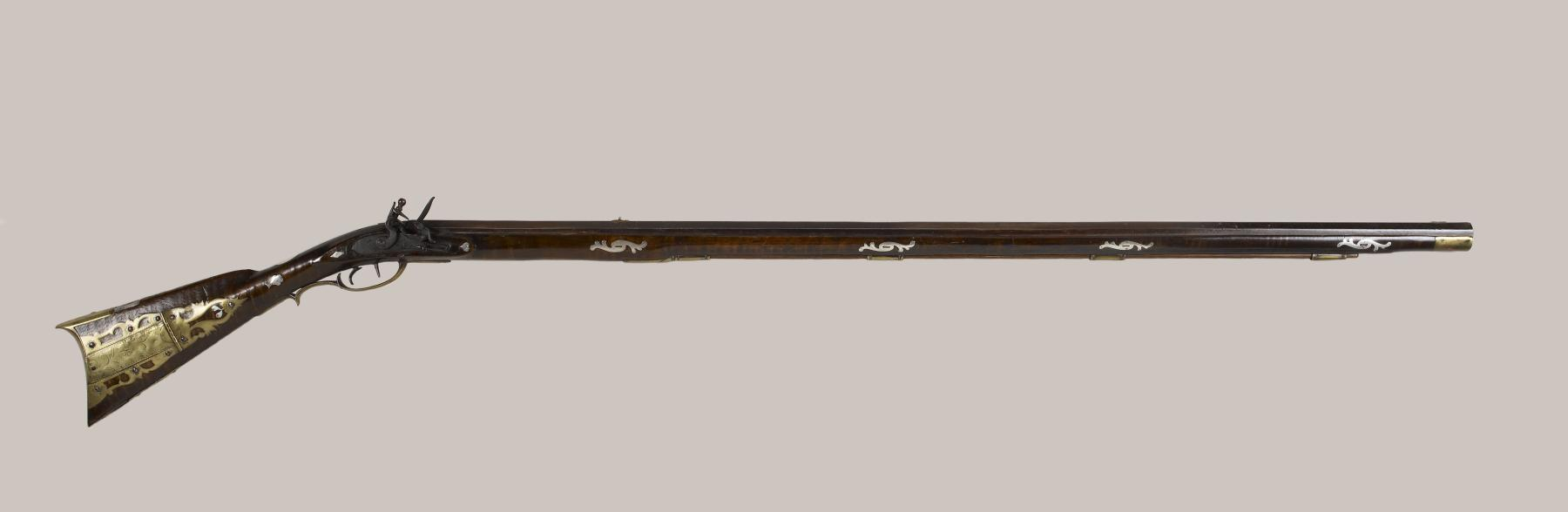
- Type: Muzzle-loaded long gun
- Place of origin: Lancaster, Pennsylvania

Service history
- In service: Circa 1700 – Circa 1900
- Used by: British American colonies (until 1776); United States (1776–20th century); Confederate States (primarily as personal weapons brought from home by soldiers)
- Wars: French and Indian War; American Indian Wars; American Revolutionary War; War of 1812; Texan Revolution; Mexican–American War; Bleeding Kansas; American Civil War

Production history
- Designer: Martin Meylin and/or Robert Baker
- Designed: Circa 1700s
- No. built: Approximately 73,000
- Variants: Hunting variant

Specifications
- Mass: Variable, typically 7 to 10 lb (3.2–4.5 kg)
- Length: 54 to 70 in (1,370–1,780 mm)
- Barrel length: 32 to 48 in (810–1,220 mm)
- Caliber: .25 cal to .62 cal (6.4–15.7 mm) with .40 to .48 cal (10.2–12.2 mm) being most common
- Action: Flintlock/percussion lock (predominant after 1850)
- Rate of fire: User dependent, Usually 2 or more rounds a minute
- Muzzle velocity: 1,200–1,600 ft/s (370–490 m/s)
- Effective firing range: Variable, 100 yards typical, to well over 200 yards by an experienced user
- Feed system: Muzzle-loaded

The long rifle, also known as the Kentucky rifle, Pennsylvania rifle, or American long rifle, is a muzzle-loading firearm used for hunting and warfare. It was one of the first commonly used rifles. The American rifle was characterized by a very long barrel of relatively small caliber, uncommon in European rifles of the period.

The long rifle is an early example of a firearm using rifling (spiral grooves in the bore), which caused the projectile, commonly a round lead ball in the early firearm, to spin around the axis of its motion. This increased the stability of its trajectory and dramatically improved accuracy over contemporary smooth-bore muskets, which were cheaper and more common. Rifled firearms were first used in major combat in the American colonies in the eighteenth century during the French and Indian War, and later the American Revolution, with increasing use in the War of 1812, Texan Revolution, and American Civil War.

The main disadvantages of muzzle-loading rifles compared to muskets were higher cost, a slower reload time due to the use of a tighter-fitting lead ball, and greater susceptibility to fouling of the bore after prolonged use, which would ultimately prevent loading and make the weapon useless until cleaned. The invention of the Minié ball in 1847 resolved the technical disadvantages and allowed the rifle to replace the musket.

The long rifle was made popular by German gunsmiths who immigrated to America, bringing with them the technology of rifling from where it originated. The accuracy achieved by the long rifle made it an ideal tool for hunting wildlife for food.

== Origins ==
From a flat bar of soft iron, hand forged into a gun barrel; laboriously bored and rifled with crude tools; fitted with a stock hewn from a maple tree in the neighboring forest; and supplied with a lock hammered to shape on the anvil; an unknown smith, in a shop long since silent, fashioned a rifle which changed the whole course of world history; made possible the settlement of a continent; and ultimately freed our country of foreign domination.

Light in weight; graceful in line; economical in consumption of powder and lead; fatally precise; distinctly American; it sprang into immediate popularity; and for a hundred years was a model often slightly varied but never radically changed.

— Captain John G. W. Dillin, "Dedication", The Kentucky Rifle

The long rifle was developed on the American frontier in southeastern Pennsylvania, in the early 1700s. It continued to be developed technically and artistically until it passed out of fashion in the 19th century. The long rifle was the product of German gunsmiths who immigrated to new settlements in southeastern Pennsylvania in the early 1700s, and later in Virginia and other territories, reproducing early Jäger rifles (meaning "hunter" and sometimes anglicized Jaeger), which were used for hunting in Germany in the 17th and early 18th century. Tax records from these locales indicate the dates these gunsmiths were in business. Strong pockets of long rifle use and manufacture continued in the Appalachian Mountains of Virginia, Tennessee, Kentucky, Ohio, and North Carolina well into the 20th century as a practical and efficient firearm for those rural segments of the nation. Long rifles could be made entirely by hand and hand-operated tooling, in a frontier setting.

Initially, the long firearm of choice on the frontier was the smoothbore musket, or trade gun, built in factories in England and France and shipped to the colonies for purchase. Gradually, long rifles became more popular due to their longer effective range. While the smooth bore musket had an effective range of less than 100 yards, a rifleman could hit a man-sized target at a range of 200 yards or more. The price for this accuracy was that the long rifle took significantly longer to reload than the approximately 20 seconds of the musket.

In Pennsylvania, the earliest gunsmiths that can be documented are Robert Baker and the Martin Meylins, father and son. Robert Baker formed a partnership with his son Caleb, and on August 15, 1719, erected a gun boring mill on Pequea Creek. In the tax records of Berks County, Pennsylvania, there were several gunsmiths plying their trade along the banks of the Wyomissing Creek.

Martin Meylin's Gunshop was built in 1719, and it is here that the Mennonite gunsmiths of Swiss-German heritage crafted some of the earliest, and possibly the first, Pennsylvania Rifles. No rifle signed by Martin Meylin has been found; although two have been attributed to him, one in the Lancaster Historical Society has been found to be a European musket of a later date, and one with a date of 1705 is a forgery, as the Meylins arrived in America in 1710. The Martin Meylin Gunshop still stands today in Willow Street, Pennsylvania, on Long Rifle Road. An archaeological dig performed in 2005 by Millersville University around the so-called Meylin gunshop found thousands of artifacts, but only for blacksmithing, with no evidence of gun-making. The Lancaster County Historical Society has an original Pennsylvania Long Rifle thought to have been smithed by Meylin that was passed down within the family for seven generations, then donated to the society in the middle of the twentieth century. It was analyzed and the barrel removed during the Lancaster Long Rifle Exhibit at Landis Valley Farm Museum, Lancaster, Pennsylvania in 2005. The barrel was found to be European, and the stock dated from later than 1710-1750. The initials on the barrel, "MM", were found to have been added later than any other part of the gun, so it could not have been made by either Martin Meylin.

Some historians have written that the role of Martin Meylin as one of the earliest gunsmiths in Lancaster is not clear. The argument is that the will of Martin Meylin Sr. makes no mention of gunsmith items, while the will of Martin Meylin Jr. is replete with them, so that the reference to Meylin as a gunsmith is more properly placed on the son. In any case, no rifle has been found to be positively attributed to any Meylin.

There is documentation stating that the first high-quality long rifles were from a gunsmith named Jacob Dickert, who moved with his family from Germany to Berks County, Pennsylvania in 1740. The name 'Dickert Rifle' was considered a 'brand name' and the name 'Kentucky rifle' was not coined until much later in history (circa 1820s) and became the "nickname" of this rifle. This is primarily because Dickert made rifles for the Continental Army, and later had a contract dated 1792 to furnish rifles to the United States Army. The rifle is sometimes referred to as the "Deckard / Deckhard" rifle, as descendants of Jacob Dickert used these variations, as shown by census documents, marriage, and death certificates. Nearly all descendants of Jacob Dickert go by the surname "Deckard", and mostly live in Indiana and Missouri.

Among documented working rifle makers are Adam Haymaker, who had a thriving trade in the northern Shenandoah Valley of Virginia, the Moravian gunshops at Christian's Spring in Pennsylvania, John Frederick Klette of Stevensburg, Virginia, and in the Salem area of North Carolina. All three areas were busy and productive centers of rifle making by the 1750s. Another prominent rifle maker was Isaac Haines of the Lancaster school, known for the elaborate Rococo woodcarving decorations on his rifles, who was taxed as a gunsmith in Lampeter Twp., Lancaster Co., from 1772 to 1792. The Great Wagon Road was a bustling frontier thoroughfare, and rifle shops traced this same route, from eastern Pennsylvania, down the Shenandoah Valley, and spilling into both the Cumberland Gap into Kentucky and the Yadkin River (Salem) area of North Carolina.

The settlers of western Virginia (Kentucky), Tennessee, and North Carolina soon gained a reputation for hardy independence and rifle marksmanship as a way of life, further reinforced by the performance of riflemen in the American Revolution, especially Morgan's Riflemen, who were pivotal in the Battles of Saratoga and Cowpens, as well as the War of 1812. In that war, the long rifle gained its nickname "Kentucky Rifle", after a popular song "The Hunters of Kentucky", about Andrew Jackson and his victory at the Battle of New Orleans.

Frontiersman Daniel Boone is said to have used the long rifle. It also was used by the Texans in the Texas Revolution.

The reason for the long rifle's characteristic long barrel is a matter of adaptation to the new world by the German immigrant gunsmiths. The German gunsmiths working in America were very familiar with German rifles, which seldom had barrels longer than 30 in (76 cm), and were large-caliber rifles using large amounts of lead. Hunters in the vast and sparsely populated new world forests had to carry more of their supplies with them. The smaller caliber required less heavy lead per shot, reducing the weight they had to carry; the longer barrel gave the black powder more time to burn, increasing the muzzle velocity and accuracy. A rule of thumb used by some gunsmiths was to make the rifle no longer than the height of a customer's chin because of the necessity of seeing the muzzle while loading. The longer barrel also allowed finer sighting. By the 1750s it was common to see frontiersmen carrying the new and distinctive style of rifle.

=== Evolution ===
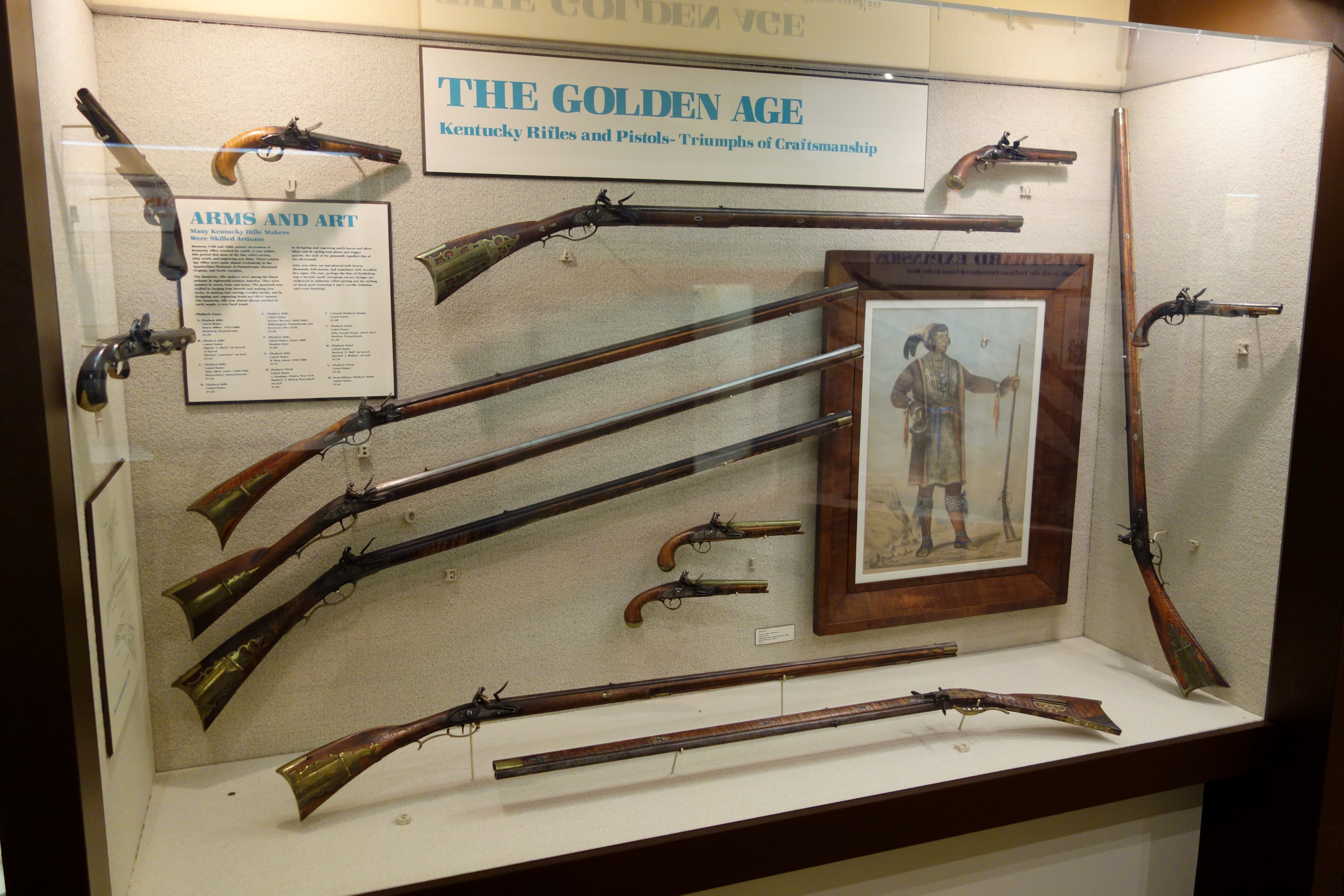
Long rifles of various Pennsylvania and Massachusetts manufacturers displayed at the Huntington Museum of Art

In 1792 the US Army began to modify the long rifle, shortening the barrel length to 42 inches (1,070 mm) in their 1792 contract rifle. The Lewis and Clark Expedition carried an even shorter 33–36-inch-barrelled (840–910 mm) rifle, similar to the Harpers Ferry Model 1803 which began production six months after Lewis visited the arsenal. The Model 1803 resembles what became the 'plains rifle'.

The "plains rifle" or "Hawken rifle" was a shorter rifle more suitable for carrying on horseback. It was popular among mountain men and North American fur trappers in the 19th century. The Hawken brothers (Samuel and Jacob) were two of a number of famous gunsmiths active in St. Louis in the 1830s–1860s. Many renowned gunsmiths such as Horace (H. E.) Dimick and J. P. Gemmer produced powerful and portable "short" rifles for the Rocky Mountain fur trade, overland exploration, and the transcontinental immigrant trains. The plains rifle combined accuracy with portability in a more compact package than the extreme long guns from which it had evolved. The Hawken rifle evolved from the long rifle for use against larger, more dangerous game encountered in the American West. For firing heavier and larger diameter bullets with heavier powder loads, the barrel wall thickness was necessarily increased for strength, and the barrel of the Hawken was shortened to keep the weight manageable, making the rifle heavier and less slim than the long rifle. However, many plains rifles were bored around the smaller .40 calibre range for medium-game hunting.

== Characteristics ==
Artistically, the long rifle is known for its graceful stock, often made of curly maple, and its ornate decoration, decorative inlays, and an integral, well-made patch box that was built into the stock. The decorative arts of furniture making, painting, silver smithing, gunsmithing, etc. all took their style cues from the prevailing trends of the day, and as in most things the fashion was set in Paris. Baroque and later rococo motifs found their way into all the decorative arts, and can be seen in the acanthus leaf scroll work so common on 18th century furniture and silver.

Originally rather plain, by the 1770s every surface of the rifle could have applied artwork. An accomplished gunsmith had to be a skilled blacksmith, whitesmith, wood carver, brass and silver founder, engraver, and wood finisher. European shops at the time had significant specialization of the trades, leading to separate tradesmen building different parts of each rifle. The American frontier had no such luxury, and quite often a single gunmaker would make the entire rifle, a process almost unheard of in 18th-century trade practice. The flintlock action, with its spring mechanism, and single-action trigger, though, was often purchased in bulk from England by gunsmiths, and then fabricated with skill into an elaborate rifle. Early locks were imported, but domestic manufacturing of locks increased in America among the more skilled gunsmiths in later years.

To conserve lead on the frontier, smaller calibers were often preferred, ranging often from about .32 to .45 cal. As a rifle's bore increased with use due to wear and corrosion from firing black powder, it was not uncommon to see rifles re-bored and re-rifled to larger calibers to maintain accuracy. Many copies of historical long rifles are seen with a bore of around .50 caliber.

The long rifle is said by modern experts to have a range of 80 to 100 yards for the average user. An expert shooter can extend the median range of the long rifle to 200-300 yards.

Although less commonly owned or seen on the frontier, the long rifle style was also used on flintlock pistols during the same era. These pistols were often matched in caliber to a long rifle owned by the same user, to enable firing a common-sized and common-patched round lead ball. With the same graceful stock lines and barrel style, and craftsmanship, they were noticeably slimmer and had a longer rifled barrel with better sights than had been seen on the earlier Colonial style flintlock pistols. Dueling pistol sets in the long rifle style were also made, sometimes in a cased set, for wealthy gentlemen.

== Decline and rebirth ==
By the 20th century, there was little traditional long rifle making left except in isolated pockets in the Appalachian mountains. Popular interest in shooting as a sport as well as the sesquicentennial of the United States' independence from Britain in 1925-33 spurred interest in the origins of the long rifle. This renewed interest was described in the 1924 book by Capt. John G.W. Dillin The Kentucky Rifle. Early 20th century pioneers of long rifle culture were Walter Cline, Horace Kephart, Ned Roberts, Red Farris, Hacker Martin, Bill Large, Jack Weichold, Ben Hawkins, D.C. Addicks, L.M. Wolf, Dave Taylor, Win Woods, and Alvin Wagner.

Many men throughout the remainder of the 20th century worked to expand the knowledge of the long rifle and how to recreate it in the 18th and 19th century manner. In 1965, Wallace Gusler, as the first master of the Gunsmith shop in Colonial Williamsburg, was the first to recreate a long rifle in modern times using 18th-century tools and techniques. The 1968 film "Gunsmith of Williamsburg" documented the production of his second, all handmade, long rifle. By 2003, makers trained at the Gunsmith Shop in Colonial Williamsburg and others produced an all-handmade rifles. In addition to his influence in his popular series of articles for Rifle Magazine and his involvement with the Museum of Early Southern Decorative Arts (MESDA), John Bivins trained the recognized gunmakers Jim Chambers and Mark Silver.

In 1996, the Contemporary Longrifle Association (CLA) was founded for people hand-making recreations of long rifles and associated arms and crafts of pre-1840 America. Later, internet forums about building traditional muzzleloading arms grew to over 3,000 members by 2010.

== In popular culture ==
- Davy Crockett is portrayed carrying the rifle in literature and film.
- The 1826 novel by James Fenimore Cooper The Last of the Mohicans (and the films based on it) features a long rifle-wielding character, Nathan Hawkeye (played in the 1992 film by Daniel Day-Lewis), who is nicknamed by the allies of the French army as La Longue Carabine ("Long rifle").
- The 1930 novel The Long Rifle by Steward Edward White tells the story of a farm boy who inherits Daniel Boone's Kentucky rifle.
- The 1955 western Kentucky Rifle gravitates around a trail wagon containing one hundred long rifles. The gun, which is actually the main star of that movie, is displayed under every angle and is even the object of lyric descriptive monologues by veteran actor Chill Wills.
- On the show Antiques Roadshow an 1810 Kentucky rifle was appraised at $20,000.
- The Kentucky long rifle was featured in the fifth episode of History Channel's reality television show Top Shot.
- The rifle was used by George Washington's forces in the first episode of the third season Deadliest Warrior.
- Leonardo DiCaprio portrays Hugh Glass in the film The Revenant and uses a Bucks County long rifle built by modern American gunmaker Ron Luckenbill until it is stolen by Hugh's nemesis Fitzgerald.
- The rifle makes an appearance in Age of Empires III: Definitive Edition as a technology unique to the United States' selection of Shipment Cards. Sending Long Rifles in the Commerce Age enhances the ranges at which Marines, State Militia, the game's representation of the United States Volunteers, and Minutemen both detect and attack enemy soldiers.

== See also ==
- Fusil de chasse
- Sharps rifle
- Buffalo rifle
- Hawken rifle
- Jezail
