= Model 1817 common rifle =

Deringer M1817 rifle
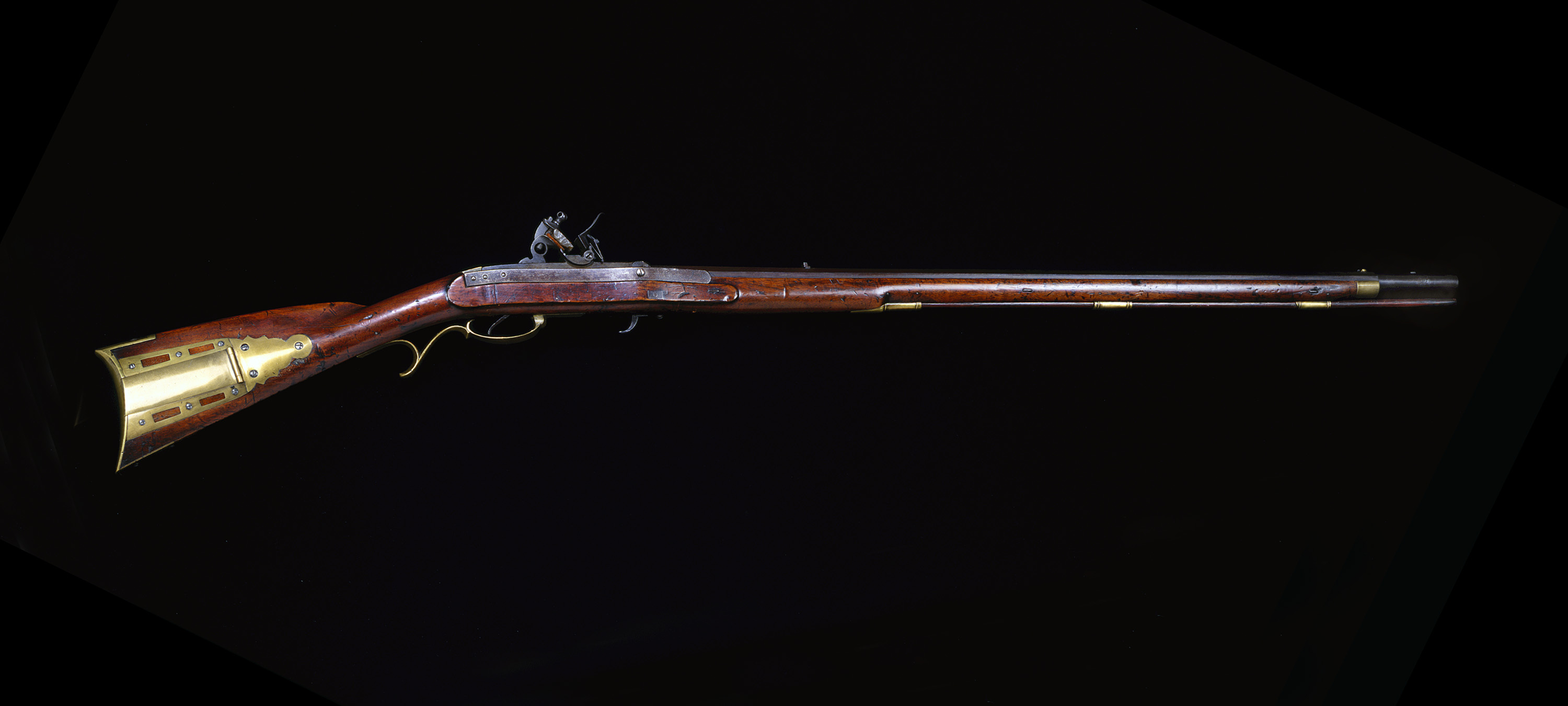
- A Model 1817 rifle produced by John H. Hall for the US government
- Type: Muzzle-loading rifle
- Place of origin: United States

Service history
- Used by: United States; Confederate States
- Wars: Seminole Wars, Texas Revolution, American Civil War

Production history
- Designer: M.T. Wickham and Harpers Ferry Armory
- Designed: 1817
- Produced: 1817–1842
- No. built: 38,200

Specifications
- Mass: 9.3 lb (4.2 kg)
- Barrel length: 36 in (910 mm)
- Cartridge: .54 ball, black powder, paper
- Caliber: 0.54 in (14 mm)
- Action: Flintlock/percussion lock (conversion)
- Rate of fire: 2–3 per minute
- Feed system: Muzzle-loaded

The M1817 common rifle (also known as Deringer M1817 rifle) was a flintlock muzzle-loaded weapon issued due to the Department of Ordnance's order of 1814, produced by Henry Deringer and used from the 1820s to 1840s at the American frontier. Unlike the half octagon barreled M1814 common rifle that preceded it, it had a barrel that was round for most of its length. The 36-inch barrel was rifled for .54 caliber bullets. For rifling it had seven grooves. Like the M1814 common rifle, it had a large oval patch box in the stock, however the stock dropped steeper than on the M1814 common rifle.

After producing the M1814 common rifle through contractors, the military decided to do the same with the M1817 rifle. The Harpers Ferry Arsenal produced a pattern weapon, which was then taken to gunsmiths to be copied. The rifle was built by Henry Deringer of Philadelphia (13,000 made), Nathan Starr & Co. of Middleton, Connecticut (10,200 made), Simeon North of Middleton, Connecticut (7,200 made), R. Johnson of Middleton, Connecticut (5,000 made), R. & J. D. Johnson of Middleton, Connecticut (3,000 made).

The rifling gun saw notable use during the Texas Federalist War against the Mexican centralist government., particularly among the New Orleans Greys and Texian Militia at the Alamo.

Over time the rifles became obsolete, but they still saw service during the American Civil War; originally flintlocks, most were converted to percussion cap for their firing mechanism. They saw service in the west, as far as California, where there were still M1817 rifles in the Bencia, California, arsenal in the 1860s. Deringer Model 1817 issued among Pennsylvania regiment. The rifle was held by Confederate forces, specifically featuring a conversion performed by a Virginian and utilizing percussion cap supplies sourced from Britain.

== See also ==
- Harpers Ferry M1803
- Rifles in the American Civil War

== Bibliography ==
- Russel, Carl P., Guns on the early frontiers: A history of firearms from colonial times, University of Nebraska Press, 1980, 395 p., ISBN 0-8032-3857-6
