= Combat Infantryman Badge =

United States Army decoration

- Type: Special Skill Group 1 Badge
- Awarded for: Performing duties while personally present and under fire while serving in an assigned infantry or Special Forces capacity, in a unit of brigade, regimental, or smaller size, engaged in active ground combat
- Presented by: United States Army
- Eligibility: U.S. Army infantry or special forces officers (SSI 11 or 18) in the grade of colonel or below, Army enlisted soldiers and warrant officers with an infantry or Special Forces military occupational specialty
- Status: Currently awarded
- Established: 15 November 1943

Precedence
- Next (higher): None
- Next (lower): Combat Medical Badge
- Related: Expert Infantryman Badge

The Combat Infantryman Badge (CIB) is a United States Army decoration awarded to soldiers who fought in active ground combat as members of either an infantry or Special Forces unit, of brigade size or smaller, any time after 6 December 1941. The award is given only to soldiers at the rank of colonel and below.

The CIB and its non-combat contemporary, the Expert Infantryman Badge (EIB), were created in November 1943 during World War II to boost morale and increase the prestige of infantry service. It recognizes the inherent danger and sacrifice of infantrymen, who face greater risk of becoming a casualty than any other military occupational specialty.

== Creation ==
After the United States entry into World War II, the War Department had difficulty recruiting into the Army Infantry Branch when men were given the opportunity to choose their branch assignment. Infantry morale remained low, as "infantryman continuously operated under the worst conditions" and "suffer[ed] the most casualties while receiving the least public recognition." As a result, Lieutenant General Lesley J. McNair, commanding officer of the U.S. Army Ground Forces, championed the idea of creating an award recognizing the unique dangers faced by infantrymen.

On 27 October 1943, the War Department formally established the Combat Infantryman Badge (CIB) and the Expert Infantryman Badge (EIB):

The present war has demonstrated the importance of highly-proficient, tough, hard, and aggressive infantry, which can be obtained only by developing a high degree of individual all-around proficiency on the part of every infantryman. As a means of attaining the high standards desired and to foster esprit de corps in infantry units, the Expert Infantryman and the Combat Infantryman badges are established for infantry personnel.

The CIB was officially authorized by executive order on 15 November 1943. Since its creation, Army leaders have prevented the adoption of any other awards that would lower its prestige. At the close of World War II, the largest war in which armor and artillery played key roles in the ground campaigns, a review was conducted of the CIB criteria with consideration being given to creating either additional badges or authorizing the badge to cavalry and armor units. The review noted that any change in policy would detract from the prestige of the badge.

== Eligibility requirements ==
A soldier must meet the following requirements to be awarded the Combat Infantryman Badge subsequent to 6 December 1941:

1. Rank and role: Be an infantryman or Special Forces soldier (Specialty Skill Indentifier 11 or 18) at the rank of colonel or below satisfactorily performing those duties. General officers are ineligible. (Note: The original CIB regulations, published 27 October 1943, did not prohibit generals from receiving the award, and General Omar Bradley received the CIB on 29 April 1944. The stipulation excluding generals was added on 17 October 1944; nevertheless, between 1946 and 1961, CIBs were awarded on an exceptional basis to Generals Joseph Stilwell, Jonathan M. Wainwright, and Douglas MacArthur.)
1. Unit assignment: Assigned or attached to an infantry, ranger, or Special Forces unit of brigade, regimental, or smaller size. Members of headquarters companies for units larger than a brigade are ineligible.
2. Combat action: Personally present, under hostile fire, and actively participating in ground combat while the unit is engaged (campaign or battle credit alone is insufficient).
- MOS and specialty rules: Personnel without an infantry or Special Forces MOS/SSI are not eligible under any circumstances. The specialty does not have to be the soldier's primary duty, provided they are properly trained, hold the appropriate skill code, and are actively serving in that specialty during the combat. Non-medical Special Forces eligibility (MOS 18B, 18C, 18E, 18F, 18Z) began on 20 December 1989, with no prior retroactive awards allowed.
- On or after 18 September 2001:
  - Direct fire rule: All eligible soldiers must be personally present and under fire to close with and destroy the enemy with direct fires.
  - Special Forces medics: Soldiers with MOS 18D (Special Forces Medical Sergeant) became eligible for the CIB under these same direct-fire combat rules. Retroactive CIB awards for 18D are not authorized prior to this date. 18D soldiers who qualified for the Combat Medical Badge between 18 September 2001 and 3 June 2005 remain qualified for the CMB.

== Qualifying periods and conflicts ==
A soldier may earn the CIB for participation in active ground combat in the following qualifying wars, conflicts, and operations. Only one CIB be may be awarded for service in each qualifying period, even if participating in multiple conflicts or operations within that period.

Qualifying period	Conflict or operation	Start date	End date	Ref.
World War II	World War II	7 December 1941	3 September 1945	
Korean War	Korean War	27 June 1950	27 July 1953	
Vietnam War and other operations (2 March 1961–10 March 1995)	Republic of Vietnam Conflict	2 March 1961	28 March 1973	
Vietnam War and other operations (2 March 1961–10 March 1995)	Laos	19 April 1961	6 October 1962	
Vietnam War and other operations (2 March 1961–10 March 1995)	Dominican Republic	28 April 1965	1 September 1966	
Vietnam War and other operations (2 March 1961–10 March 1995)	Korea on the demilitarized zone (DMZ)	4 January 1969	31 March 1994	
Vietnam War and other operations (2 March 1961–10 March 1995)	El Salvador	1 January 1981	1 February 1992	
Vietnam War and other operations (2 March 1961–10 March 1995)	Grenada	23 October 1983	21 November 1983	
Vietnam War and other operations (2 March 1961–10 March 1995)	Joint Security Area, Panmunjom, Korea	23 November 1984	23 November 1984	
Vietnam War and other operations (2 March 1961–10 March 1995)	Panama	20 December 1989	31 January 1990	
Vietnam War and other operations (2 March 1961–10 March 1995)	Southwest Asia Conflict	17 January 1991	11 April 1991	
Vietnam War and other operations (2 March 1961–10 March 1995)	Somalia	5 June 1993	31 March 1994	
Global War on Terrorism (18 September 2001–16 April 2026)	Afghanistan	18 September 2001	30 August 2021	
Global War on Terrorism (18 September 2001–16 April 2026)	Iraq	19 March 2003	31 December 2011	
Global War on Terrorism (18 September 2001–16 April 2026)	Operation Inherent Resolve	15 June 2014	16 April 2026	

== Badge design ==
The CIB as a second award

The badge is 3 inches (76 mm) wide and 1 inch (25 mm) high, consisting of a silver-bordered rectangle with a blue field depicting a Springfield Model 1795 Musket, all overlaid on an elliptical silver oak wreath. Subsequent awards are indicated with five-pointed stars in the upper wreath.

The CIB is worn 1/4 inch (6.4 mm) above the service ribbons above the left-breast pocket of the Class-A uniform and other uniforms with which the CIB is authorized. As of June 2011, the badge and its sew-on equivalent may be worn on the Army Combat Uniform (ACU).

== Three-time recipients ==
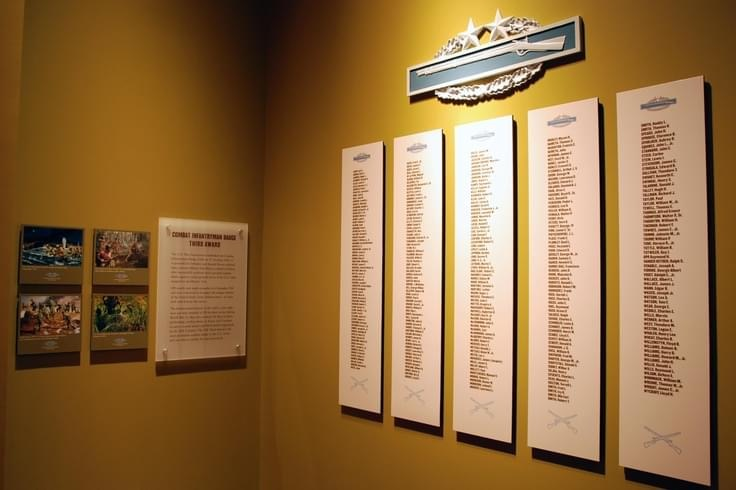
Three-time CIB awardees exhibit, National Infantry Museum

In 1984, the National Infantry Museum at Fort Benning, Georgia, unveiled two plaques listing over 200 soldiers who had received the Combat Infantryman Badge three times. The ceremony was presided over by Lieutenant General David E. Grange Jr., Fort Benning's commander from 1979 to 1981 and a three-time CIB recipient himself, as well as the fort's then-commander, Major General John W. Foss. A new exhibit featuring 325 names was unveiled in 2012.

Because the gap between the second (Korean War) and fourth (Global War on Terrorism) periods of eligibility is nearly 50 years, longer than any likely infantry or Special Forces career, all three-time CIB recipients served in the World War II, the Korean War, and Vietnam qualifying periods.

== Master Combat Infantryman Badge ==
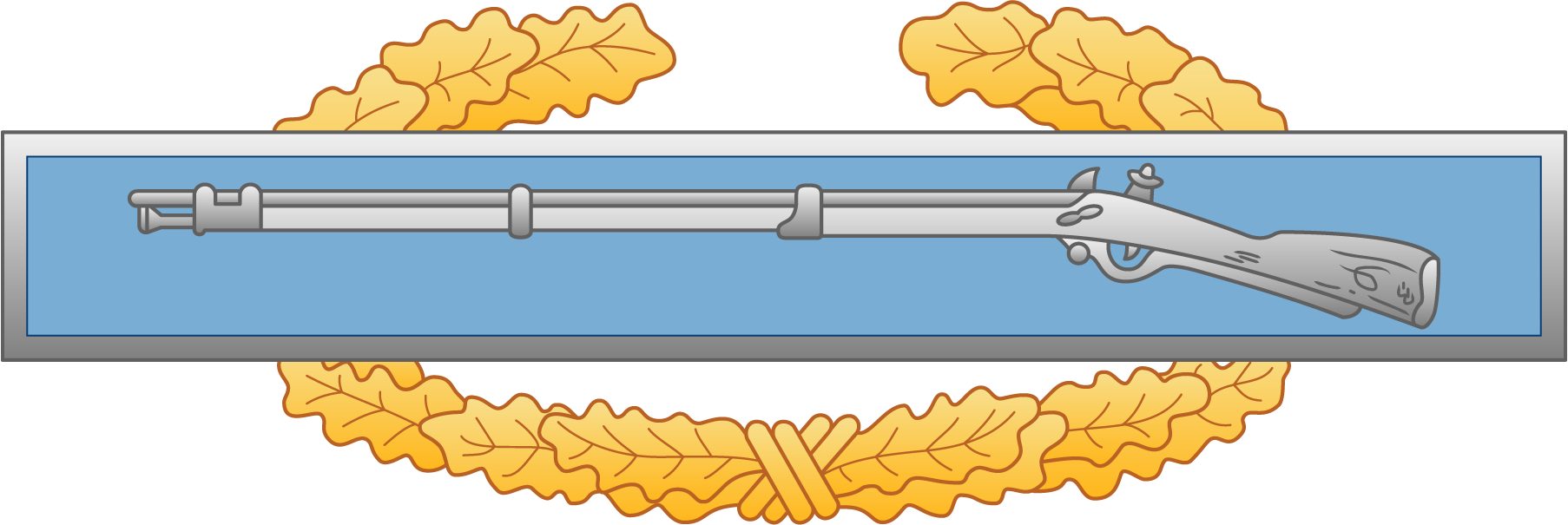
The MCIB as a first award

In 2025, the Master Combat Infantryman Badge (MCIB) was introduced to recognize soldiers who have earned both the Combat Infantryman Badge and the Expert Infantryman Badge, the latter earned by demonstrating mastery of critical soldiering tasks through a grueling multi-day testing process. The MCIB is identical to the CIB in appearance except the silver wreath is replaced by a gold one; subdued pin-on badges and sew-on badges would see their black wreaths also replaced with gold.

== See also ==
- Badges of the United States Army
- Combat Action Badge
- Combat Action Medal
- Combat Action Ribbon
- Combat Medical Badge
