= Martin Meylin =

Inventor of the Kentucky Long Rifle

Martin Meylin (1665, Rhineland-Palatinate (then Prussia) – 1749 (aged 83–84), West Lampeter Township, Lancaster County, Pennsylvania) was a German-born American blacksmith and gunsmith, best known for inventing Daniel Boone's Gun, the "Kentucky Long Rifle".

== Personal life ==
In 1710, Martin Meylin left Zurich for Pequea in what is now Lancaster County, Pennsylvania together with a group of other Mennonites. He received 265 acres of land from the 10,000-acre plot granted by William Penn to settlers from the Palatinate.

Local histories state that Martin Meylin was either a gunsmith or blacksmith, and that Meylin's son, Martin Meylin II, also practiced these professions. As a result, the historical record is hard to parse, as it is not always clear which Meylin is being referred to in any given document.

== The American rifle ==
Martin Meylin of Lancaster County is credited with the invention of the long rifle which later on became known as the "Pennsylvania Rifle" and also the "Kentucky Rifle" of pioneer fame. The "long rifle" is considered to be an important development by gun collectors, as it combined features of British rifling, Germanic style mechanisms, and included a particularly long barrel for great accuracy. The result was an effective, "distinctly American" weapon.
