= Military Police Regimental Association =

The Military Police Regimental Association or MPRA, is a professional organization for Military Police. Founded in 1990, it is purposely aligned to the United States Army Military Police Corps. Membership is open to anyone who has ever served in the United States Army Military Police Corps, as well as anyone who has served as an MP or a civilian police officer, and MPRA claims to have a more than 6,800 current members. The MPRA maintains a Military Police museum at Fort Leonard Wood, Missouri, where the schools are located to train United States Army and United States Marine Corps Military Police. A nearby memorial is also maintained by the MPRA.

The MPRA publishes a quarterly magazine, "The Dragoon," featuring history and news from Military Police Soldiers and units. The Dragoon has also featured news from Marine Corps MP units.

MPRA maintains a scholarship program and a benevolent fund to provide financial assistance to Military Police, or those who support Military Police.

In 2000, the MPRA established the "Order of the Marechaussee" award. It is awarded to exceptional Military Police members to recognize their contribution to the Military Police Corps, and is considered the highest award an MP can receive.
