= Military Police Corps (United States) =

U.S. Army's branch for military police

United States Army Military Police Corps
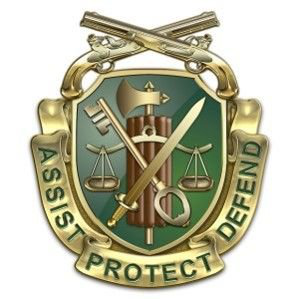
- Regimental insignia
- Active: 26 September 1941 – present
- Country: United States
- Branch: United States Army
- Part of: U.S. Department of the Army
- Motto: "Assist. Protect. Defend."
- Colors: Green, piped with yellow. (Note: Green: 65007 cloth; 67129 yarn; PMS 357. Yellow: 65002 cloth; 67108 yarn; PMS 1230.)
- Engagements: World War II; Korean War; Vietnam War; Gulf War; Kosovo War; War in Afghanistan; Iraq War

Commanders
- Provost Marshal General of the Army: Brigadier General Sarah K. Albrycht
- Commandant: COL Charles A. Green
- Regimental Chief Warrant Officer: CW4 Angela J. Rulewich
- Regimental Command Sergeant Major: CSM James W. Rutherford

Insignia
- Branch insignia

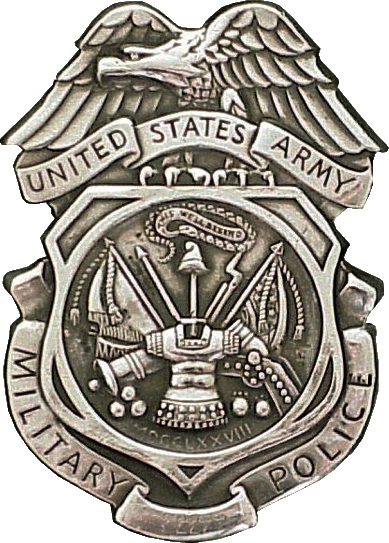
- Shield

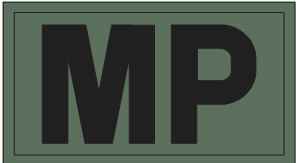
- Brassard

The United States Army Military Police Corps (USAMPC) is the uniformed law enforcement branch of the United States Army. Investigations are conducted by Military Police investigators under the Provost Marshal General's Office or special agents of the United States Army Criminal Investigation Division.

United States Army Military Police units have combat zone responsibilities in addition to their law enforcement duties. These responsibilities include mounted and dismounted patrols, response force operations, area damage control, route reconnaissance, cordon and search operations, critical site security, and convoy and personnel escorts. Operationally, these duties fall under the "security and mobility support" discipline of the Military Police Corps.

== Mission ==
The United States Army's Military Police provide an important function in the full spectrum of Army operations as a member of the Maneuver, Fires, and Effects division. The Military Police Corps provides expertise in policing, detainment, and stability operations in order to enhance security and enable mobility. Military Police are actively utilized in direct combat and during peacetime.

Disciplines

The Military Police tasks can be separated into three disciplines and one integrated function:

1. Security and mobility support operations
2. Police operations
3. Detention operations
4. Police intelligence operations (integrated function across all disciplines)

Career

The Military Police Corps has six career paths within the Army, one for commissioned officers, one for warrant officers, and four for enlisted soldiers:

Currently 31 series, formerly the 95 series, and before that, 1677.

- 31A - Military Police Officer
- 311A - Criminal Investigations Warrant Officer;
- 31B (formerly coded as 95B) - Military Police
- 31D (formerly coded as 95D) - Criminal Investigations Special Agent
- 31E (formerly coded as 95C) - Internment/Resettlement Specialist
- 31K - Military Police Working Dog Handler

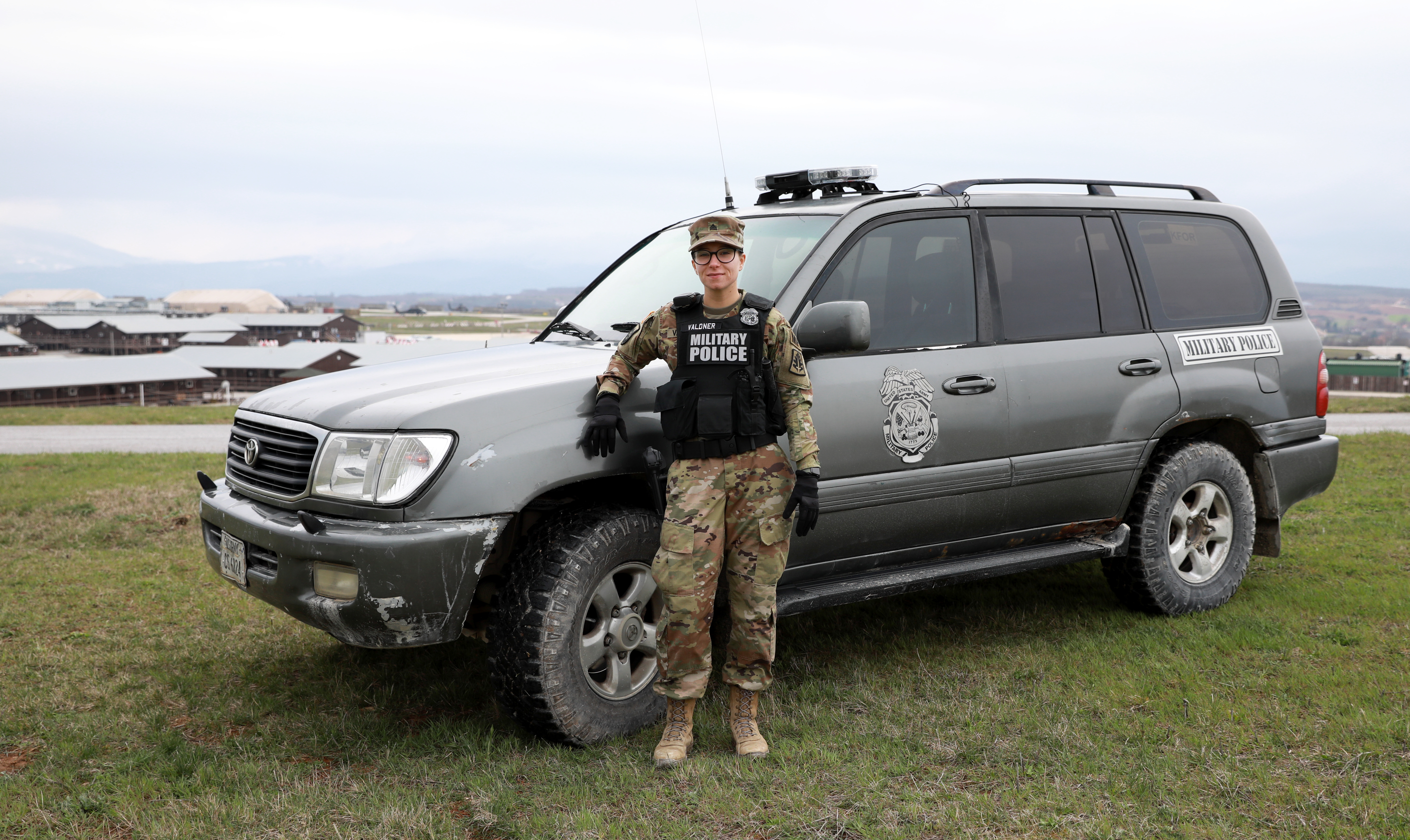
Army Reserve Sgt. Toni Ann Valdner with military police patrol car

A Criminal Investigations Warrant Officer investigates felony crimes and can be tasked to DoD operations in areas like counter-narcotics and HUMINT. An Internment/Resettlement Specialist works in the confinement and correctional facilities of the United States Military. Work includes maintaining physical security and supervision of facilities, but specialists are also responsible for offering counseling services to those within the facility.

== History ==
The Military Police Corps is one of the youngest branches of the United States Army. It was officially established on 26 September 1941, although it has an irregular history dating back to 1776.

=== Military Police in the Revolutionary War ===
The Military Police Corps traces its lineage and history back to the American Revolution. General George Washington requested that the staff position of Provost Marshal be created to deal with disciplinary issues. In January 1776, William Maroney was appointed as the first Provost Marshal of the Continental Army. The Provost Marshals relied on soldiers temporarily drawn from other units, and had difficulty enforcing discipline. On 20 May 1778, Congress established the Provost Corps, which General Washington referred to as the "Marechaussee." This name was from the French: "maréchaussée," from the Old French "mareschaucie," meaning "the marshalcy." Captain Bartholomew von Heer, a German-speaking officer from Pennsylvania, was appointed as the first commander of the Marechaussee on 1 June 1778. Under the new organization, the Provost Marshal was responsible for soldiers under custody and for punishments, while the Marechaussee was tasked with the enforcement of order within the Continental Army. The Marechaussee Corps would be formed exclusively as a police organization, and was organized and equipped as light dragoons, utilizing their speed to aid in troop movements and moving prisoners from the battlefield. The Marechaussee protected the Army's rear and flanks during troop movements, searched for stragglers, guarded river crossings, and engaged in combat when needed, as in the Battle of Springfield. The Provost Corps was disbanded in November 1783.

=== Civil War ===
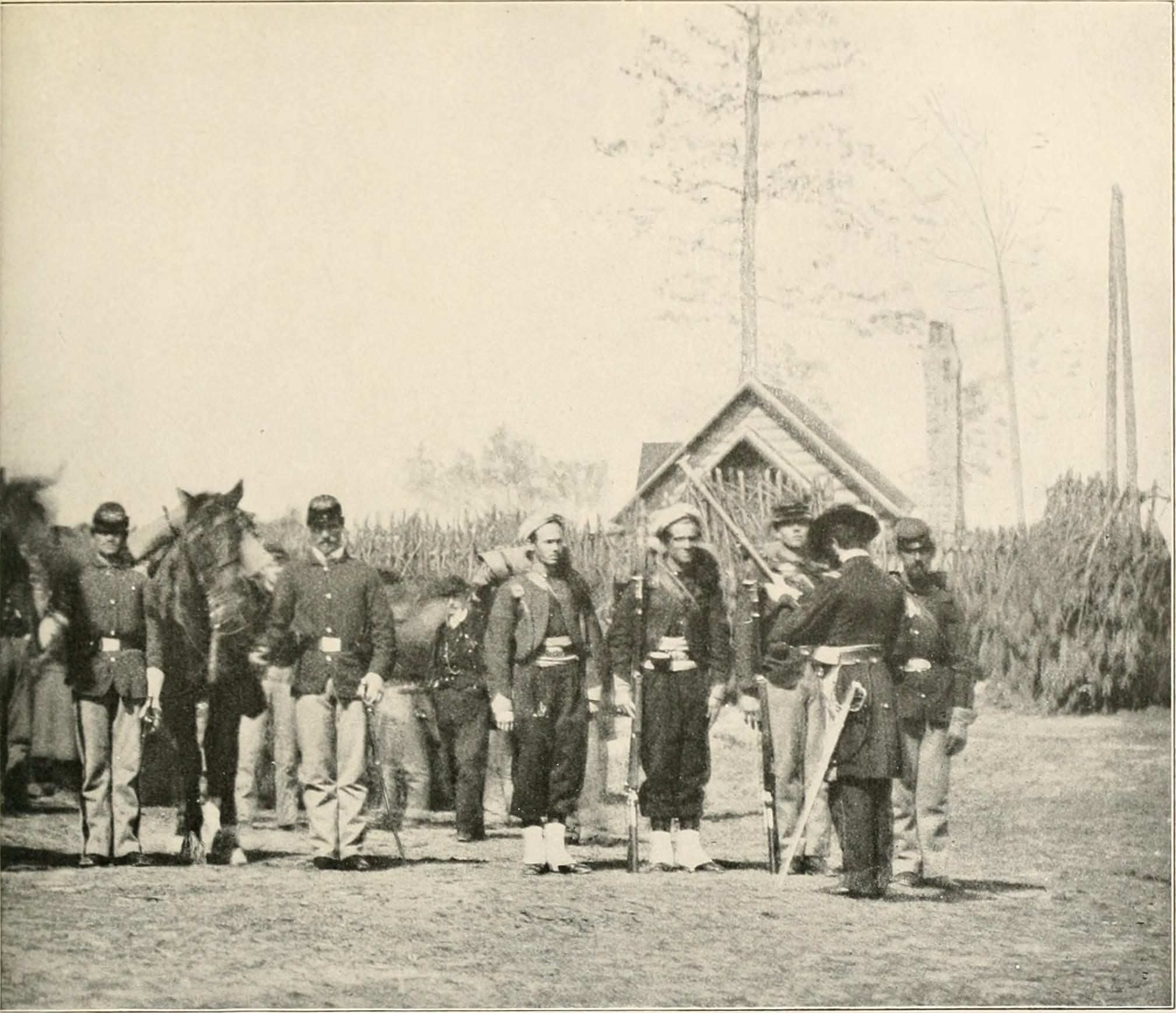
The officer in charge is inspecting the arms of the Zouaves, who are about to dispatch on a provost-guard duty.

In 1863, the Office of the Provost Marshal General was established and oversaw the Veteran Reserve Corps (VRC). In the US Civil War, the VRC maintained law and order at garrison areas, while other provost guard units served on the front lines. After the war, the Office of the Provost Marshal General was discontinued as the Union Army disbanded.

=== Spanish–American War ===
During the Moro Rebellion following the Spanish–American War, the United States founded the Philippine Constabulary. Training began in 1902, and Brigadier General Harry Hill Bandholtz was appointed as chief of the Constabulary in 1907.

=== World War I ===
The complexity of warfare during World War I required a corps of specially-trained soldiers to handle massive numbers of prisoners of war and control the movement of troops and supplies in the zones of operation. The Military Police Training Department was established 9 September 1918 at Caserne Changarnier in Autun, France. Following the war, Brigadier General Harry Hill Bandholtz, who had served as Provost Marshal of the American Expeditionary Forces, proposed the establishment of a permanent Military Police Corps. Although Congress failed to act upon this recommendation, it allowed for the permanent organization of Army military police units in the National Defense Act Amendment of 1920.

In 1917, CPL Charles W. Baltimore, a black MP soldier stationed at Camp Logan in Texas, inquired into the beating of a black soldier by Houston police and was himself beaten and arrested afterwards. The racial tension which followed led to the Houston Riot, which killed four soldiers and sixteen civilians, and 60 black soldiers were executed or sentenced to life in prison.

=== World War II ===
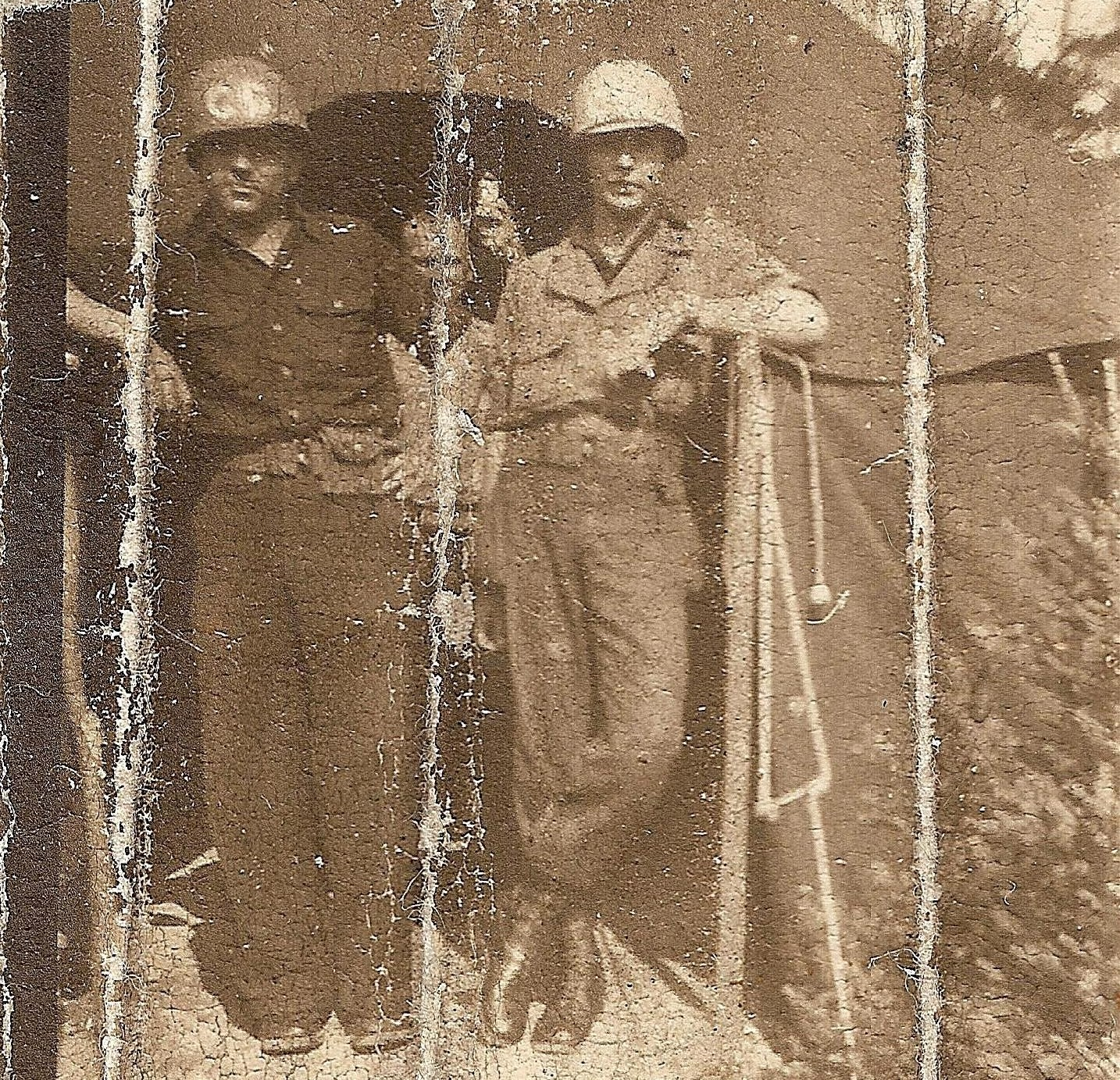
The man standing on the left side of this picture, which was taken in post-WWII Germany, is a West German policeman (at a time when West Germany's police force was just officially created), while the other, standing on the right side, is a Lithuanian-German member of the US Army Military Police.

During World War II, Military Police schools were established at Camp Gordon, Fort Benjamin Harrison, with the Military Police Replacement Center established at Fort Custer. MPs also trained for port security at Fort McHenry. Military Police soldiers moved traffic along the Burma Road, supported amphibious operations on Normandy beachheads, and managed enemy prisoners of war from Italy to the South Pacific.

When the Red Ball Express (a supply route stemming from Normandy to the front lines) was established in August 1944, MP performed route reconnaissance and security to keep the trucks and supplies flowing. This was the 793rd Military Police Battalion's (deactivated in 2014) first mission in theater and commemorated this in their coat of arms and unit insignia; which consists of a field of green, a yellow road, and two red disks symbolizing the famed route.

Thanks to the actions of First Lieutenant John Hyde and his detachment of MP, The Corps was heralded for gallantry at Remagen, as a fighting force in numerous combat actions and as peacekeepers at war's end. In 1944, the Army again saw the need for a unit to investigate crime involving soldiers in Europe. The United States Army Criminal Investigation Division was established as a branch of the Provost Marshal General's Office and has continued investigative activity since.

After the war ended, cavalry units in Germany were utilized to form the United States Constabulary, a police-like patrol organization. It was disbanded in the 1950s.

In 1949, the newly formed Defense Department was in the process of reorganizing the Army and plans were developed to disband the Military Police Corps. But when Congress passed the Army Reorganization Act in May 1950, the Corps survived, remaining a separate branch of the Army.

=== Korean War and Vietnam War ===
When North Korea invaded South Korea in June 1950, there were some MP units stationed in Korea. One of those was the 55th Military Police Company, which had been assigned to Camp Ascom in December 1948. Most of those military police units that arrived during the early months of the war came from Japan, where they were serving as occupation forces following World War II. While the majority of MP companies came from outside Korea, most of the battalions of the Korean War were formed on the peninsula

During the Korean War, Military Police kept supply routes open. Subsequently, Military Police monitored the exchange of prisoners and patrolled the demilitarized zone. Military Police, adapting to a different style of warfare in Vietnam, earned status as a combat support arm, partially as a result of combat success during the Tet Offensive.

=== Current role ===
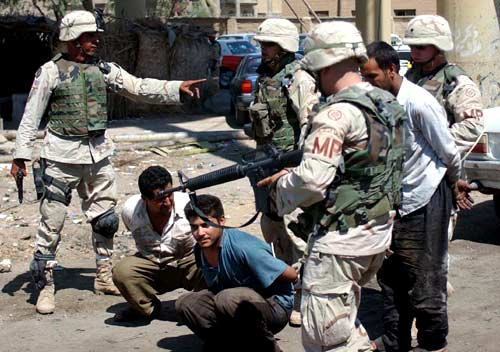
Military police from the 115th Military Police Company doing a vehicle search in Fallujah, July 2003

During Operation Just Cause, Operation Desert Shield and Operation Desert Storm, the Military Police provided area security, conducted battlefield circulation control, and exercised custody over thousands of POWs.

Since 1991, the Military Police have assisted with interventions in Somalia, Haiti and Bosnia. Military Police maintained order in war-torn Kosovo, as well as keeping the peace in Afghanistan.

During the 2003 invasion of Iraq, MPs were used extensively to maintain control over the large numbers of detainees being held by coalition forces, as well as helping to conduct raids, convoy security and regular patrols. MPs were the main force responsible in rebuilding and training the Iraqi Police. Ever since the invasion, military police have been one of the most heavily engaged military occupational specialty in the Iraqi theater.

In the United States, MPs often provided disaster relief and internal security, while still fulfilling their fundamental function of maintaining discipline and security within the Army.

=== Women in the Military Police Corps ===
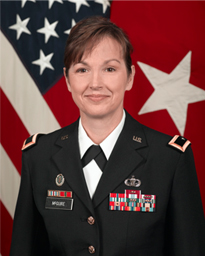
BG Colleen L. McGuire

Women in the Women's Army Auxiliary Corps were assigned Military Police duties as early as 1941. By 1943, soldiers in the Women's Army Corps were trained as Military Police in order to police female soldiers, although they had jurisdiction over all soldiers, including males. Women have since served in the Military Police Corps, which has given the regiment some distinction. (In the 1953 Film Off Limits, Bob Hope plays a character who joins the Military Police so he can train with women.) Females were officially accepted into the Military Police Corps in 1975. As the Women's Auxiliary Corps was disbanded the Military Police stood up to accept and train women alongside their male counterparts. Female MPs have crossed many gender barriers in the United States Armed Forces.

- In the 1983 Invasion of Grenada, 4 female MPs from the 118th Military Police Company (Airborne) were deployed to Grenada. Conflicting views of women in combat caused them to be ordered back to the United States, only to be ordered back to Grenada days later.
- In the 1989 United States invasion of Panama, CPT Linda Bray led the 988th Military Police Company in an assault against Panamanian Defense Forces, and is considered the first woman to lead U.S. troops in combat. CPT Bray was awarded the Commendation Medal for Valor.
- Tulsi Gabbard became the first female to graduate Alabama Military Academy as the OCS distinguished honor graduate in March 2007, and one of the first women combat veterans to serve in United States Congress.
- In 2010, Brigadier General Colleen L. McGuire became the first woman to hold the office of Provost Marshal General of the Army.
- In 2015, CPT Kristen Griest, a military police commissioned officer, became one of the first two women to successfully complete U.S. Army Ranger School.
- SFC Jeanne Balcombe and PFC Tekoa Lurray Brown became the first two female Military Police soldiers killed in the line of duty (both in 1999) to be added to the National Law Enforcement Officers Memorial in Washington, DC (Balcombe: Panel 60-E: 21 Brown: panel 61-E: 21)
- On 27 May 2021, Command Sergeant Major Veronica Knapp, a Military Police soldier, became the first female CSM of a United States Army Division when she assumed the leadership role with the 101st Airborne Division.
- SGT Leigh Ann Hester, an NCO with the Kentucky National Guard’s 617th Military Police Company, became the first woman to earn the Silver Star since WWII for combat valor through her actions on 20 March 2005, in support of Operation IRAQI FREEDOM.

In 2008, 25% of the MP Corps were women. The mixed-gender MP Corps is valued in the wars in Iraq and Afghanistan, where cultural taboos may prevent male soldiers from interacting with women.

== Modern U.S. Army Military Police ==
=== Uniforms ===
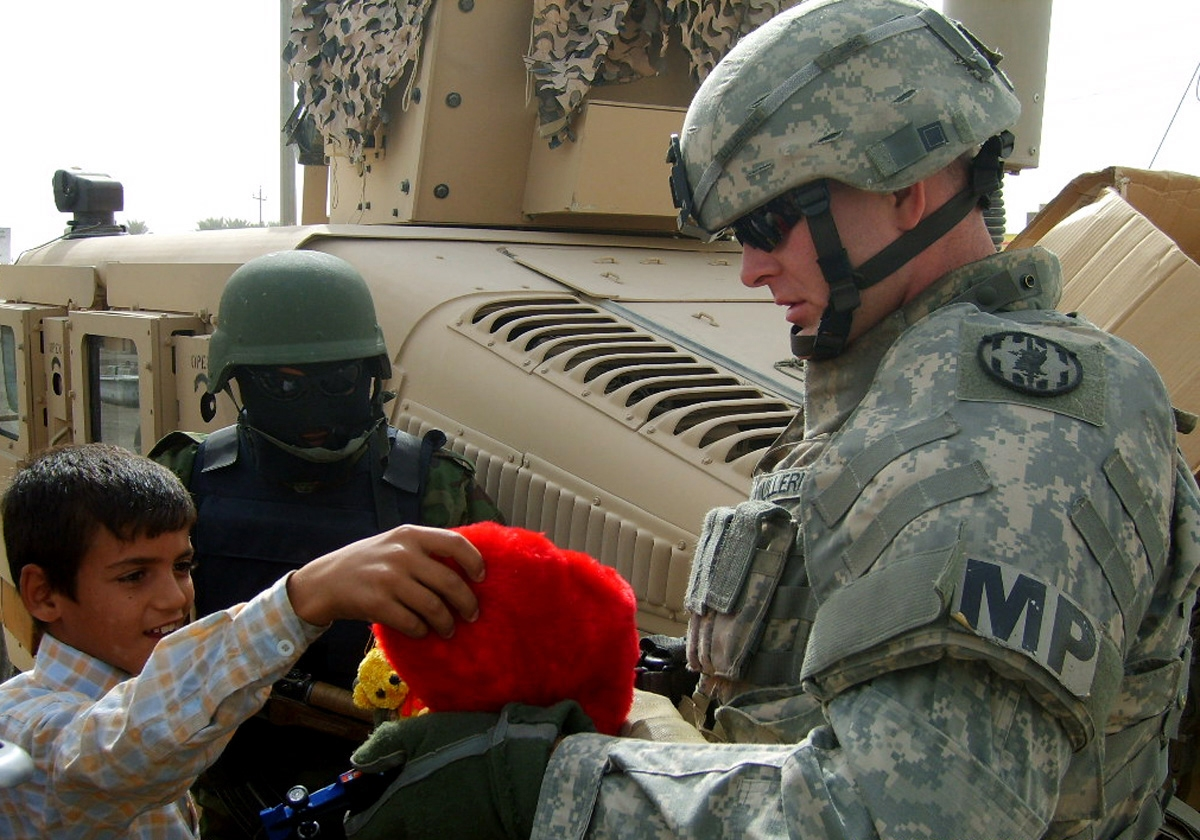
Military Police soldier with an MP brassard bearing the shoulder sleeve insignia of the 89th MP Brigade

In the U.S. Army, a simple patch with the legend "MP" worn on the left arm distinguishes a military-police soldier wearing the Army Combat Uniform (ACU). This patch is attached to the uniform by a hook and loop fastener (i.e. Velcro). For both garrison law-enforcement duty as well as for tactical field work, the patch is a subdued brown with black lettering.

U.S. military police used to be distinguished by a brassard worn on the left arm when on duty in previous uniform versions such as the Battle Dress Uniform. The brassard was black with white lettering for garrison law-enforcement duty and could include extra designations such as "Customs MP" or "K-9 MP" (for dog handlers). Tactical brassards were green with black lettering for temperate climates and sand with light brown lettering for desert duty.

When wearing a Class A or B uniform, they are authorized to wear combat boots instead of regulation low-cut shoes. However, like Airborne soldiers who may only wear the boots while on jump status, MPs may only wear these boots with Class A or B uniforms when performing law enforcement duties.

During World War II, the emblems used were a wide white band around the helmet or a white helmet liner or a white peaked cap, a white webbing Sam Browne belt, white gloves, and white gaiters, atop the standard olive drab uniform. From this clothing, the nickname they were given by the British civilians at the time was "snowdrops." An MP armband was also worn on the left arm, usually black or dark blue with white letters.

=== Weapons ===
The standard personal semi automatic side arm of the United States Army military police, was for many decades the venerable .45 ACP Colt 1911. In 1985 a new service pistol, the 9mm Beretta M9 was used by uniformed MP personnel. In 2019, the US Army announced that the SIG Sauer M17 and M18 would become the main handgun for MPs. Also used are the 5.56 M4 carbine, the 40mm M320 Grenade Launcher Module, the M2 .50cal Machine Gun, the M249 Squad Automatic Weapon (SAW) or M240B, and the Mossberg 500 shotgun or M26 Modular Accessory Shotgun System. MP team leaders are typically assigned an M4 with an M320 attached, drivers are assigned an M249 and gunners are assigned an M4 in addition to any other crew-served weapons they are responsible for. Crew-served or vehicle-based weapons used by MP fireteams include the M2 Browning machine gun, M240B, and Mk 19 grenade launcher. MP teams often carry one or two AT4 anti-tank weapons, as well.

Military Police also utilize the use of PEDD (Patrol Explosive Detection Dogs) and SSD (Specialized Search Dogs) K9 Military Working Dogs.

=== Units ===
A U.S. Army Spc., with the 42nd Military Police Detachment, 16th Military Police Brigade, checks a driver's license at Fort Bragg, N.C.

Military Police are considered maneuver support, and MP units may be organized at many different levels, based on the size of the unit it is meant to support. An Army Corps may contain one MP brigade, which is responsible for training and supplying subordinate Military Police units. When MP units are deployed, their parent unit may maintain administrative control (ADCON) while relinquishing tactical control (TACON) to the deployed unit being supported.

=== Military Police Investigations ===
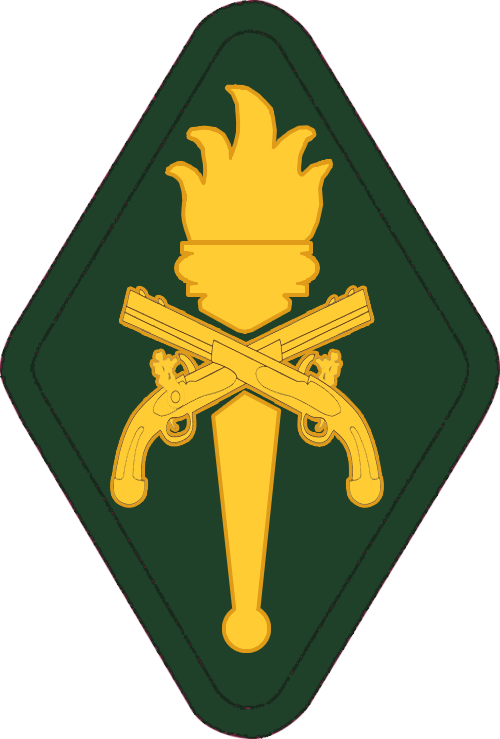
US Army Military Police School SSI

Investigations are conducted by Military Police Investigators or Special Agents with the United States Army Criminal Investigation Division (USACID), commonly referred to as CID. The Military Police Investigations (MPI) office is responsible for the investigation of all misdemeanor and several felony crimes including aggravated assault, housebreaking, and larcenies under a thousand dollars committed within an area of military jurisdiction or violations of military law committed by military personnel anywhere (Title 10 Section 805, UCMJ Article 5). MPI Investigators (31B ASI V5) are MPs who attend the Military Police Investigations course at the Military Police School, located at Fort Leonard Wood, Missouri. Army CID is the Department of the Army’s criminal investigative organization, reporting directly to the Under Secretary of the Army. CID Special Agents investigate felony crimes, regardless of the incident location, which have an Army nexus.

=== Special Reaction Teams ===
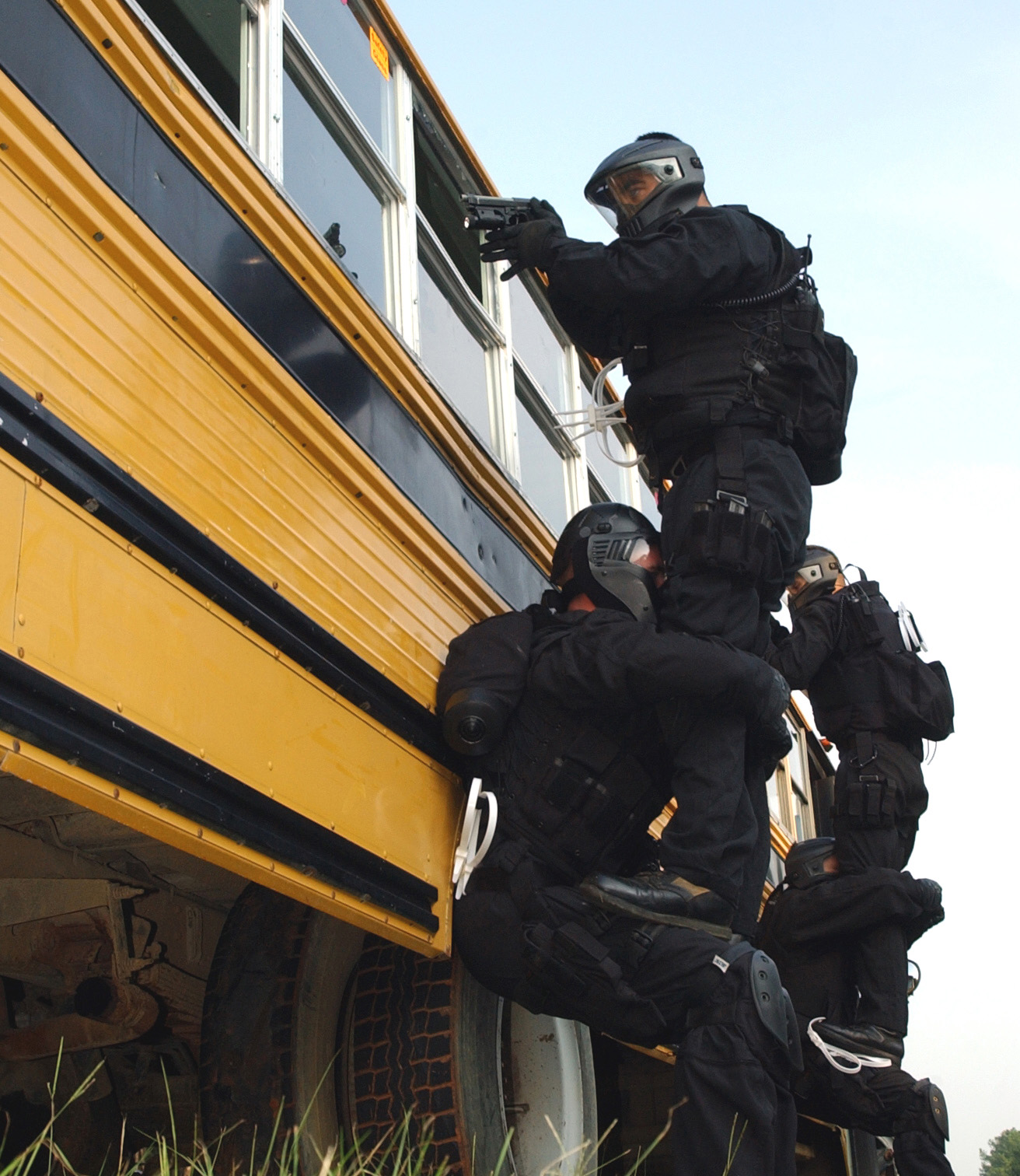
Soldiers from the 42nd Military Police Detachment's Special Reaction during an anti-terrorism exercise at Fort Bragg in 2005.

The United States Army has proponency via FM 19-10 for the special reaction team mission for the Army Military Police Navy, Coast Guard, Air Force, Marine Corps that responds to the highest-risk situations within a military base or compound.

The SRT units in the United States Department of Defense are equivalents of civilian police department SRT units and Special Response Teams, and receive their training at the Military Police Corps School at Fort Leonard Wood, Missouri.

== Heraldic items ==
=== Branch insignia ===
Branch Insignia

1. Two crossed gold color flintlock pistols 3/4 inch in height.
2. The insignia was approved in 1922.
3. The M1805 pistol, sometimes referred to as the Harper's Ferry Pistol (Harper's Ferry Model 1805;!made at the Harper's Ferry Arsenal), was selected since it was the first American military pistol and remained the Army model for many years. The parts of this weapon were standardized and inter-changeable, thereby marking an advance in arms production.

=== Branch plaque ===
Branch Plaque

- The plaque design has the branch insignia, letters, and rim in gold. The background is green.

=== Regimental insignia ===
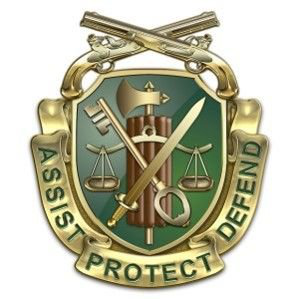
Regimental Insignia

1. A gold color metal and enamel device 1 3/16 inches in height consisting of a shield blazoned as follows: Vert, a fasces palewise, axe Or and rods Proper (brown), thereover in fess a balance and in saltire overall a key with bow in sinister base and a sword with hilt in dexter base all of the second.
2. The shield is enclosed at bottom and sides by a gold scroll of three folds inscribed ASSIST PROTECT DEFEND in green letters and surmounted at the top by two crossed gold pistols.
3. The regimental insignia was approved on 3 July 1986.

=== Regimental coat of arms ===
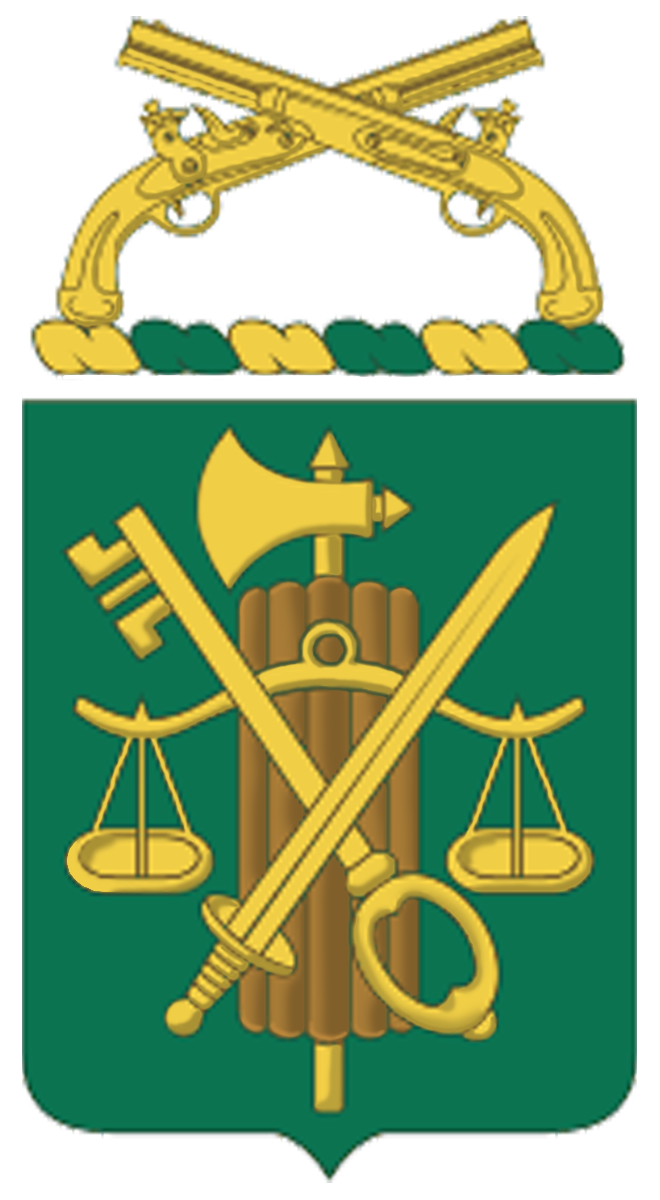
Regimental Coat of Arms

- Description
1. The coat of arms appears on the breast of a displayed eagle on the regimental flag.
2. The coat of arms is: Vert, a fasces palewise, axe Or and rods Proper (brown); thereover in fess a balance and in saltire overall a key with bow in sinister base and a sword with hilt in dexter base all of the second.
3. The crest (On a wreath of the colors Or and Vert a pair of crossed pistols of the first) is displayed above the eagle's head.
4. The background color of the flag is green and the fringe is yellow. The coat of arms was approved on 2 May 1986.
- Symbolism
1. Green and gold are the colors associated with the Military Police Corps.
2. The fasces is an ancient symbol of authority related to a Roman magistrate.
3. The balance is symbolic of equal justice under law and the key signifies security.
4. The sword represents the military.
5. The crossed pistols are the symbol of the Military Police Corps mission: to uphold the law and to keep order.
6. The motto ASSIST, PROTECT, DEFEND reflects the mission.

=== Branch colors ===
- Green piped with gold.
1. The color yellow piped with green was assigned to the Military Police by Army Regulation 600-35 dated 20 April 1922.
2. With the establishment of gold for the Armor and the use of green for the insignia on the Armor flag, the colors for the Military Police were reversed.
3. The current colors, green piped with gold, were assigned by Army Regulation 600-60-1 dated 26 October 1951.

== In popular culture ==
- The novels by Lee Child tell the story of Jack Reacher, a former U.S. Army military police major who commanded CID special agents.
- The GI Joe Characters Law & Order are an Army Military Police Officer and K9 team.
- The GI Joe character Chuckles is an Army CID Special Agent - Criminal Investigator.
- The 1992 novel by Nelson DeMille titled The General's Daughter tells the story of Army CID Special Agent Paul Brenner. The book was made into a movie of the same name in 1999 starring John Travolta in the role of Brenner.
- The 2003 film Basic has the character Army Captain Julia Osborne, played by Connie Nielsen, investigating a murder for CID.
- Throughout seasons 4 and 5, of the CBS drama NCIS, Army CID Agent Hollis Mann makes six appearances. She was a Lieutenant Colonel.
- Stana Katic played Army CID Special Agent Adrian Lane in one episode of the CBS military drama The Unit, in the ninth episode of its third season.
- The 2019 thriller novel The Deserter by Nelson DeMille features Army CID Special Agent Scott Brodie as its main character.
- Willem Dafoe and Gregory Hines played U.S. Army CID Special Agents in the 1988 mystery thriller film Off Limits.
- In the 2017 first-person shooter Rising Storm 2: Vietnam, players can wear military police uniform and helmets while playing as U.S Army, if they have Rear Echelon Cosmetic DLC installed.
- The A-Team was being chased by the Military Police for most of the series' run.

The Presidio was a movie about 2 CID agents investigating a crime in San Francisco.

== See also ==
- Department of the Air Force Police
- Department of the Army Civilian Police
- List of United States Army Military Police Corps units
- List of United States federal law enforcement agencies
- Master-at-arms (United States Navy)
- Military law
- Military police § United States
- Military Police Regimental Association
- United States Air Force Security Forces
- United States Coast Guard Police
- United States Constabulary (gendarmerie)
- United States Marine Corps Civilian Police
- United States Pentagon Police
