= Harper's Ferry flintlock pistol =

1805 handgun

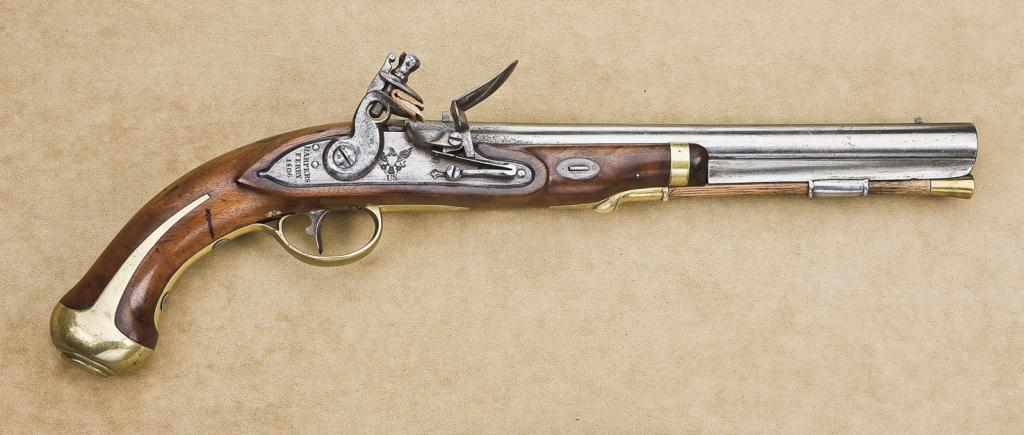
- Harper's Ferry Model 1805
- Type: Flintlock pistol
- Place of origin: United States

Service history
- In service: 1803–1865
- Used by: United States of America; Confederate States of America
- Wars: War of 1812; Seminole Wars; Texan Revolution; Mexican–American War; American Civil War

Production history
- Manufacturer: Harper's Ferry Armory
- No. built: 4,200
- Variants: Model 1805, Model 1806, Model 1807, Model 1808, Model 1836

Specifications
- Cartridge: Paper cartridge
- Caliber: .54
- Action: Flintlock
- Rate of fire: User dependent
- Feed system: Muzzle-loaded

The Harper's Ferry Model 1805 U.S. martial flintlock pistol manufactured at the Harpers Ferry Armory in Virginia (now West Virginia) was the first pistol manufactured by an American national armory. It was the standard handgun of the U.S. Dragoons during the War of 1812.

== Specifications ==
Harper's Ferry 1805, 1806, 1807 and 1808 flintlock pistols were all essentially identical, and the design has similarities with the Model 1803 rifles also produced at Harpers Ferry. The M1805 pistol was a .54 caliber, single-shot, smoothbore, flintlock pistol intended for field duty. Harper's Ferry model 1805–1808 flintlock pistols were known then as “horsemen’s pistols” and were produced in pairs; both pistols having identical serial numbers. With just one shot readily available without reloading, a pair or "brace" was the standard issue. Horse accouterments also included a standard pair of saddle holsters. No serial number higher than 2048 has ever been discovered—and that is exactly half of the number recorded as produced at the Harper's Ferry Armory. There are between 200–300 of these pistols known to exist today.

== War of 1812 ==
During the War of 1812, the M1805 pistol was issued to American cavalry. Due to the high demand for weapons, a variety of single shot flintlock pistols were manufactured in some of the states, especially Pennsylvania and Connecticut. Some featured improvements such as iron instead of wood ramrods.

== Later developments ==
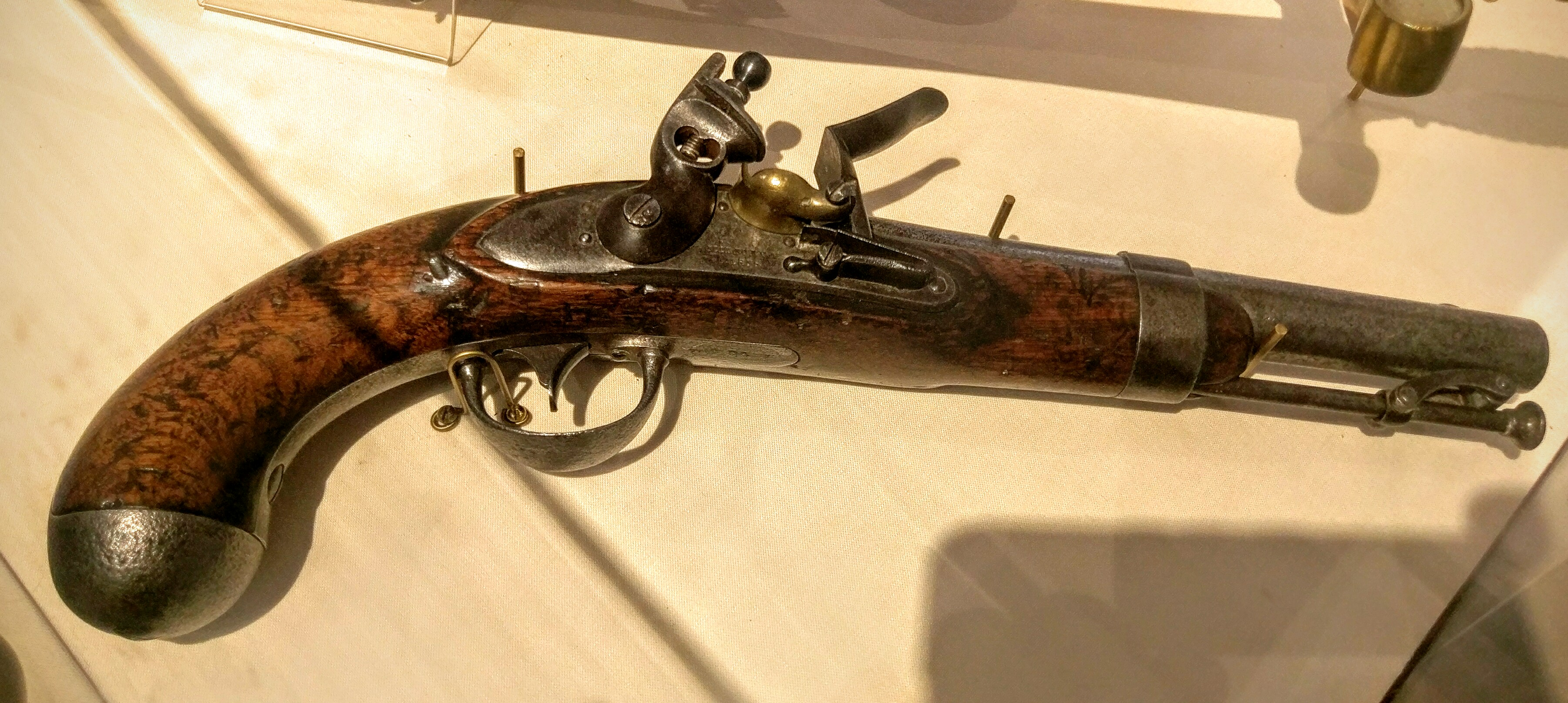
U.S. Model 1836 Flintlock Pistol

The U.S. military subsequently used a variety of flintlock pistols produced by government contractors, especially Simeon North of Connecticut, between 1808 and 1844. The last of these was the U.S. Model 1836. A caplock version of the M1836 pistol, the U.S. Model 1842, was issued to the Dragoons during the Seminole War and US-Mexican War until the Colt Dragoon revolver was introduced in 1848. The last U.S. martial single shot muzzleloading pistol was the U.S. Springfield Model 1855, a .58 caliber handgun manufactured at the Springfield Armory with a detachable shoulder stock designed for use by US dragoons during the Indian Wars. By that period, revolvers had become the preferred sidearms for mounted troops.

Single shot muzzleloading pistols were widely used by gunfighters and mountain men in the early days of the Old West, including Kit Carson. Many were also issued to the Confederate army during the American Civil War. Lawrence O'Bryan Branch was carrying a pair of Model 1836 pistols when he was killed by a Union army sniper in 1862.

== Modern use ==
Currently manufactured reproductions of the original pistols are made with a larger caliber than the original, as well as a rifled bore for more accurate shooting. There is one reproduction available modeled after the percussion converted Harper's Ferry pistols that is built with the correct .54 caliber smooth bore as well.

US Military Police Corps Branch Insignia bearing crossed Model 1805s

The Model 1805 U.S. Marshal "Harper's Ferry" flintlock pistol is used today on the insignia of the U.S. Army Military Police Corps.
