= 1792 contract rifle =

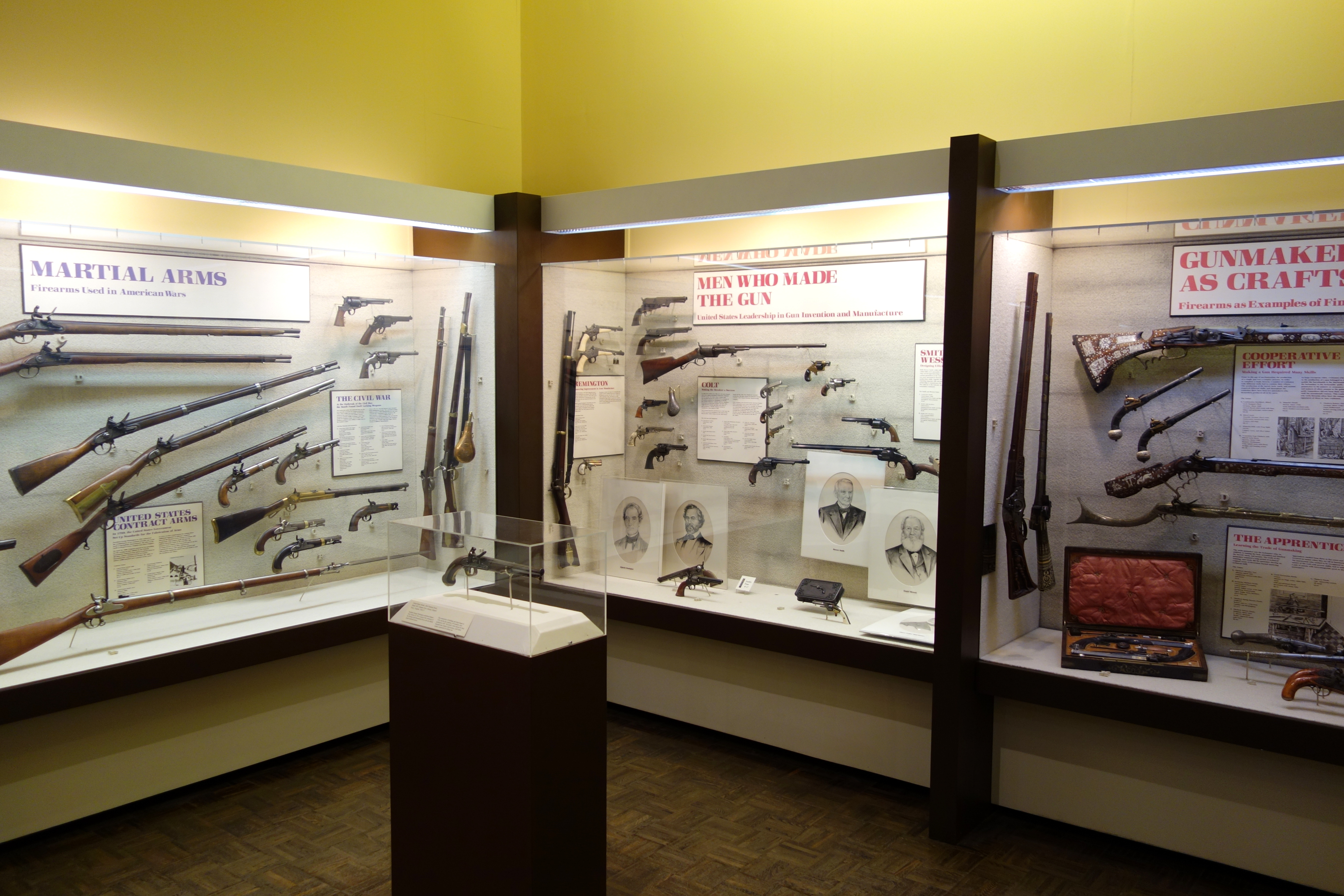
- Several contract rifles at the Huntington Museum of Art
- Type: Muzzle-loading rifle
- Place of origin: United States

Service history
- In service: 1792–?
- Wars: War of 1812, Mexican–American War, American Civil War

Production history
- Manufacturer: Primarily Pennsylvania gunsmiths.
- Unit cost: $12
- Produced: 1792–1794
- No. built: approximately 3500

Specifications
- Barrel length: 42 inches
- Caliber: .49
- Action: Flintlock
- Feed system: Muzzle loaded

The 1792 contract rifle is not a specific model of gun, rather it is a modern way to categorize a collection of rifles bought by the United States government in that year. United States 1792 contract rifles are Pennsylvania-Kentucky rifles with a 42-inch long octagonal barrel in .49 caliber, with a patch box built into the buttstock. What distinguishes them from civilian rifles is that they were bought by the government under military contract.

== History ==
Before the United States military used standardized weapons with interchangeable parts, it bought rifles that are difficult to distinguish from their civilian equivalent. The process was similar today, in which the government requests weaponry of certain specifications and then finds a manufacturer to build them. In 1792 there was a need for rifles, and a contract was drawn up with Lancaster, Pennsylvania, gunsmiths to deliver rifles.

In January 1792, U.S. Secretary of War Henry Knox authorized former General Edward Hand to contract with manufacturers for the rifles. The rifles were to be delivered in units of 100 as quickly as possible. He told Hand that the contract was for 500 rifles, but that he was willing to extend it to 1,000. The 1792 contract specified rifles with a 44-1/2 inch long barrel in .47 caliber. That was modified to a 42-inch long barrel in .49 caliber, with a well-seasoned maple stock and a flintlock. Eleven different gunsmiths took the contract on, delivering 1,476 rifles between April 1792 and December 1792. A second contract for the same weapon took place in 1794. Seventeen gunsmiths delivered 2,000 rifles by November 1794.

These military- or militia-issued rifles were of civilian style, and it has been very difficult for collectors to identify them from this contract. Edward Flanagan, who wrote a paper on the 1792 and 1807 contract rifles, believes that the weapons were marked by the U.S. government, a lesson learned from gun thefts during the Revolutionary War. He points to a "US" stamp on the barrel of a weapon known to have been a contract rifle.

A second contract rifle has been identified, the 1807 Contract Rifle, which has different specifications than the weapons of 1792 and 1794.

=== Lewis and Clark ===
Before their exploratory trip, the Lewis and Clark Expedition obtained rifles from the Harper's Ferry Arsenal. The U.S. Army's acknowledges that there were 300 of the 1792 or 1794 contract rifles at the arsenal at that time. The Army refers to modern speculation that the changes Lewis had made to the contract rifles (adding sling swivels, shortening the barrel further to 33-36 inches and reboring them to a larger caliber), led to the design of the US Model 1803, created six months later.

== See also ==
- List of individual weapons of the U.S. Armed Forces
