= Springfield Model 1812 Musket =

Springfield Model 1812
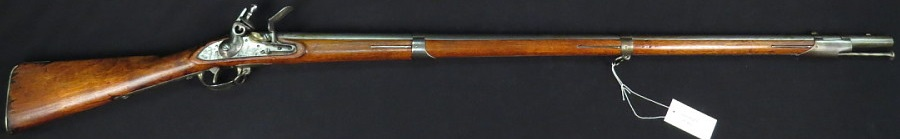
- Type: Flintlock musket Percussion lock musket (conversion)
- Place of origin: United States

Service history
- In service: 1814–1865
- Used by: United States; Republic of Texas (Long Republic); Confederate States
- Wars: American Indian Wars; Seminole Wars; Long's Expedition of 1820; Anti-piracy in Caribbean; Mexican–American War; American Civil War

Production history
- Designer: Eli Whitney
- Designed: 1812
- Manufacturer: Springfield Armory; Various private contractors
- Produced: 1814–1816
- No. built: c. 30,000

Specifications
- Mass: 9 lb (4.1 kg)
- Length: 58 in (1,500 mm)
- Barrel length: 42 in (1,100 mm)
- Cartridge: Paper cartridge, buck and ball/musket ball (.65/16.510 mm) undersized to reduce the effects of powder fouling
- Caliber: .69 in (17.526 mm)
- Action: Flintlock/percussion lock (conversion)
- Rate of fire: User dependent; usually 2 to 3 rounds per minute
- Muzzle velocity: 1,000 ft/s (300 m/s) to 1,200 ft/s (370 m/s)
- Effective firing range: 50 to 100 yd (46 to 91 m)
- Maximum firing range: 150 to 300 yd (140 to 270 m)
- Feed system: Muzzle-loaded
- Sights: A front sight cast into the upper barrel band

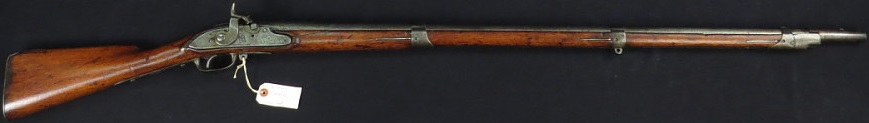
Springfield Model 1812 percussion lock conversion

The Springfield Model 1812 was a .69 caliber flintlock musket manufactured by the United States in the early 19th century.

== Overview ==
The War of 1812 revealed many weaknesses in the earlier Springfield Model 1795. The Model 1812 was an attempt to improve both the design and manufacturing process of the musket. The design borrowed heavily from the French Charleville Model 1777. The Model 1812 arrived too late to be of use in the War of 1812 but would later become standard to regular infantry and militia units. But the Springfield M1808 flintlock musket, Type II, filled the need for a weapon for new recruits.

In an effort to enhance musket performance and standardize manufacturing processes, U.S. armories introduced the Model 1812 musket to rectify deficiencies identified during the Second Anglo-American conflict. Throughout the 1810s and until 1822, transitional muskets were produced by gradually using remaining Model 1795 components.

The Model 1812 was a .69 caliber smoothbore musket, with a 42-inch (110 cm) barrel and a 54-inch (140 cm) stock, and a total length of 58 inches (150 cm). The Model 1812 was produced only at Springfield Armory and by independent contractors: the Model 1795 would continue in production at Harpers Ferry Armory into 1819.

== History ==
The Model 1812 was produced in a quantity of almost 30,000 between the years 1814 and 1816. Springfield manufactured a total of 9,522 Model 1815 Muskets utilizing the "Wickham type" configuration.

The Flintlock Militia Musket contract, crafted by J. Bishop, manufactured circa 1832, was specifically commissioned for the Philadelphia militia, is designated as unrelated Model 12. The musket bears a resemblance to the British Brown Bess, reflecting the prevailing provincial sentiment regarding the limited standing army of that era. Produced exemplifies the significant role played by contract musket manufacturers in equipping the nascent United State militia. It was used for the Texas War of Independence.

Some Model 1812 muskets were converted to percussion lock firing mechanisms as the percussion cap system was much more reliable and weather resistant than the flintlock system used on the Model 1812 in its original configuration.

It was replaced by the Springfield Model 1816. However, the Model 1812 remained in service for many years, and was even used in the early Florida campaigns and American Civil War, mostly by the Confederate forces. By the start of the Civil war, the weapon was considered to be old and obsolete but was needed to fill arms shortages.

== See also ==
- Springfield musket

Preceded by Springfield Model 1795	United States military musket 1812-1816	Succeeded by Springfield Model 1816
