= Model 1795 Musket =

Springfield Model 1795
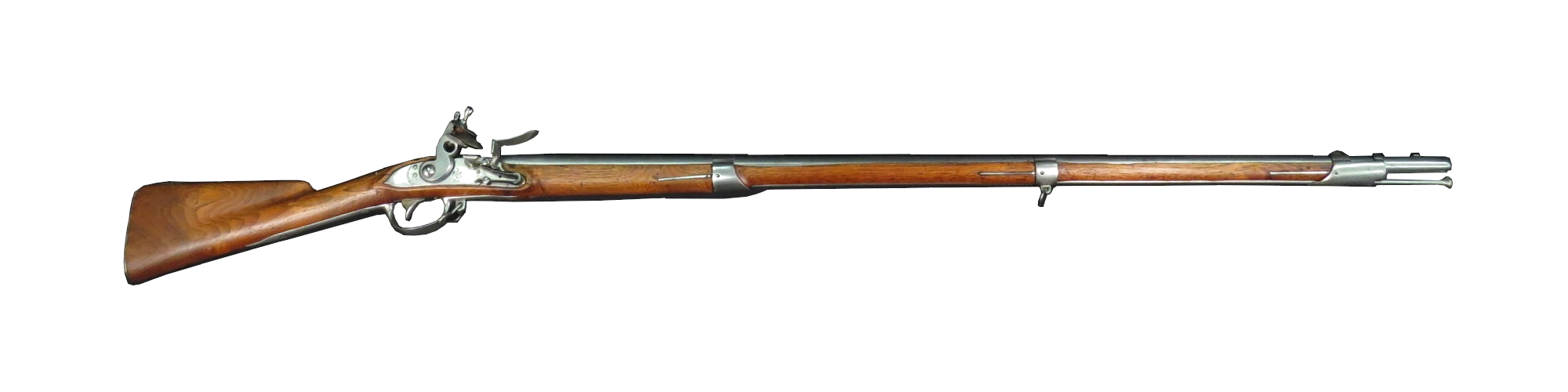
- Type: Musket
- Place of origin: United States

Service history
- In service: 1795–1865
- Used by: United States; Confederate States; Texan revolutionaries
- Wars: American Indian Wars; Quasi-War; Barbary Wars; War of 1812; Texan Revolt of 1812–1813; U.S. filibuster incursions in Florida; Mexican–American War; American Civil War

Production history
- Designer: Eli Whitney
- Designed: 1795
- Manufacturer: Springfield Armory; Harpers Ferry Armory; Various private contractors
- Produced: 1795–1818
- No. built: c. 150,000

Specifications
- Mass: 10 lb (4.5 kg)
- Length: 60.0 in (1,520 mm)
- Barrel length: 42.0 in (1,070 mm) to 45.0 in (1,140 mm)
- Cartridge: Paper cartridge, buck and ball/musket ball (.65/16.510 mm) undersized to reduce the effects of powder fouling
- Caliber: .69 in (17.526 mm)
- Action: Flintlock/percussion lock (conversion)
- Rate of fire: User dependent; usually 2 to 3 rounds per minute
- Muzzle velocity: 1,000 ft/s (300 m/s) to 1,200 ft/s (370 m/s)
- Effective firing range: 50 to 100 yd (46 to 91 m)
- Maximum firing range: 150 to 300 yd (140 to 270 m)
- Feed system: Muzzle-loaded
- Sights: A front sight cast into the upper barrel band

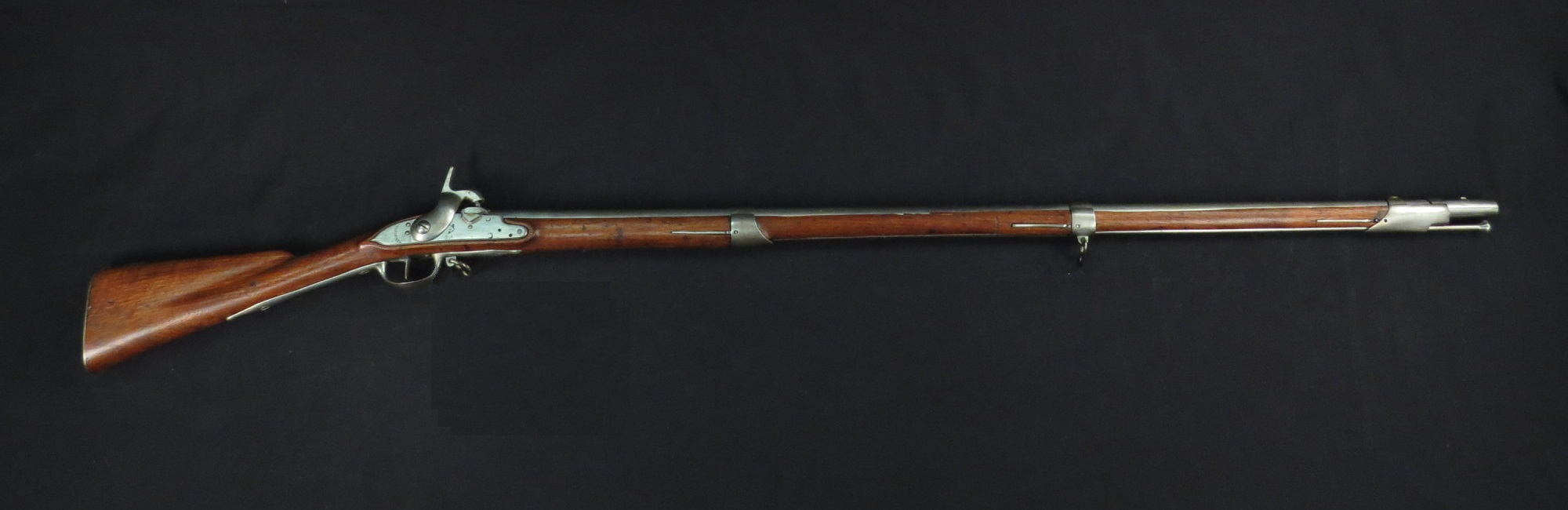
Springfield Model 1795 percussion lock conversion

The Springfield Model 1795 was a .69 caliber flintlock musket manufactured in the late 18th and early 19th centuries in the United States.

The Model 1795 was the first musket to be produced in the United States by Eli Whitney at both the Springfield and Harpers Ferry armories. Officially detonate as “US musket, Charlesville pattern". It was based heavily on the Charleville Model 1763/66 which had been imported in large numbers from the French during the American Revolution and which at the time comprised the largest number of muskets in U.S. arsenals at about 20,000 muskets. The Model 1795 was used in the War of 1812, after which shortcomings in both the design and manufacturing process of the Model 1795 led to the development of the Springfield Model 1812 at Springfield only, available Model 1808 were issued to the states by the Federal Government under the Militia Act of 1808, and eventually the Springfield Model 1816 at both armories.

== Characteristics ==
The Model 1795, a very elongated musket, retained many of the characteristics of the Charleville on which it was based. It had a 44 inches (110 cm) long .69 caliber barrel, a 56 inches (140 cm) long stock, and a total length of 60 inches (150 cm). The original version had the bayonet lug on the bottom of the barrel but this was later moved to the top. Minor changes were made throughout production inclusive of a shorter barrel length of 42 inches (110 cm) on the later Harpers Ferry weapons. Barrels of Harpers Ferry Model 1795 muskets were serial numbered up to some point in 1812: Springfield Model 1795 muskets were never serial numbered. Springfield began the Model 1812 improvements in 1814, but Harpers Ferry continued on with the production of the Model 1795 until at least 1819 (early 1819 examples still used the Model 1795 lockplate) and never produced the Model 1812.

Eventually, both armories incorporated improvements into the Model 1816 flintlock which were after a few years virtually identical. Most, but not all, parts will interchange on the Model 1816 muskets but the hand-crafted parts, and lack of set standards and patterns on the earlier Model 1795 weapons often means parts will not interchange easily.

Typical of smoothbore muskets, the Model 1795 had an effective range of about 50 to 100 yards (46–91 m). The Model 1795 fired a smaller round ball than the British .75 caliber Brown Bess, but the Model 1795 also had both a slightly longer range and slightly better accuracy than the Brown Bess musket. This gave the American forces an advantage of range when they faced British forces in the War of 1812.

== Production ==
The Model 1795 was manufactured at the United States Armory and Arsenal at Springfield, which was the first armory in the United States, at least as early as 1799. Earlier versions prior to this date probably were produced but were not dated. Starting in 1801, possibly as early as 1800, it was also produced in the then new United States Armory and Arsenal at Harpers Ferry. Several differences between the Springfield Model 1795 and the Harpers Ferry Model 1795 have led many to label the Harpers Ferry version as a significantly different model.

Type I, earliest Springfield-produced muskets with characteristic features such as oval-shaped trigger guards and distinctive lock and stock markings. Undated Type I (1795-1798/1799) were likely made using salvaged parts from the Philadelphia and Schuylkill Arsenals, particularly during early armory development when fully fabricated parts were still limited. Type II, Introduced refinements in barrel bands, lock mechanisms, and stock shaping, reflecting improvements in mass production efficiency. Type III, Features further standardization and some transitional elements bridging early and late production models. Type IV, The final type of Model 1795 series before the transition to the Model 1812 and it's Model 1808 predecessor, often incorporating the most advanced manufacturing improvements of the period.

Quite a few independent contractors also made the weapon as they were in constant demand. The federal armories simply could not make enough muskets to meet demand with the labor force they had during these early years. Only about two dozen artisans worked in the Harpers Ferry arsenal around 1800, and making the muskets from raw materials was a very labor-intensive task. Approximately 80,000 Springfield Model 1795 muskets were produced while about 70,000 were produced at Harpers Ferry.

== Service history ==
Model 1795 muskets were used throughout Franco-American War of 1798–1800, the War of 1812, the Mexican–American War of 1846–1848, and the American Civil War of 1861–1865.

The Model 1795 was largely phased out in favor of the Model 1812 and Model 1816 in the U.S. military, and it ended up being smuggled to Texas prior to and during the War of Independence.

Some were converted to percussion locks either at the armories or by private individuals as the percussion cap was system much more reliable and weather resistant than the flintlock. However, records reflect that many in the South were issued an original flintlock at the beginning of the Civil War until the Confederates could convert them to percussion lock. There is evidence that some were in fact never converted at all from flintlock. The effective service life of the Model 1795 thus extends through 1865.

The Model 1795 was also used by some members of the Lewis and Clark expedition.

== See also ==
- Springfield musket

Preceded by Charleville musket	United States military musket 1795-1812	Succeeded by Springfield Model 1812 Musket
