= Harpers Ferry Model 1803 =

Harper's Ferry M1803 - (33" barrel, 49" overall.)
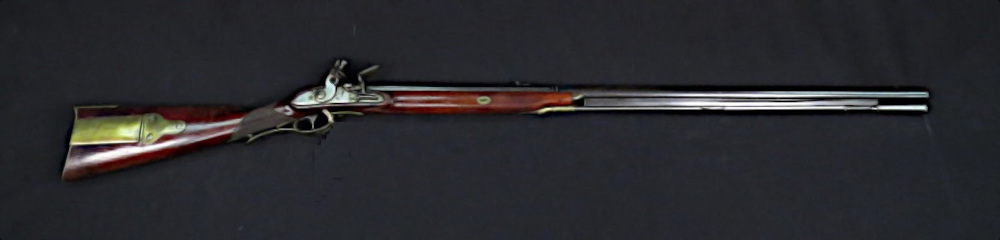
- Type: Muzzle-loading rifle
- Place of origin: United States

Service history
- In service: 1803-1841
- Wars: War of 1812, Mexican–American War, American Civil War

Production history
- Manufacturer: Harper's Ferry Armory
- Produced: 1803-06, 1814-19
- No. built: ~20,000
- Variants: Types 1-3

Specifications
- Mass: 9 lbs (4.082 kg)
- Barrel length: 33" (838 mm)
- Cartridge: .525 (13.335 mm)
- Caliber: .54 (13.716 mm)
- Action: Flintlock/percussion lock (conversion)
- Feed system: Muzzle-loaded

The Harper's Ferry M1803 rifle was the first standard rifle (as opposed to a smoothbore musket), made by an American armory.

== History ==
Rifles existed long before the 17th century, but were rarely used by military forces. In order to be effective, the round in a rifle had to fit snugly into the barrel. This would allow the round to grip the barrel's rifling as the weapon was fired, and the rifling would impart a spin onto the round which would make it more stable and accurate. However, 16th and 17th century weapons were muzzle loaded, and the black powder that was used at the time would quickly foul the barrel. Rifles, with their tight fitting rounds, would quickly become unusable. Smooth bore muskets with looser fitting rounds were much less accurate, but did not suffer from this problem. Armies therefore tended to favor smooth bore weapons.

The U.S. military did however take note of the accuracy of rifles. The accuracy of American long rifles like the Pennsylvania and Kentucky rifles far exceeded that of any smooth bore weapon. Rifles would not replace muskets on the battlefield until the invention of the Minie Ball solved the problem of barrel fouling, but prior to that, many rifles were used by U.S. forces.

The first rifles used were imported from foreign gun makers. In 1803, Secretary of War Henry Dearborn wrote about the utility of a short barreled rifle, it being easier to charge enemy positions with, and "less likely to foul by firing". He specified that the new rifle that should "not exceed 33 inches" and have a ball "one thirtieth of a pound weight, about .54 caliber". Under Dearborn's direction, the war department issued an order for the new rifle on May 25, 1803. Joseph Perkin, superintendent of the recently created Harper's Ferry Armory, was placed in charge of the design of the new rifle. Perkin and several other armorers created several patterns from Dearborn's instructions, and in November 1803 these patterns were presented to the War Department. With a few minor changes, one of these patterns was approved and became the M1803 rifle. Dearborn was so impressed that he complimented Perkin for submitting such "an excellent pattern", and an order was placed for 2,000 rifles. Based on the rifle's success and performance, Dearborn later expanded the production from 2,000 to 4,000 rifles. In November 1805, Dearborn also asked Perkin to create a horseman's pistol that was in many ways a scaled down version of the M1803 rifle.

Perkin and Dearborn originally planned to produce 2,000 rifles per year. The rifle proved to be more difficult to produce than expected, due to mechanical difficulties as well as a large amount of handwork required to finish each rifle. Production was also slowed by outbreaks of malaria in the summers of 1805 and 1806, which reduced the available manpower at Harpers Ferry. The order of 4,000 rifles was eventually completed in 1807.

A second production run was ordered in 1814. This production lasted until 1819, and a total of 15,703 rifles were produced at this time.

The M1803 rifle was later replaced by the M1814 common rifle, the M1817 common rifle and the M1819 rifle, when it was decided that a more rugged weapon was needed.

== Design features ==
The M1803 rifle used a flintlock firing mechanism. Some were later converted to percussion cap in the mid-19th century.

The barrel of the M1803 rifle was intentionally short. While this made the weapon less accurate than a long rifle like the Pennsylvania or Kentucky rifle, the shorter barrel did not suffer as much from loading problems due to fouling. The barrel was octagon to round in shape, and was 33 inches in length, per Dearborn's specification. The weapon fired a .54 caliber round. Later rifles had a 36-inch barrel.

The stock was made out of walnut wood, and featured a well defined comb and a narrow wrist. The stock contained a brass patch box, and brass furniture was used throughout the rifle.

The rifle was 49 inches in length. Later rifles had a longer barrel, which increased their overall length to 52 inches.

== Variants ==
=== Early production ===
Some historians believe that a small number of early 1803 type rifles were produced for the Lewis and Clark expedition. It is also possible that contract rifles of 1794 were modified at the arsenal at Harper's Ferry, by shortening the barrels and reboring and rerifling them to .54 caliber. The records at the arsenal are not exact on the matter, as it appears the first 1803 prototype was produced six months after Lewis departed Maryland. The later 1803 rifles had a slightly lighter barrel than the first production run version, and had other slight differences such as a thinner lock plate and a narrower trigger guard. The barrel was 36 inches in length on the second version.

=== First production run ===
The first production run rifles had a 33-inch barrel. Early models had the bottom of the octagon portion of the barrel rounded. In 1805 this was changed and the bottoms were left octagonal, which resulted in a slightly heavier barrel. The wood screws used were hand forged. All first production run rifles were given a serial number.

=== Second production run ===
Several minor changes were made for the second production run. The barrel length was increased to 36 inches. Minor changes were made to the trigger, and the lock plate and hammer were significantly modified. The patch box was increased in size. All screws were machine made instead of hand forged. The second production run rifles were not given a serial number,

== Lewis and Clark controversy ==
The rifle was cited as being carried by Lewis and Clark on their expedition in a National Park Service pamphlet park-service by historian Carl P. Russell. He wrote that it is known "that Lewis picked up some of the new M1803 rifles in preparation for the expedition". Since then there has been controversy over that statement. Some have claimed that none of the M1803 rifles would have been available, and that the expedition would have taken shortened U.S. 1792 or 1794 contract rifles. Others have claimed that the expedition took pre-production rifles, prototypes for the M1803 rifle. Still others think that the 1792 contract rifles that the expedition modified and took were the inspiration for the rifles that became the M1803 rifle.

== Use ==
Regardless of its use by Lewis and Clark, the rifle was carried into battle at York during the War of 1812 by the men of the 1st U.S. Regiment of Rifles, led by Benjamin Forsyth. Leading the American landing, they inflicted heavy casualties on the 8th Regiment of Foot, practically wiping out its grenadier company. It was presumably issued to the other companies of the Regiment, such as that under Daniel Appling. It would thus have seen good service throughout many engagements, including the American victory at Big Sandy Creek. Also during the War of 1812, Harrison's scout Peter Navarre carried an 1803 rifle which is still in possession of the Toledo Public Library. Peter posed with the rifle in several photographs taken in preparation for his painted portrait by William Henry Machen which still hangs at the Toledo Public Library. By the time it was replaced by the M1817 rifle and the M1819 rifle, the M1803 rifle had been carried by regular army troops throughout what would later become Kansas, Arkansas, New Mexico, Oklahoma, Colorado, Nebraska, South Dakota and Texas. It influenced the market so that smaller rifles became more common, and inspired civilian gunmakers, who made the plains rifles and mountain rifles, used in the west by the mountain men and explorers and everywhere by civilians as sport rifles.

== See also ==
- Rifles in the American Civil War
