= Patch box (firearms) =

Patch box storage on compartment on firearms

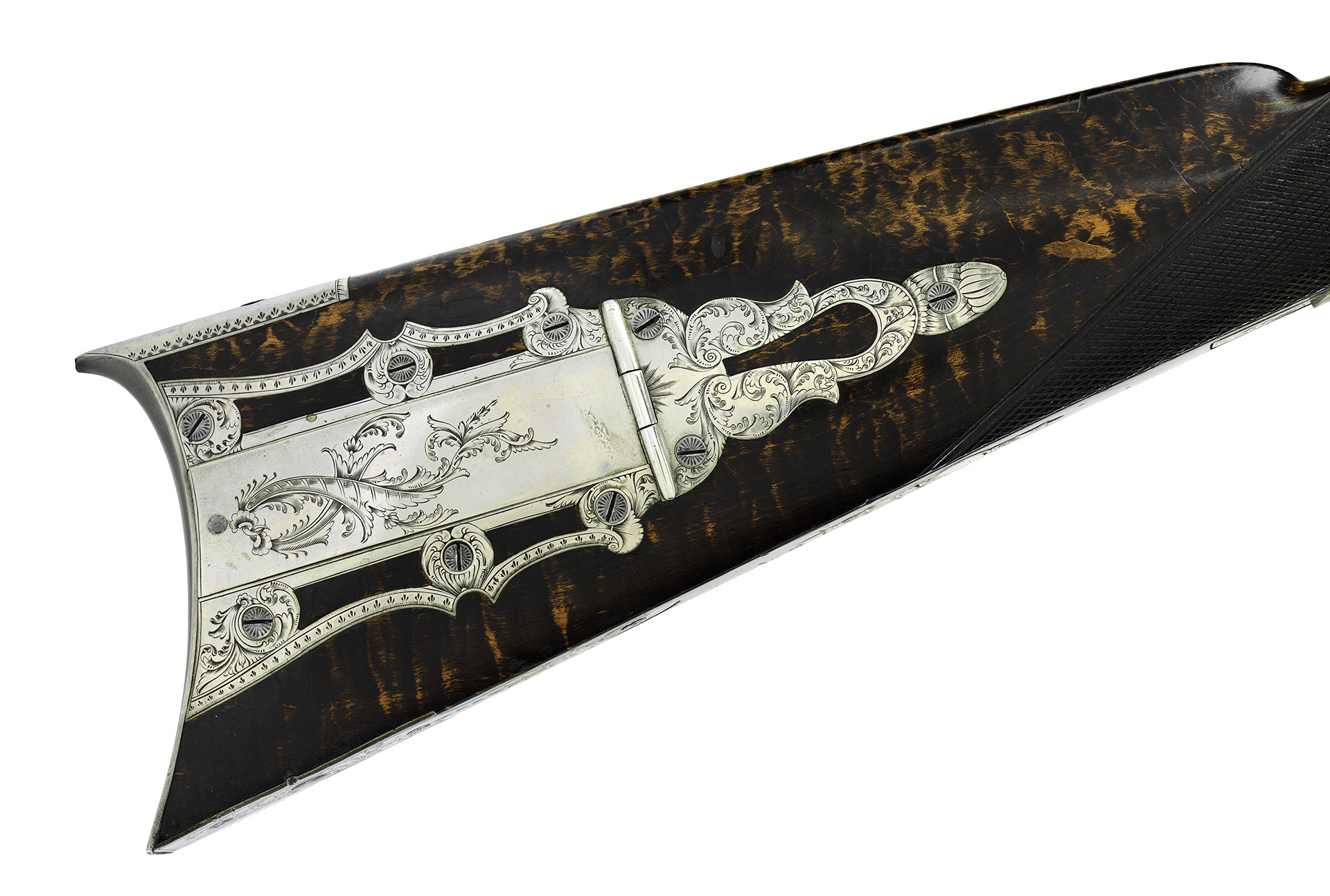
Patch box from Jonathan Cilley's rifle.

A patch box is a patch storage compartment on muzzleloader guns, usually built into the stock or butt of a rifle. Patches were used to wrap a round shot lead ball projectile so that it fit snugly in the muzzle of the gun creating the necessary seal. It also allowed undersized balls to be used. Patches were usually pre-cut and pre-lubricated, with grease, tallow, or something similar, so they were ready when needed. The patch box kept the patches handy for loading. The lubricant allowed relatively easy and rapid ramming of the ball into the muzzle, while still transferring the twist from the rifling to the projectile. The patch would generally fall away within feet of the muzzle after firing.
