= Tulle musket =

French Common Musket a.k.a. Fusil de chasse
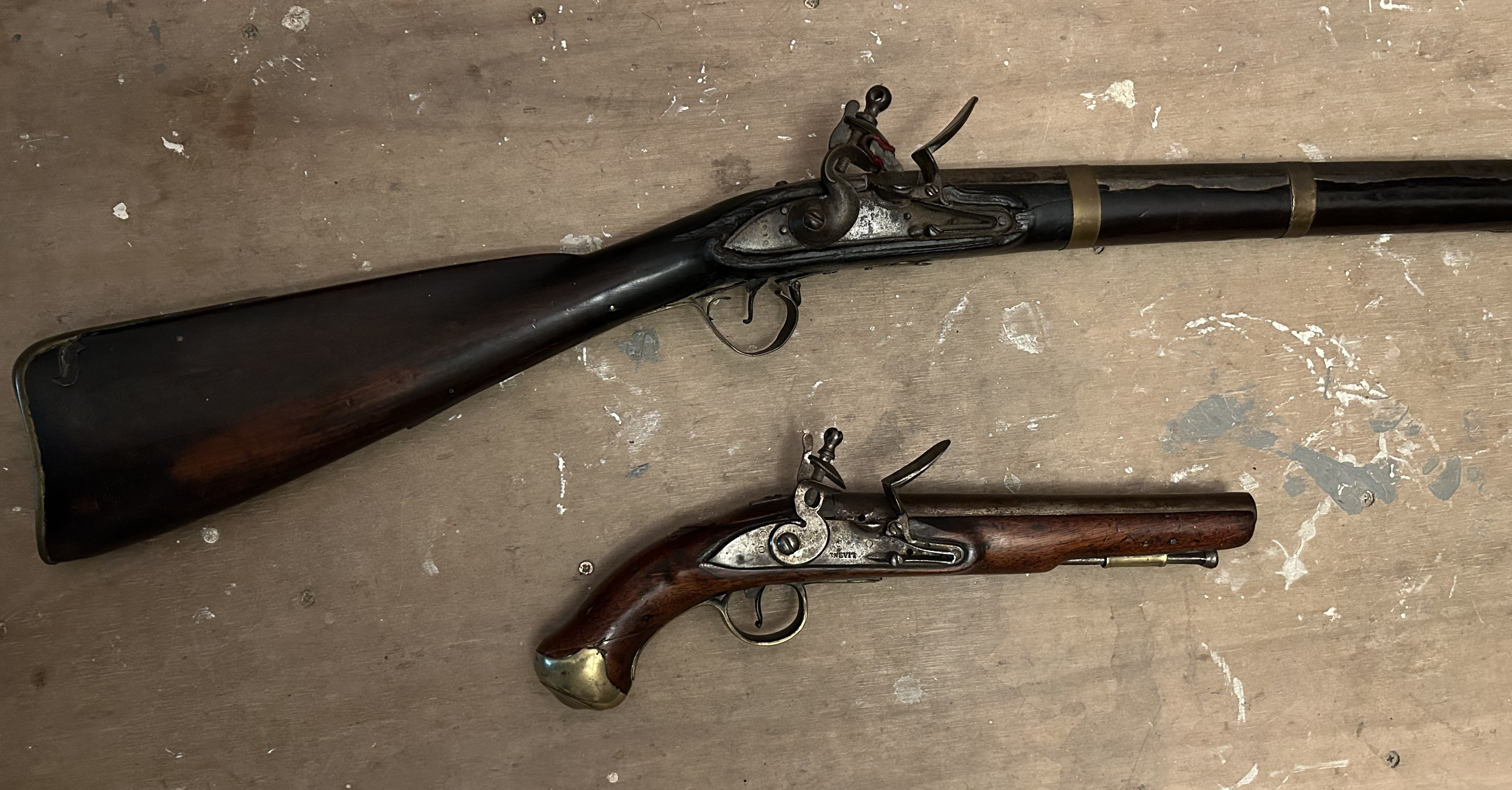
- French fusil marine ordinaire of the French and Indian Wars era. The nonstandard brass barrel bands were added by a previous owner to replace the worn-out metal wedges.
- Type: Musket
- Place of origin: Kingdom of France

Service history
- In service: 1696–1815
- Used by: French Navy, French Army, American Rebels, United States Army, Haitian Army, Native American warriors, Fur trappers, Voyageurs, Mountain men, Pirates, Jacobites
- Wars: Nine Years' War, Jacobite risings, War of the Spanish Succession, Camisard Rebellion, Fox War, War of the Quadruple Alliance, Chickasaw Wars, War of the Polish Succession, War of the Austrian Succession, Carnatic War, Seven Years' War, French and Indian War, Anglo-Dutch Wars, American War of Independence, French Revolutionary Wars, Haitian Revolution, Napoleonic Wars, War of 1812, Indian Wars

Production history
- Designer: ?
- Designed: Before 1690
- Manufacturer: Tulle armory
- Produced: 1695–1754
- Variants: Tulle Models 1695, 1715, 1717, 1729, 1734, 1746, 1754

Specifications
- Cartridge: Paper cartridge, musket ball undersized to reduce the effects of powder fouling
- Calibre: .62-inch, later.69-inch
- Barrels: Smoothbore
- Action: Flintlock; single-shot
- Rate of fire: User dependent; usually 3 to 4 rounds every one minute
- Muzzle velocity: Variable
- Effective firing range: 100 yd (91 m)
- Maximum firing range: Up to 300 yards
- Feed system: Muzzle-loaded
- Sights: Fore-sights

The French-made Tulle musket or Fusil de chasse (fu-zi dee chā-se), originally meaning "hunting gun", was a light smoothbore flintlock musket designed for hunting. A later military variant known as the Fusil marine ordinaire, or "common naval musket" was issued to the French marines during the French and Indian War and American War of Independence. French Common Muskets were typically lighter and shorter than the later Charleville muskets also manufactured at Tulle.

== Etymology ==
The name fusil is phonetically pronounced "fusee" in English." The French name Fusil is a corruption of the Italian fucile meaning flint. Also from the name fusil comes the term fusilier. A very similar but cheaper version was the fusil de traite (trade gun). Fusils were a common musket in 18th century Colonial America and were used by the Patriots during the American Revolution.

== History ==
=== Fusil de chasse ===
In France, the manufacturing of arms began as a large industry in Saint-Étienne circa 1535. The first armory was set up in 1669. By 1646, arms manufacturing had begun at Tulle nearby. In 1690 an armory was set up there as well. The flintlock was adopted by France for her armies in 1630. Both Tulle and Saint-Étienne furnished flintlocks for the French troops in America. The typical musket in 1690 was about 60 inches (1,500 mm) long and had a barrel of about 44 inches (1,100 mm).

The fusil de chasse was designed for hunting. It was an elegant flintlock with a distinctive "cow's foot" shape to the buttstock that softened recoil. This pied de vache stock shape is typical of long guns made at Tulle. Generally the muskets made at Tulle were defined by models, but some hunting fusils were made to order. Differences were based on their intended purpose and market. In 1695 and 1696 contracts for muskets from the Tulle factory each called for "five hunting muskets for the Indian Chiefs". These models would later be called a Fusil fin (chief's grade musket). These muskets were to be caliber 28 balls to the pound (approximately .56 caliber), 45 inches (1,100 mm) long, "well filed and well polished with fine mountings and a flat lock".

=== Fusil Marine Ordinaire ===
In 1696 muskets of this pattern were manufactured at Tulle for the fusiliers marins of the French navy. These had 45-inch barrels with a .69 caliber bore. The barrel was attached to the buttstock with metal pins similar to the Brown Bess instead of the metal bands used on later muskets. Early versions of this musket used a plug bayonet and wooden ramrod. Additional batches of muskets were ordered for the French marine corps in 1716, 1729 and 1734, and remained in service during the French and Indian Wars and American Revolutionary War until it was replaced with the Charleville musket. Components from French muskets of this type have been found at Fort St Joseph, Michigan.

Until about 1718 company commanders such as captains were responsible for ensuring that each soldier or marine had a working firearm, but other than that the captain allowed his soldiers to choose which musket they would use. Often, that meant there was no standard musket in use in a company let alone an army. This was a common failing of all armies of the time. That changed with the Model 1717 fusil which standardized the muskets and ammunition used by the French army. With a socket bayonet attached, it was longer than the British muskets of the time giving French troops an advantage in hand-to-hand combat. At 63 inches (1,600 mm) and with a barrel of 47 inches (1,200 mm) it allowed troops to fire from three ranks at the same time. The combination of a longer barrel and a front sight to aim the weapon also made it slightly more accurate than British muskets. A few improvements were made with the M1728 model but it was otherwise the same musket. More improvements were made in 1746 when the wooden ramrod was replaced with a metal one. The French muskets shot 18 bullets to the pound which translates to .69-caliber. The fourth and final model, which would eventually be superseded by the Charleville during the 1780s, was issued in 1754 with a shorter, lighter version for officers.

=== Tulle Fusil de Grenadier ===
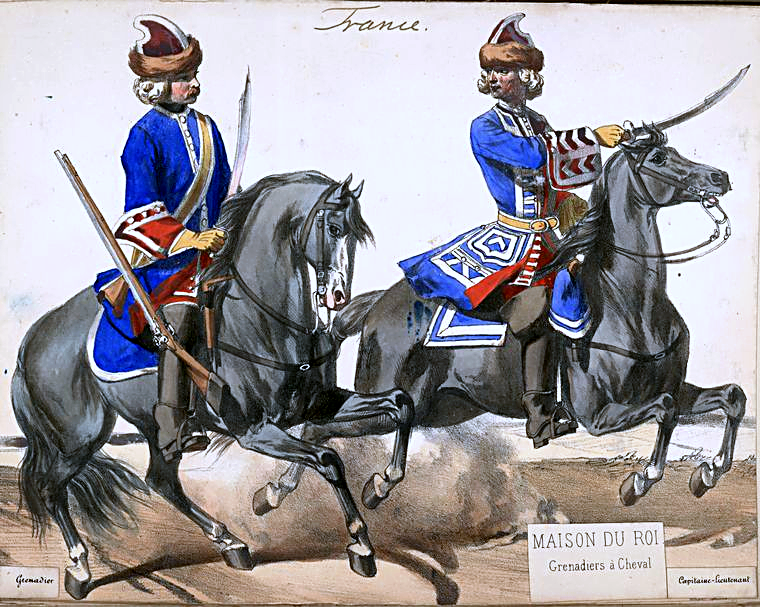
French soldier with common musket, c.1700. Unlike the Charleville, these did not have barrel bands.

From 1729 to 1734, the French army adopted the Tulle musket to arm their elite grenadiers. These were issued until the end of the French and Indian Wars, due to the scarcity of the new Charleville musket introduced in 1728. Both army and navy muskets from Tulle have been discovered in 18th century French shipwrecks such as the frigate Machault, sunk off the coast of Canada during the Battle of Restigouche in 1760.

Both the French and the British had versions of the officer's fusil, which were generally of higher quality than those issued to enlisted troops. The British fusils were based on the Brown Bess musket. The French officer's fusil was fitted for a sling and the stock was 4 inches (100 mm) shorter than the barrel to fit a socket bayonet. At 20 gauge (.62-caliber) the fusil was also used as a fowling gun (early predecessor of the shotgun). The officers' model weighed about 7 pounds (3.2 kg) and was 54 inches (1,400 mm) in length. All officers, including generals, carried an officer's model fusil.

=== Fusil de traite ===
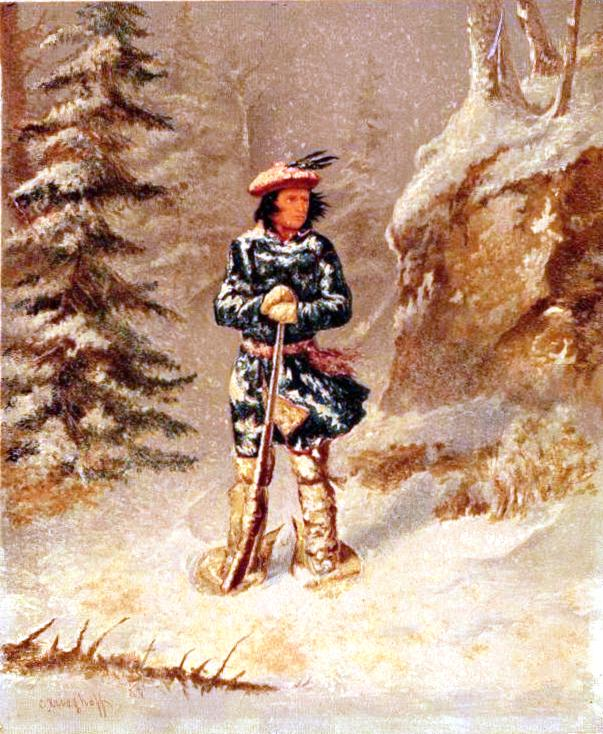
Painting of an Iroquois Indian hunter with French trade gun.

In New France, the Indians allied to the French carried French fusils. These were either Fusils de chasse or de traite. Higher quality muskets, sometimes with custom engraving, were gifted to Indian chiefs who often decorated these prized weapons with brass tacks. Flintlock English and French trade guns of this type were used by the Indians as recently as the mid-19th century. At the Battle of the Monongahela, British General Edward Braddock led his troops directly into an ambush by native American and French troops in July 1755. Braddock was killed, no doubt, by a .62 caliber ball fired from a French fusil. The smoothbore Tulle musket was carried by most, if not all, the Indians who attacked Braddock at the Monongahela River.

Native warriors took very good care of their muskets and strongly preferred the French fusils over guns made elsewhere. Although the fusil de traite was designed as a less-expensive trade gun, many Indians knew the difference and preferred the fusil de chasse. While there were a number of different models of fusils sent to the Americas, the light musket de chasse was designed for those who hunted for a living. So many were needed that the factory at Saint-Étienne had to handle the extra demand. Most of these were shipped to New France where trading was the main activity between Native Americans and the French. Both varieties were made with either iron or brass fittings and most were .62 caliber. Both were marked "Tulle" (earlier spelling was "Tvlle") on the lock plate. This makes archaeological finds harder to tell apart over two centuries later. Many of the reproductions made today are marked "Tulle".

=== Cost ===
The various flintlocks produced at Tulle had the following costs in 1750:

- Fusil de Chasse (ordinary) – 15 to 20 livre. In 1997 US dollars, that would be between $30 and $40.
- Fusil de fin (chief's grade) – 25 to 40 livre. In 1997 dollars, $50 to $80.
- Fusil de traite (ordinary) – 9 to 15 livre. About $18 to $30 in 1997.
- Fusil de militarie (grenidier or ordinary) – 20 to 30 livre. About $40 to US$60 in 1997.

== See also ==
- Charleville Musket
- Brown Bess
- Potzdam Musket
- Springfield Musket
- Kentucky Rifle

== Other websites ==
- Flintlock Smoothbore Performance – Fusil de Chasse on YouTube
- Shooting the Fusil de Chasse 62 caliber/ 20 gauge Smoothbore Musket on YouTube
