= Spandau (disambiguation) =

Spandau may refer to:

== Places ==
- Spandau, a district of Berlin, Germany
  - Spandau (locality), a locality of Berlin in the Spandau district
  - Berlin-Spandau – Charlottenburg North, an electoral district
- Spandau Prison
- Spandau Citadel, a renaissance fortress in Berlin
- Spandau arsenal, developing infantry weapons for Imperial Germany from 1850 to 1919
- Berlin-Spandau station, a railway station in Berlin

== Weapons ==
- Maschinengewehr 08, also known as Spandau, a standard World War I German Army machine gun
- MG 34, a World War II German machine gun as referred to by the British
- MG 42, a World War II German machine gun as referred to by the British

== Other meanings ==
- Spandau Ballet, a British 1980s pop group
- Rudolf Hess, a Nazi war criminal often known as "the (last) Prisoner of Spandau"
