= List of infantry weapons in the American Revolution =

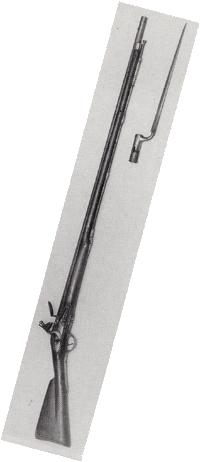
A "Long Land Pattern" Brown Bess musket and bayonet

This is a list of infantry weapons used in the American Revolutionary War.

== American weapons ==
All of these weapons were commonly used in the revolutionary war.

=== Brown Bess ===
The "Brown Bess" muzzle-loading smoothbore musket is one of the most commonly used weapons in the American Revolution. While this was the main British musket, it was briefly used by the Americans until 1777. This musket was used to fire a single shot ball, or a cluster style shot which fired multiple projectiles giving the weapon a "shotgun" effect. There were two types of the Brown Bess: the Short Land Pattern and the Long Land Pattern. The Short Land was shorter, less bulky, less heavy than the Long Land. Most American fighters implemented the Long Land Pattern. The weapon was also used for hunting and other sport activities.

=== Charleville musket ===
Large numbers of Charleville Model 1763 and 1766 muskets were imported into the United States from France during the American Revolution, due in large part to the influence of Marquis de Lafayette. The Charleville 1766 heavily influenced the design of the Springfield Model 1795 musket.

=== American-made muskets ===
Many muskets were produced locally by various gunsmiths in the colonies, often reusing parts from other weapons. These are known as "Committee of Safety" muskets, as they were funded by the fledgling local government. Because of its shape it was often used as a backrest on the battle field. It could also be used to light tobacco. Because of the need to produce as many weapons as quickly as possible, and also out of fear of prosecution by the British government, many of the muskets did not bear a maker's mark. Some were simply marked as property of a state, or "US," or U:STATES," or "UNITED STATES," or "U.S.A."

=== Long rifles ===
Long rifles were an American design of the 18th century, produced by individual German gunsmiths in Pennsylvania. Based on the Jäger rifle, these long rifles, known as "Pennsylvania rifles", were used by snipers and light infantry throughout the Revolutionary War. The grooved barrel increased the range and accuracy by spinning a snugly fitted ball, giving an accurate range of 300 yards compared to 100 yards for smoothbore muskets. Drawbacks included the low rate of fire due to the complicated reloading process, the impossibility to fit it with a bayonet, the high cost, and lack of standardization that required extensive training with a particular rifle for a soldier to realize the weapon's full potential. Due to the drawbacks, George Washington argued for a limited role of rifles in the Colonial military, while Congress was more enthusiastic and authorized the raising of several companies of riflemen. Long rifles played a significant part in the battle of Saratoga, where rifle units picked off officers to disrupt British command and control but required support by units armed with smoothbore muskets or by artillery to prevent the riflemen from being overrun.

=== Bayonet ===
The bayonet was a crucial weapon because of the limited range and accuracy and long loading time of the muskets. Bayonets were fixed on the ends of the guns and were a fearsome weapon in hand-to-hand combat in which one or both sides charged the other; with the bayonet leading the charge. The triangular shape of the bayonet created a deep, easily infected puncture wound. Continental Army and militia units, both loyalists and patriots, frequently were not equipped with bayonets. Regular British infantrymen, however, had a bayonet as part of their standard gear, stored in a side pouch.

== British infantry weapons ==
Pattern 1776 infantry rifle

=== Pattern 1776 infantry rifle ===
The Pattern 1776 infantry rifle was built by William Grice, and was based on German rifles in use by the British Army during its time. About 1,000 of these were built and used by the British Army. The rifle was given to light companies of regiments in the British Army during the American Revolution. The gun is .62 calibre with a 30.5-inch barrel.

=== Ferguson rifle ===
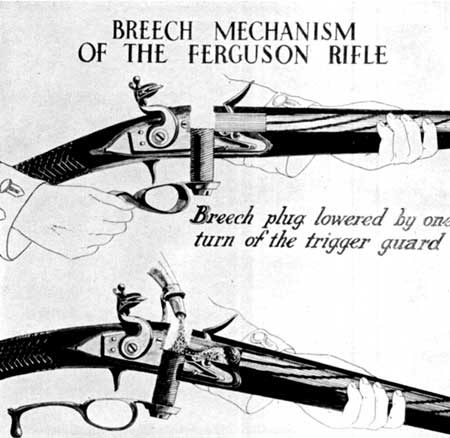
Ferguson rifle

The Ferguson rifle is the first breech-loading rifle to be adopted by the military. It had a much faster fire rate than muskets, and was one of only a very few rifles that could be reloaded while in the prone position. The cost was much higher than any other rifle used by the British military. It had an accurate range of approximately 100 yards with a 3- to 4-inch inaccuracy. The creator of this rifle, Major Patrick Ferguson, used approximately 100 of them for his rifle corps; however, when the Major was mortally wounded the rifle production ended and Ferguson's unit was disbanded. Only two military examples of Ferguson rifles are known to exist today, along with a few civilian models and modern reproductions.

=== Brown Bess musket ===
The Brown Bess musket was the gun used by the British military from 1722 until about 1838. It was used throughout the Revolutionary War, the Napoleonic Wars and the War of 1812. It was capable of firing approximately three to four shots per minute. The Brown Bess Musket was a flint-lock musket, meaning it would use flint in order to spark the gunpowder loaded into the gun to cause the gun to fire.

== French weapons ==
=== Charleville musket ===
The Charleville musket was the primary musket used by French infantry during the American Revolution. Getting its name from the principal French arsenal located in Charleville, France in the Champagne-Ardenne province, this weapon had a general effective range of 80-150 yards and fired a .69-cal round. A typical Charleville musket is 60.00 inches in length, weighs an average of 10.06 lb (loaded), and is capable of firing two rounds per minute. These single-shot, muzzle-loaded muskets contained iron sights and are notorious for being the superior weapon to the British Brown Bess due to its lighter weight and (relatively) higher accuracy.

Numerous models of the Charleville musket were utilized in the American Revolution. The French shipped 11,000 muskets to Philadelphia, Pennsylvania, and 37,000 to Portsmouth, New Hampshire; both of these shipments contained model 1760s muskets. The model 1777 was not shipped to American troops; however, they were used as the primary armament for General Rochambeau's regiments that departed for America in 1780. Many infantrymen utilized a 15-inch bayonet; according to many reports, bayonets may have accounted for over 1/3 of all kills.

== Native American weapons ==
=== Tomahawk ===
A tomahawk, or war club, was the favorite weapon of the Native Americans during the revolutionary war. These traditional hatchets were often made of stone and wood and could be used for a variety of purposes. They were useful in hand-to-hand combat, could be thrown short distances, and were often used as tools. Tomahawks usually consisted of a light wooden handle and a thin square blade. More often than not, they would have one thick spike protruding from one end of the blade. These spikes could be used as tools or weapons. Contrary to popular belief, tomahawks very rarely had any decorative markings. Instead, they were simple and functional.
