= Model 1752 musket =

Muzzle loaded firearm used by the Spanish Army 1752-1850s

M1752 musket
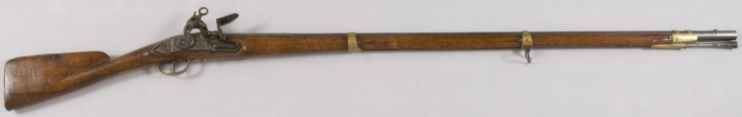
- Type: Musket
- Place of origin: Kingdom of Spain

Service history
- In service: Spanish army 1752–1850s Bruneian army
- Used by: Spanish Empire, various indigenous peoples of the Americas, United States of America, Haiti, Mexico, Bruneian Empire
- Wars: Indian Wars, Seven Years' War, Anglo-Spanish War, Invasion of Portugal, Twenty Years' War, American Revolutionary war, Spanish-Portuguese War, Haitian Revolution, French Revolutionary Wars, War of the Pyrenees, Anglo-Spanish War, War of the Oranges, Saint-Domingue expedition, Napoleonic Wars, Peninsular War, Bolivian War of Independence, Venezuelan War of Independence, Argentine War of Independence, Mexican War of Independence, Chilean War of Independence, Spanish reconquest of New Granada, Ecuadorian War of Independence, Spanish reconquest attempts in Mexico, French invasion of Spain, Portuguese Civil War, First Carlist War, Mexican–American War, Second Carlist War, Cochinchina Campaign, Hispano-Moroccan War, Dominican Restoration War, Chincha Islands War, Ten Years' War

Production history
- Designed: 1752
- Manufacturer: State Arsenals—Spain
- Produced: 1752–19th century
- Variants: Model 1752, Model 1755, Model 1757

Specifications
- Mass: 10.80 lb (4.90 kg)
- Length: 57.09 in (1,450 mm)
- Barrel length: 43.31 in (1,100 mm)
- Cartridge: Paper cartridge, musket ball undersized to reduce the effects of powder fouling
- Calibre: .69 (17.526 mm)
- Action: Flintlock/percussion lock (conversion)
- Rate of fire: User dependent; usually 2 to 3 rounds every one minute
- Effective firing range: Around 47 yards
- Feed system: Muzzle-loaded
- Sights: A front sight cast into the upper barrel band

The Model 1752 musket (Spanish: Modelo 1752) was a muzzle-loading firearm invented in 1752 and used by the Spanish Army from then until it was widely replaced by the much more effective Minié rifles during the mid-19th century. It was the first standardized long gun utilized by the Spanish military and was deployed in Spain's American colonies, where it saw action during the Battle of Havana. Spain also provided around 10,000 up to 12,000 muskets to the American rebels during the Revolutionary War.

Proving typically conventional for the period, the weapon maintained a long service life under the Spanish crown and was deployed to its various frontline forces across the various Spanish holdings. The Model 1752 was in widespread circulation up until the middle of the 1850s by which time more and more fighting forces were adopting more modern Minié ball-long guns (categorized as "rifled muskets").

The Model 1752 saw some later modifications in 1755 and 1757.

The Model 1752 Musket featured design qualities associated with this period of land-based warfare (in general line infantry)—these were long, heavy guns made primarily with a single-piece wooden stock housing the steel barrel and works of the gun lock. As muzzle-loading weapons, they were loaded down the muzzle end of the gun which necessitated use of a ramrod held in a channel in the stock under the barrel. The stock was affixed to the barrel at multiple points, usually two brass barrel bands and a nose cap at front and which had a ramrod pipe cast to it. The firing mechanism was of the flintlock method requiring a piece of flint to be seated in a vice and cocked rearwards prior to firing. Additional steps included the loading of black powder both into the pan and down the barrel, prior to inserting the rest of the ammunition consisting of both a musket ball and paper cartridge which also doubled as wadding. The wooden stock incorporated a slightly angled grip that extended downwards to become the shoulder support (or shoulder stock), capped with a metal butt plate. Fixtures along the top of the barrel allowed the gun to be aimed. The trigger was set within an oblong ring (trigger guard) under the action as normal. While the rest of the musket outwardly resembled other muskets of the 18th Century, the lock was unique, being of the characteristic Spanish "Miquelet" type. This action reworked some of the accepted design practices of the flintlock—mainly at the mainspring and hammer (or cock). Eventually, many were converted from flintlock to percussion cap in the mid-19th century.

== Variants ==
=== Model 1752 ===
Original series model; pattern of 1752.

=== Model 1755 ===
Modified pattern of 1752 .

=== Model 1757 ===
Modified pattern of 1752.

== See also ==
- Military history of Spain
- List of wars involving Spain
- Charleville musket
- Brown Bess
- Potzdam Musket 1723

== Literature ==
- Chartrand, René; Hook, Richard (2013). Spanish Guerrillas in the Peninsular War 1808–14. Men-at-arms (1st ed.). Oxford: Osprey. p. 30. ISBN 9781472803016.
- Chartrand, René; Rickman, David (2011). The Spanish Army in North America 1700 - 1793 (PDF). Men-at-arms. Oxford: Osprey. pp. 40–41. ISBN 978-1-84908-597-7.
- Moller, George D., ed. (2011). American military shoulder arms. Volume 1. Colonial and Revolutionary War arms. Albuquerque: University of New Mexico Press. pp. 405–412. ISBN 978-0-8263-4995-8.
- Reid, Stuart (2016). The Flintlock Musket: Brown Bess and Charleville 1715–1865. Oxford: Osprey Publishing Ltd. p. 17. ISBN 978-1-4728-1095-3.
