= Musket Model 1777 =

Musket Modèle 1777
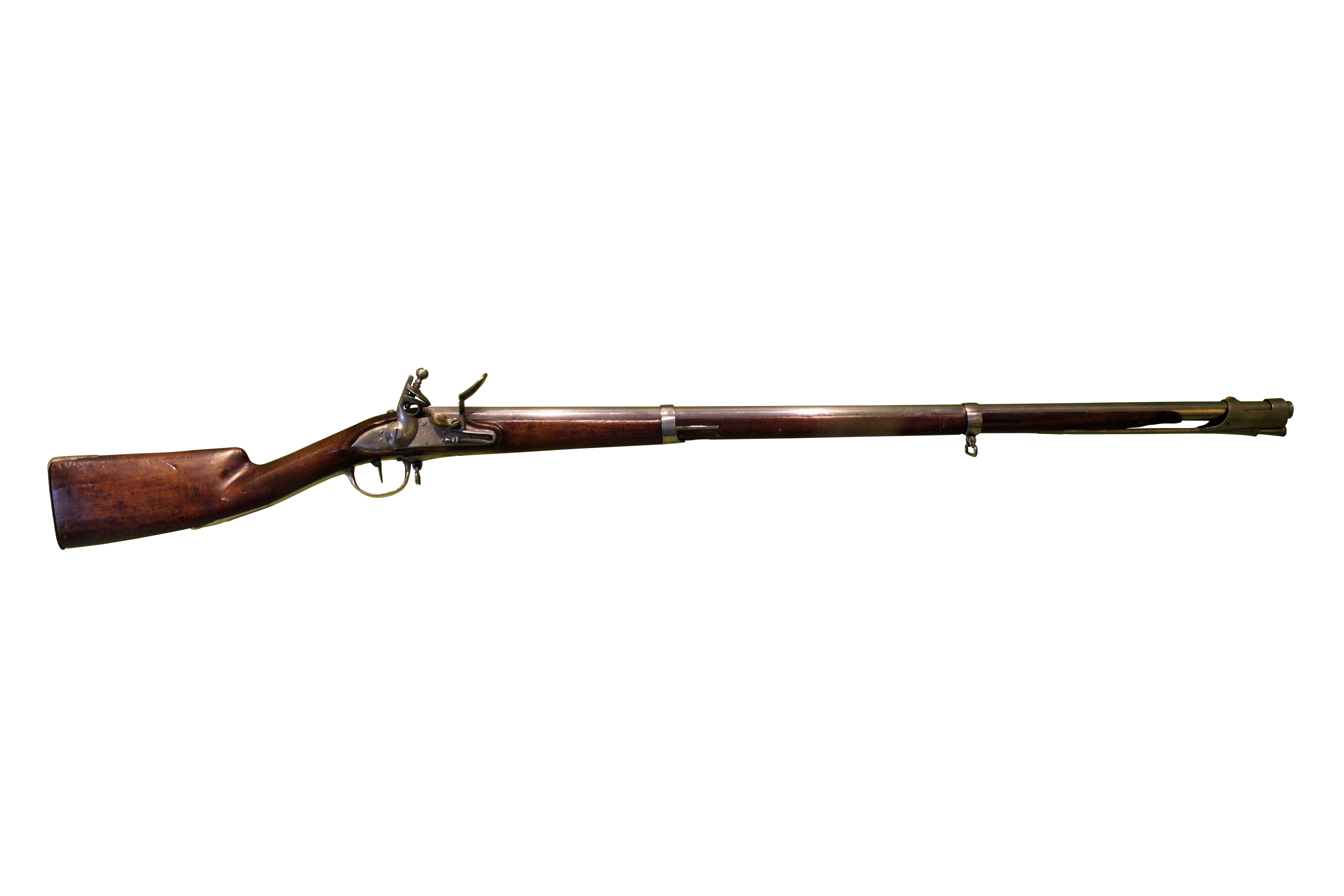
- Type: Musket
- Place of origin: France

Service history
- In service: French Army 1777–1840
- Used by: France, various native American tribes, United States of America, Haiti, Kingdom of Ireland, First French Empire, Confederation of the Rhine, First Hellenic Republic, Confederate States of America, Pirates, Privateers, Metis, Hunters, Voyageurs, Canada, Greece,
- Wars: American War of Independence, Haitian Revolution, French Revolutionary Wars, Coalition Wars, United Irishmen Rebellion, Napoleonic Wars, Emmet's Insurrection, Siege of Santo Domingo of 1805, War of 1812, Greek War of Independence, Franco-Trarzan War of 1825, French conquest of Algeria, First Franco-Mexican War, Franco-Moroccan War, French–Tahitian War, American Civil War

Production history
- Designed: 1777
- Manufacturer: Charleville armoury and others
- Produced: 1777–1839 (all variants)
- No. built: 7,000,000
- Variants: Modèle 1777 corrigé en l'an IX

Specifications
- Mass: 4.75 kilograms (10.5 lb)
- Length: 1.52 metres (60 in)
- Barrel length: 113.7 centimetres (44.8 in)
- Cartridge: 16.54 mm, 27.19 g lead ball 12.24 black-powder propellant
- Caliber: 17.5mm (.69 inch) musket ball
- Action: Flintlock/percussion lock (conversion)
- Rate of fire: User dependent; usually 2 to 3 rounds a minute
- Muzzle velocity: Variable 420 m/s (1,400 ft/s)
- Effective firing range: Variable (50–100 yards)
- Feed system: Muzzle-loaded
- Sights: A front sight cast into the upper barrel band

The musket Modèle 1777, and later Modèle 1777 corrigé en l'an IX (Model 1777 corrected in the year IX, or 1800 in the French Revolutionary Calendar) was one of the most widespread weapons on the European continent.

It was part of a weapon family with numerous variants, e.g. for the light infantry, artillery and a musketoon for the cavalry.

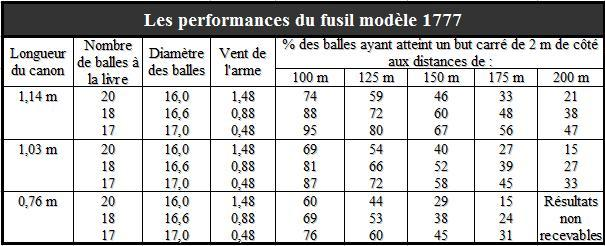
Table based on the memoirs of Captain Rayne (Metz, 1818).

== Modèle 1777 corrigé en l'an IX ==
After the French Revolutionary Wars, first consul Napoleon Bonaparte commissioned a rework; some minor modifications on the lock, bayonet and stock resulted in 1800 in the "corrected" model, also called "Modèle 1777 corrigé".

== Other improvements ==
The Musket was further improved in 1816 and 1822. Many were converted from flintlock to percussion cap in the mid-19th century.

== Impact ==
7 million muskets were produced, including variants 1800 (an IX), 1816 and 1822, but not including muskets like the Austrian 1798 or the Prussian 1809, which were heavily influenced by the French 1777. Until World War I, no other firearm was produced in such large numbers.

Properly trained French infantry were expected to be able to fire three volleys a minute with the 1777. A trained infantryman could hit a man sized target at 80 yards but anything further required an increasing amount of luck and the musket became wildly inaccurate at long range. Compared to the British Brown Bess, it fired musket balls that fitted more tightly into the barrel resulting in a better accuracy but a lower rate of fire and more fouling issues.

The Grande Armée marched into the German countries and left approx. 750,000 muskets retreating in 1815; until about 1840, French weapons were used in Germany.

Details of the musket
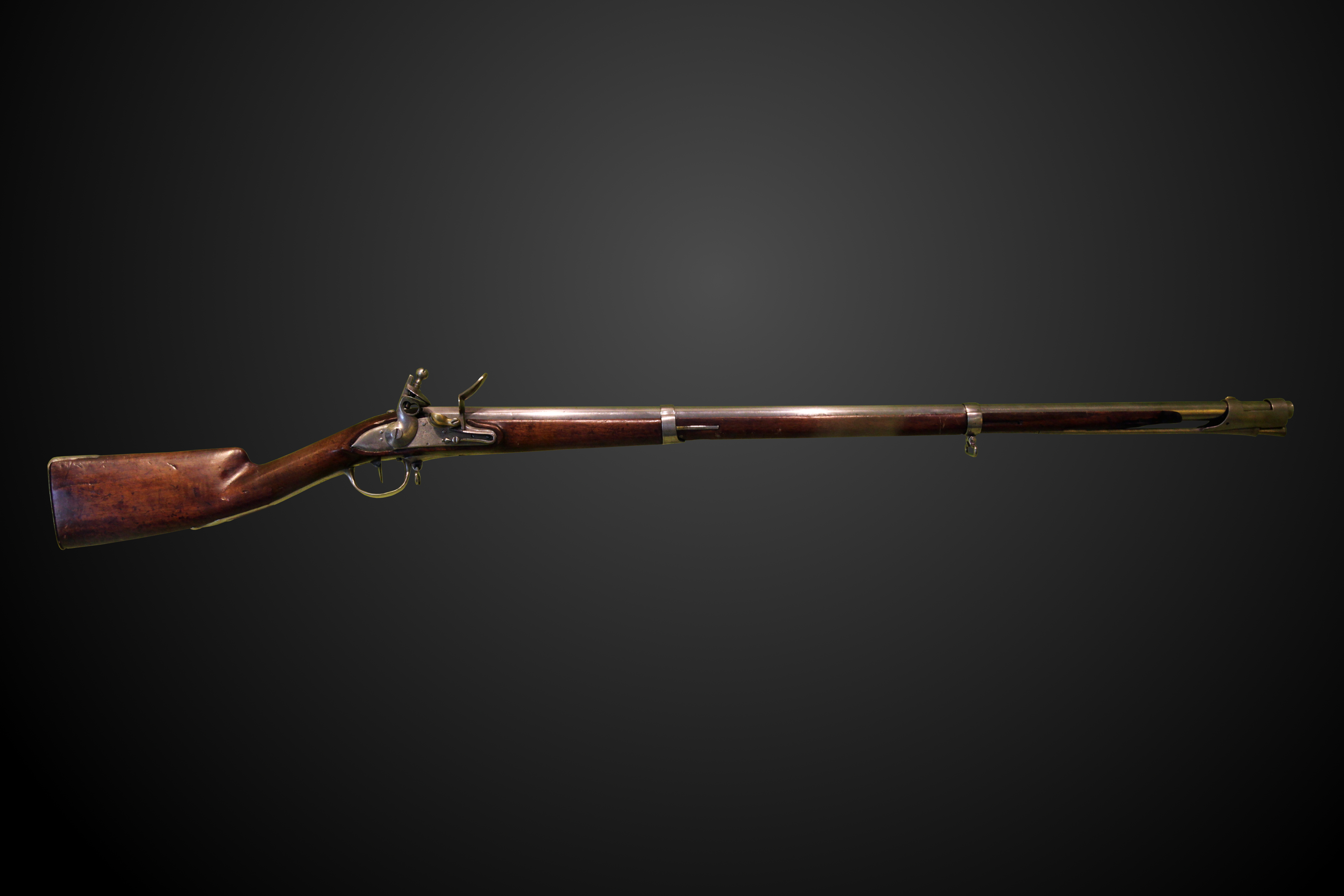
Musket Modèle 1777 made during the Revolution

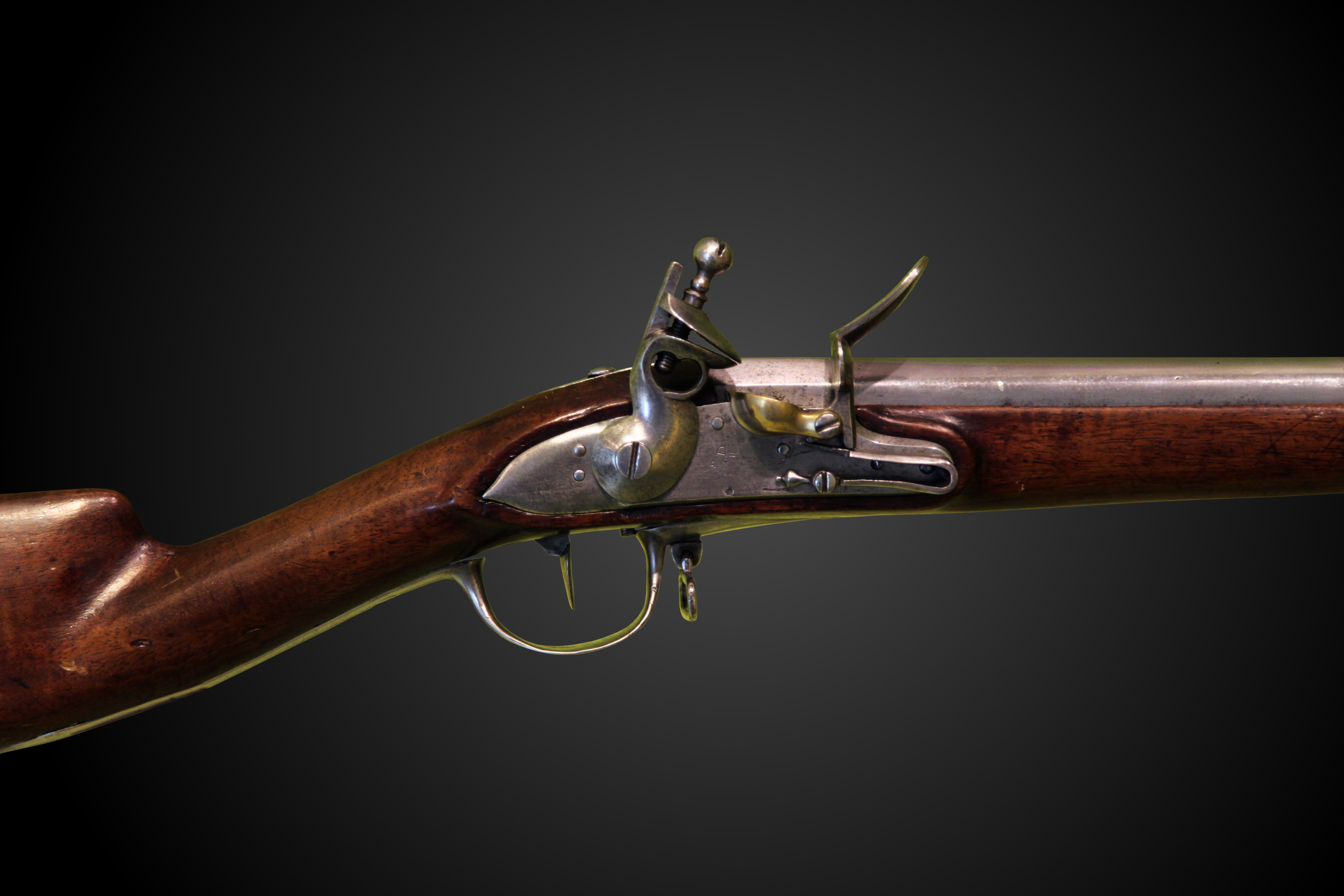
The flintlock mechanism

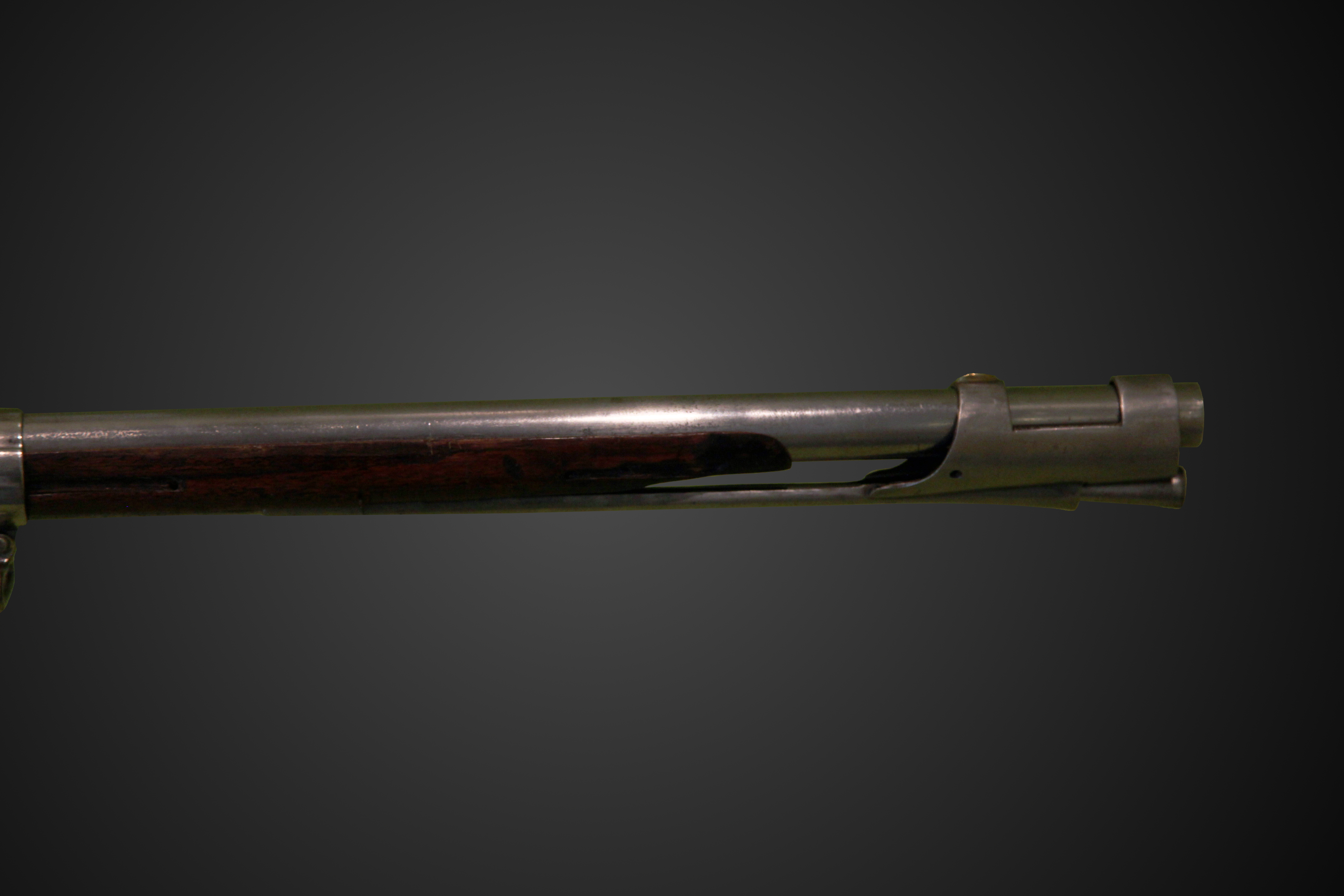
The muzzle

== See also ==
- Charleville musket for predecessors of the Modèle 1777
- Brown Bess – English musket, "counterpart" to the 1777 in the Napoleonic Wars

== Literature ==
- Götz, Hans-Dieter (1996). Militärgewehre und Pistolen der deutschen Staaten 1800–1870 (in German) (2nd ed.). Stuttgart: Motorbuch-Verlag. ISBN 3-87943-533-2.

| Preceded by Charleville musket | French Army rifle 1777–1826 | Succeeded by Delvigne rifle 1826 |
