= Potzdam Musket =

Type of musket

Prussian Land Pattern Musket Potzdam musket
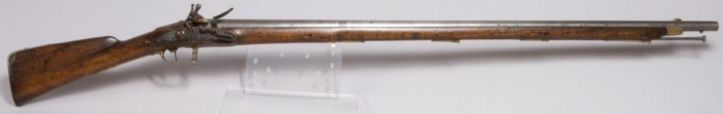
- 1740 pattern
- Type: long-gun
- Place of origin: Kingdom of Prussia

Service history
- In service: Royal Prussian Army (1723–1839)
- Used by: Prussia; Holy Roman Empire; British Empire; United States of America; Confederate States of America
- Wars: War of the Polish Succession; War of the Austrian Succession; First Silesian War; Second Silesian War; Third Silesian War (part of the Seven Years' War theatre); First Partition of Poland; American War of Independence; War of the Bavarian Succession; French Revolutionary Wars; Coalition Wars; Napoleonic Wars; American Civil War

Production history
- Designed: 1723
- Manufacturer: Potzdam Royal Arsenal; Spandau Royal Arsenal
- Produced: 1723–1839
- Variants: Infantry Musket Model 1723; M1723/M1740; M1809; M1809/31; M1831; Cavalry; Carbine

Specifications
- Mass: 9.74 lb (4.42 kg) to 10.75 lb (4.88 kg)
- Length: 50.61 in (1,285 mm) to 61.61 in (1,565 mm)
- Barrel length: 34.82 in (884 mm) to 45.82 in (1,164 mm)
- Cartridge: paper cartridge, solid shot/buck and ball (musket ball undersized to reduce the effects of powder fouling)
- Calibre: .71 (18.03mm) to.78 (20mm)
- Barrels: 1 (smoothbore)
- Action: flintlock percussion lock (conversion)
- Rate of fire: user-dependent; usually 2 to 3 rounds/minute
- Muzzle velocity: variable
- Effective firing range: 100 to 200 yd (91 to 183 m)
- Maximum firing range: 300 yd (274 m)
- Feed system: muzzle-loaded
- Sights: fore-sights fore-sights and V-notch

The Potzdam musket was the standard infantry weapon of the Royal Prussian Army (German: Königlich Preußische Armee) from the 18th century until the military reforms of the 1840s. Four models were produced—in 1723, 1740, 1809 and 1831.

== History ==
Potzdam, just outside Berlin, had been Frederick the Great of Prussia's favorite place of residence as well as the city where the musket was made, hence the name. While the musket is more correctly called a Prussian infantry musket or a Prussian pattern musket, these muskets later became known as „Potzdam muskets".

After Frederick was crowned in 1740, he ordered the then-current Prussian musket; a version from 1723, for his army. The Potzdam musket had already made a name for itself by being the first standard German-made long-gun, and the 1740 model further solidified Potzdam as the key arsenal for Germany. The muskets were widely used by the Prussians and soldiers of the various German principalities in the 18th century. British-hired Hessian troops as well as troops from other German principalities in the revolting thirteen British colonies in America also used the muskets against rebels.

== Design features ==
A smoothbore musket, the weapon was reasonably accurate to about 100 yards (91 m) against line infantry. But a musket was preferably used at a much shorter distance than that when discharged en masse.

The calibre of the Potzdam Muskets was between 0.71 (18.034 mm) and 0.7874 inches (20.00 mm)—which was larger than most other major nations' military rounds.

The barrel length of the Potzdam muskets varied between 884 millimetres (34.8 in) and 116 centimetres (46 in) and an overall length between 1,420 millimetres (56 in) and 1,565 millimetres (61.6 in), and weighed between 4.42 kilograms (9.7 lb) and 4.88 kilograms (10.8 lb). The stock of the Potzdam was usually made of walnut. Stress-bearing parts of the Potzdam, such as the barrel, lock plate and firing mechanism were made of steel and sling-swivels made of iron whilst other furniture pieces such as the butt plate, trigger guard and ramrod pipe were found in brass.

Many were converted from flintlock to percussion cap in the mid-19th century.

== Variants ==
=== Model 1723 ===
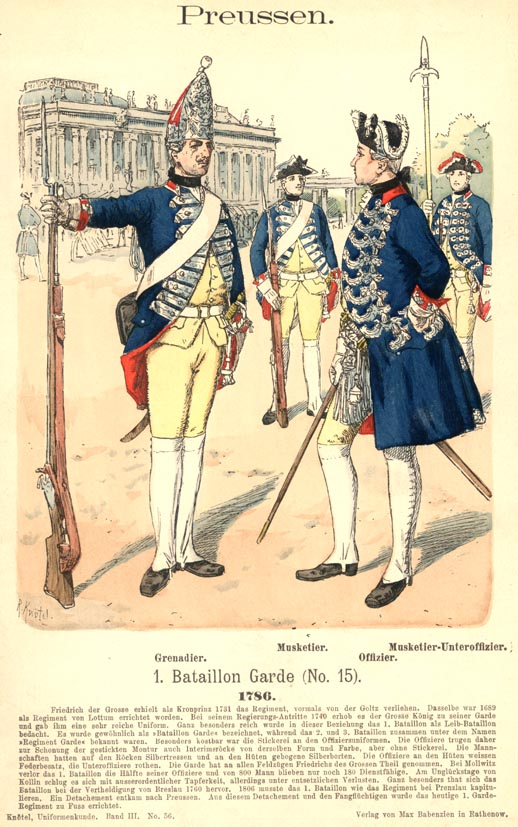
A Prussian grenadier with a 1723 pattern musket at Potzdam City Palace in 1786

The Potzdam Infantry Musket Model 1723 was the first standard long-gun of the Prussian Army. It was the rival of the Charleville musket (1717) of France and the Brown Bess-musket (1722) of Great Britain. These were manufactured in .73 calibre—to enable the use of British military bullets. It had pins to hold the barrel in place and four pipes which held a steel scouring stick with a trumpet shaped end. As with the Royal Swedish Army, that also clung to pinned barrels (until pattern 1775), the Potzdam musket had fore-sights made of brass, making the bayonet lug's optimal location under the barrel where an 18.50-inch (470 mm) triangular cross-section bayonet could be fitted—its inner diameter was approximately 0.8543307 inches (21.70000 mm). Moreover, could the weapon's rounded fore-sights be used with a crude rear sight in form of an oblong rounded notch in the barrel peg.

The Potzdam Infantry Model 1723 for the Guard (German: Infanteriegewehr Modell 1723 für die Garde) had a calibre of around 0.78 in (20 mm). The barrel length was 45.82 in (1,164 mm) and an overall length of 61.61 in (1,565 mm), and weighed 10.75 pounds (4.88 kg).

=== Model 1723/Model 1740 ===
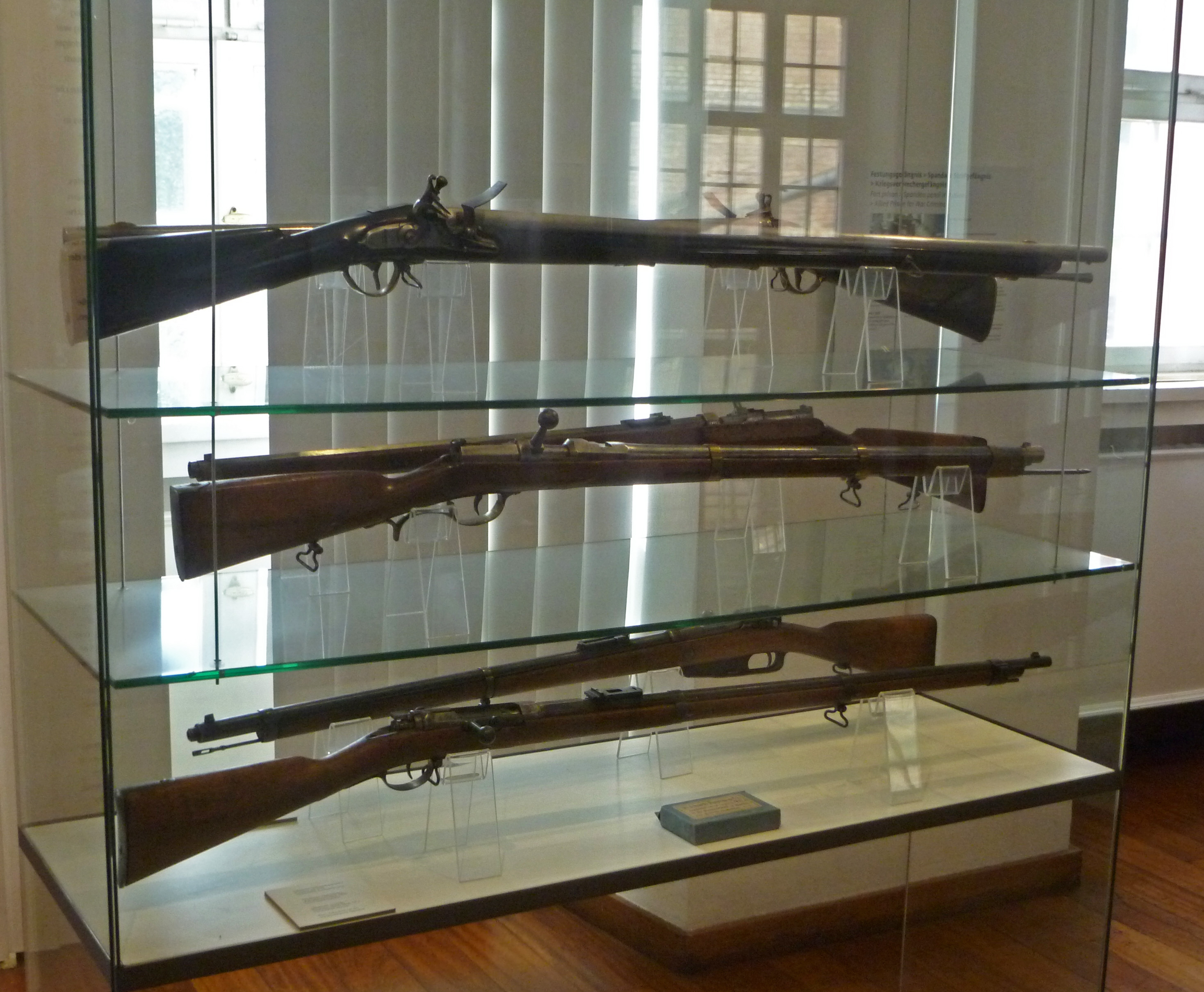
1740 pattern musket (top), needle gun and Franco-Prussian War era Mauser rifle made at Spandau Royal Arsenal

The 1740 pattern Potzdam Musket, derived from the earlier 1723 pattern, was produced from 1740 to 1760 and used the same standardised parts. The mounts were brass, and the barrel was shortened by 11 inches (280 mm). It was supplied to allied German states during- and after the Seven Years' War, and was also manufactured at Herzberg, Wesel, Schmalkalden and Suhl.

The 1740 model had a 41-inch (1,000 mm) barrel and an overall length of 50.61417 inches (1,285.600 mm), and weighed less than 9 pounds (4.1 kg).

Though the M1723/M1740 eventually gave way for the Potzdam Infantry Musket Model 1809, it was still in use by Prussian soldiers at the Battle of Waterloo in 1815 and beyond.

=== Model 1809 ===
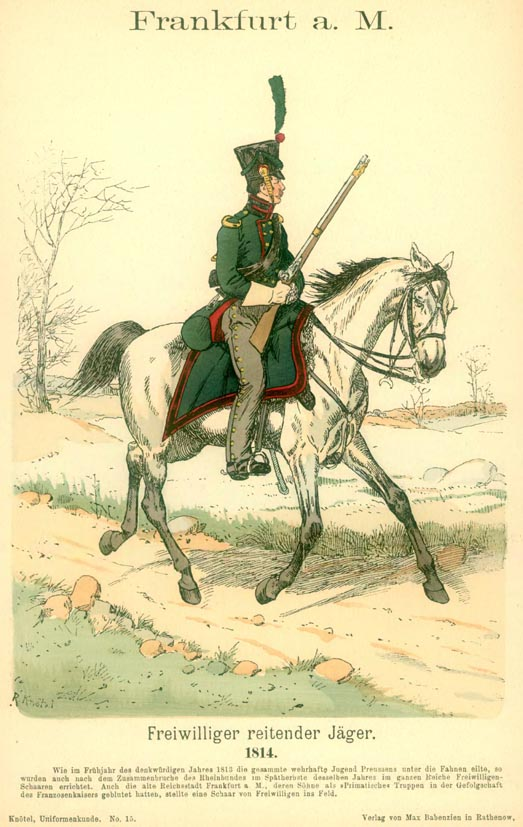
Carbine variant of the 1809 Potzdam musket issued to Hessian dragoons in 1814

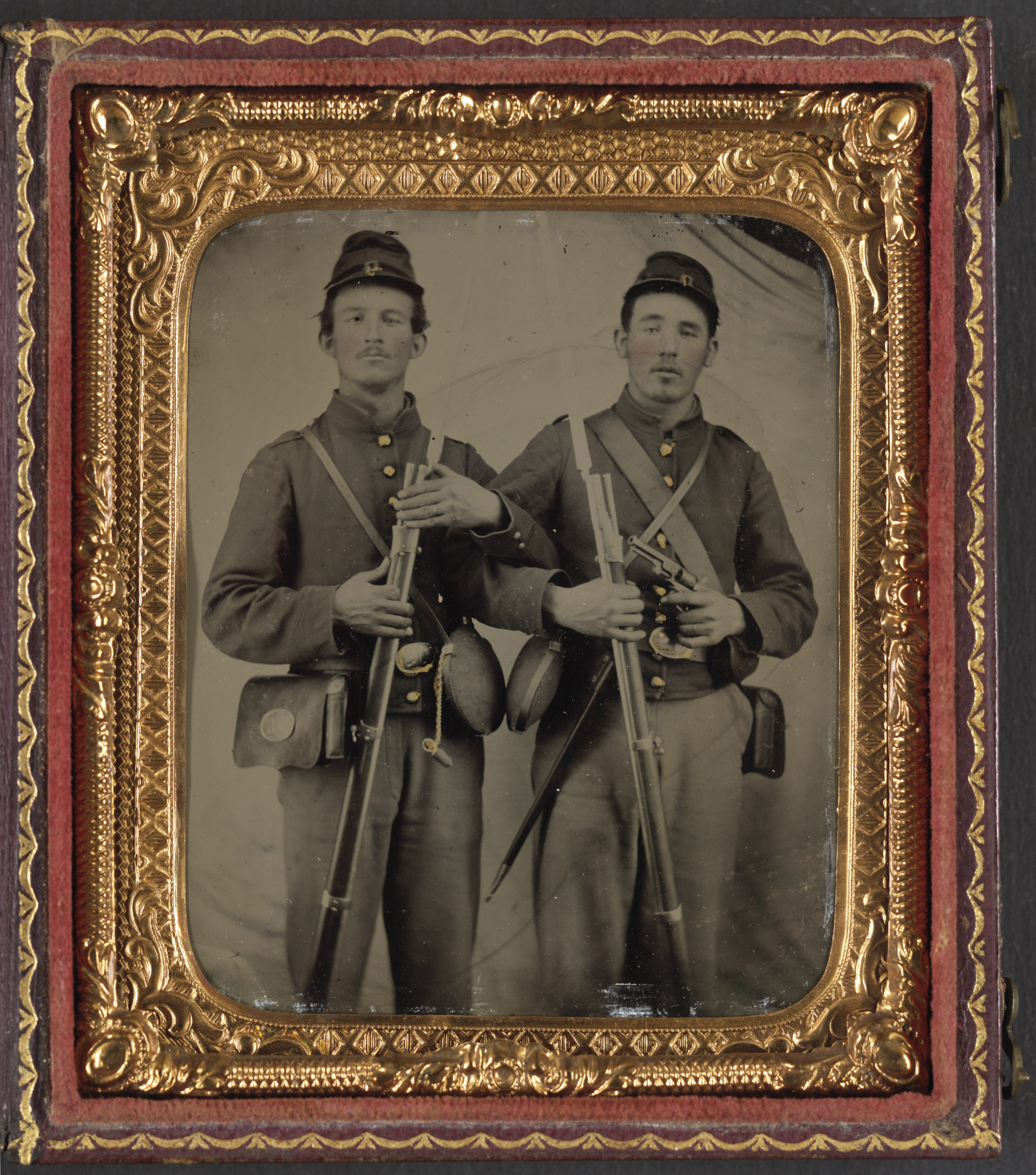
Union army troops armed with Prussian 1809 pattern muskets

The Model 1809 Prussian Musket, like its predecessor, was assembled at the Potzdam armory during the Napoleonic Wars. It had steel rather than brass barrel bands to reduce costs, and borrowed extensively from the design of the French Charleville Model 1777 Musket. The hammer (or cock) had a decorative heart-shaped cutout, and the steel pan had a protective shield to keep the powder dry in wet weather. The pins were abandoned in favour of three barrel bands. Unusually, the fore-sights were cast into the barrel band rather than the end of the barrel. Even more unusual for a military musket was, that the weapon had a V-notch.

The 1809 model had a 41.25-inch (1,048 mm) barrel and an overall length of 56.45 inches (1,434 mm), and weighed approximately 10 pounds (4.5 kg). The calibre was reduced to .71 (18.034 mm). The barrels were manufactured separately at Spandau, and were brought to Potzdam for finishing and final assembly.

At the Battle of Waterloo, the 1809 pattern Potzdam was the most widespread musket in use by von Blücher's troops. Due to its large bore, it could fire the cartridges of fallen British and French soldiers, although the smaller French bullets would rattle down the barrel and reduce accuracy and stopping power.

The socket bayonet of the M1809 musket was patterned after the bayonet of the French Charleville musket. Like most other bayonets of the early 19th century, it had a triangular 19.25-inch (489 mm) blade. But it lacked the mortise normally used to secure the bayonet over the fore-sights of the musket barrel.

=== Model 1831 ===
From 1831 to 1839, the Prussians manufactured a caplock conversion of the 1809 Potzdam musket. These were manufactured not only in Potzdam, but also in Danzig. Then starting in 1841 the musket was gradually replaced by the Dreyse needle gun, and most of the old muzzleloaders were sold to the Americans for use in their civil war. These were issued to the Union army as late as 1864.

== See also ==
- German military rifles
- List of wars involving Germany
- Military history of Germany
- Swedish Land Pattern Musket
- French Land Pattern Musket
- British Land Pattern Musket
- Spanish Land Pattern Musket
- American Land Pattern Musket
- Musket
- Rifle
- Carbine
