= Spandau Arsenal =

Imperial German military small arms development centre

The Spandau Gewehrfabrik (Spandau Rifle Factory), also known as Spandau Arsenal, was the centre for development of military small arms for Imperial Germany from the Industrial Revolution until 1919. Spandau engineered and tested improved infantry weapons.

== History ==
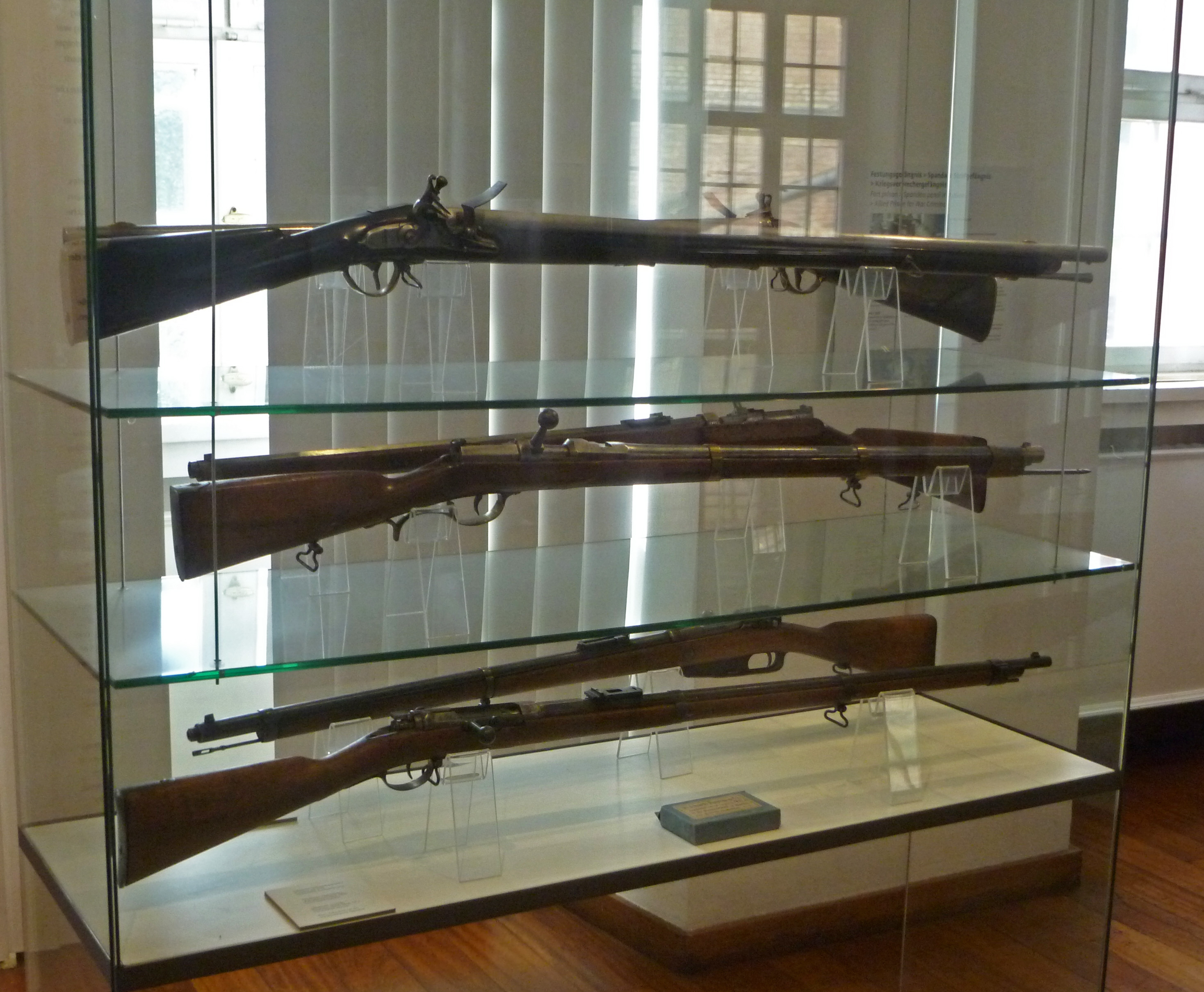
Historic German infantry rifles on display at the Spandau Citadel museum

The Royal Prussian Rifle Factory was established on the river Havel at Potsdam in 1722 by Frederick William I of Prussia. The facility was leased to private manufacturers until machinery was moved upstream to the confluence with river Spree in the westernmost Berlin borough of Spandau about 1850. Early arsenal operations were east of the Spandau Citadel, but the arsenal later expanded into the Renaissance fortress. Spandau became the focus of government small arms production through the Second Industrial Revolution until the arsenal was demilitarised by the Treaty of Versailles in 1919. Following demilitarisation, arsenal machinery was used for manufacture of civilian goods by the state-owned conglomerate Deutsche Werke AG. By the 1930s, the arsenal became a laboratory for development of organophosphate insecticides. The citadel became a museum following World War II.

== Firearms production ==
Weapons manufactured at Spandau included:

- Potsdam musket 1809
- Dreyse needle gun
- Mauser Model 1871
- Gewehr 1888
- Gewehr 98
- MG 08

== See also ==
- Deutsche Waffen und Munitionsfabriken, an earlier producer of the German Empire's Maxim guns
