= Brown Bess =

British flintlock musket

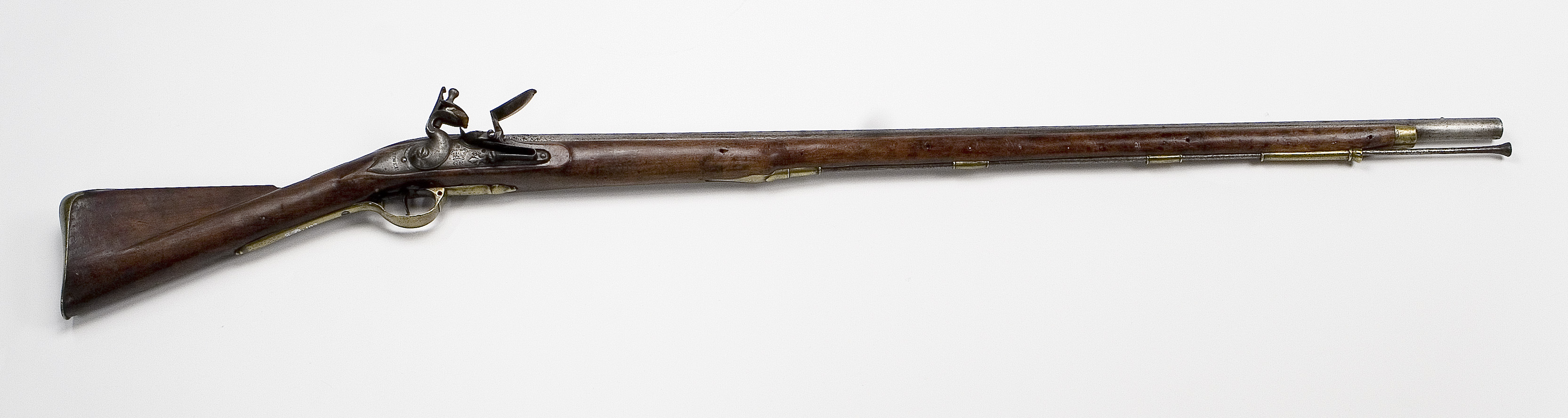
- A Short Land Pattern Musket
- Type: Flintlock musket
- Place of origin: Great Britain

Service history
- In service: 1722–1836
- Used by: See § Users
- Wars: First Anglo-Sikh War; Second Anglo-Sikh War; War of the Austrian Succession; Seven Years' War; Anglo-Mysore wars; Anglo-Maratha Wars; American Revolutionary War; French Revolutionary Wars; Napoleonic Wars; War of 1812; New Zealand Wars; First Opium War; Texas Revolution; Mexican–American War; Crimean War; Indian Rebellion of 1857; Reform War; American Civil War; Paraguayan War

Production history
- Designed: 1722
- Manufacturer: William Griece; Galton & Son; James Farmer; John Hirst et al.
- Produced: 1722–1850s (all variants)
- No. built: 7.8 million
- Variants: See § Variants

Specifications
- Mass: 8.7–10.12 lb (3.95–4.59 kg)
- Length: 42–62 in (1,100–1,600 mm)
- Barrel length: 26–46 in (660–1,170 mm)
- Cartridge: roundball
- Calibre: .75 in (19 mm)
- Action: flintlock
- Effective firing range: 100 yd (91 m) (point target)
- Feed system: Muzzle-loaded
- Sights: a single fore-sight that also doubles as a bayonet lug

"Brown Bess" is a nickname of uncertain origin for the British Army's muzzle-loading smoothbore flintlock Land Pattern Musket and its derivatives. The musket design remained in use for over a hundred years with many incremental changes in its design. These versions include the Long Land Pattern, the Short Land Pattern, the India Pattern, the New Land Pattern Musket, and the Sea Service Musket. The Brown Bess was the first standard service musket of the British Army from 1722 until 1836, though percussion cap conversions remained in limited use until the 1870s.

== Origins of the name ==
According to Jonathan Ferguson keeper of firearms and artillery at the Royal Armouries the name was adopted from slang for a mistress, prostitute, or lowly woman who also appear in period sources referred to as "Brown Bess". He writes, "'Bess' was a generic and sometimes derogatory name, a bit like 'Sheila' in modern Australian English", and "brown" simply meant plain or drab. Ferguson discounts, with evidence, many of the other theories previously popular—such as brown being a reference to the process of browning the barrels, corrosion on the barrel, or the color of the stock and "bess" being a corruption of the German term Büchse (lit. 'gun').

The earliest use of the term came from a letter by a young British clerk named John Grose, who in 1763 had joined the East India Company:

Every body in Calcutta are now turned soldiers on account of the troubles they all wear a Red Coat faced with blue which is the Regimental of the Calcutta Militia as we are called. Us new Writers were, a day or two after our arrival, saluted with a Coat, Pair of Breeches and musket (alias Brown Bess) thus equipped we go out upon the parade 3 times a week at 6 in the Morning in order to learn our Exercise.

Other references come from the anonymous book The Adventures of a Kidnapped Orphan published in 1767, were the protagonist Mr Page is pressed into service:

Page however was more tractable to discipline, than the major part of them, and had the mortification on that account, to hear the officers say, that he promised fair to make a useful fellow, as he began to handle Brown Bess with tolerable dexterity.

During the American Revolutionary War, there were satirical poems in numerous pamphlets and newspapers that made direct reference to the Brown Bess. For example, one such poem mocking General Gage’s proclamation of June 12, 1775, refers to a "musket brown". The first lexicographical respectively dictionary entry can be found in A Classical Dictionary of the Vulgar Tongue from 1785 were Brown Bess is described as a soldiers flintlock. The most prominent quote comes from Rudyard Kipling's 1911 poem Brown Bess.

In the days of lace-ruffles, perukes, and brocade
Brown Bess was a partner whom none could despise—
An out-spoken, flinty-lipped, brazen-faced jade,
With a habit of looking men straight in the eyes—
At Blenheim and Ramillies, fops would confess
They were pierced to the heart by the charms of Brown Bess ...

— Rudyard Kipling, "Brown Bess", 1911

During the Civil War, Confederate military records referred to the Pattern 1851 Enfield surplus muskets by several different names, including "Brown Bess Rifles 1851 Pattern," "Rifled Brown Bessies," "Old Army Pattern, rifled," "Second Hand Government Rifles," "Minié Rifles," and "Second Hand Rifles 1851 Pattern."

== Development ==
Following the Peace of Utrecht in 1713 that ended the War of Spanish Succession, the Board of Ordnance began a standardization of the various muskets. The old, flat brass breech cap was replaced with a hollow-cast heel which fit much better against the shooter’s shoulder. For the first time, a monogram plate was attached to the stock. The rounded side plate was adjusted for two screws. Until then, three screws had always been necessary to secure the lock. The rounded lock with a swan-neck cock and pointed steel was very similar to the William III pattern. The ramrod was fitted with an additional tail pipe at the point where it enters the stock. In its earliest form it had a 46 inches (1,200 mm) barrel a total length of 72 inches (1,800 mm). and a calibre of .75. The wooden ramrod was hold in place by three pipes. The loop behind the trigger guards was solid instead of having an open spur as in later models. Also introduced in 1722 was the Short Land musket which had a 42 inches (1,100 mm) barrel instead. Until 1748 all rammers were made from wood. From that date onwards the Board of Ordnance ordered all rammers for the infantry to be made of iron or steel (Note: Iron and steel were used synonymously,) while those of the cavalry remained wooden.

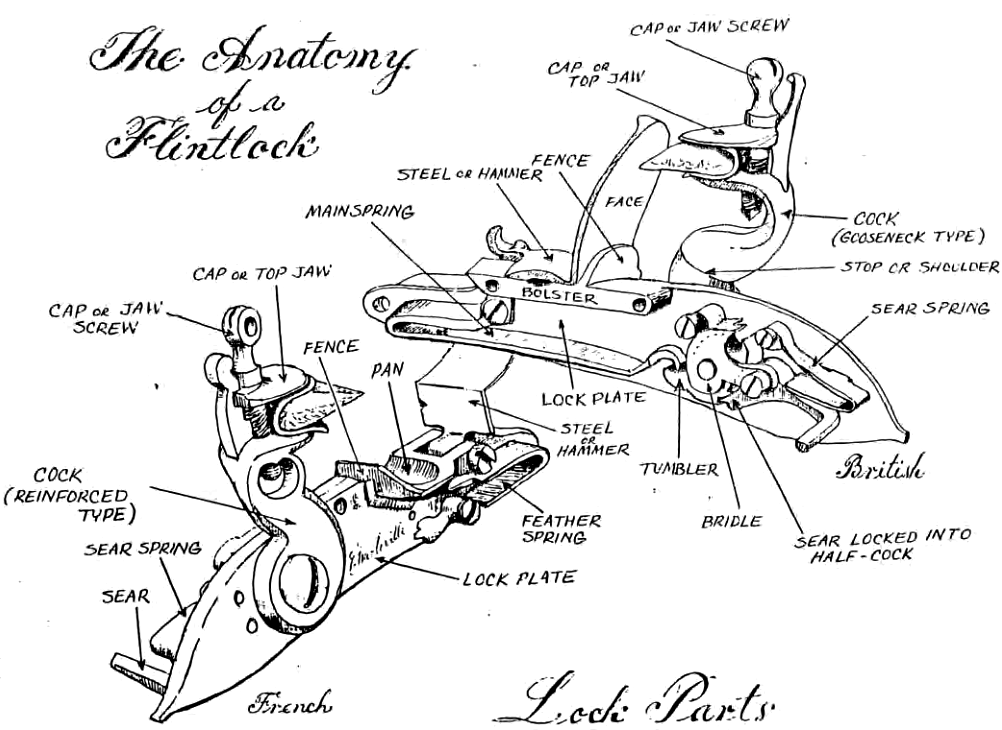
The Anatomy of a Flintlock

The accuracy of the Brown Bess was similar to other common muskets of that era. It ranged from 80 yards (73 m) to 100 yards (91 m). Around 1841, the Royal Engineers carried out a performance test. The results were disappointing. At 150 yards (140 m), a target approximately twice the height and width of a person was hit three times out of four. At any greater range, even when the musket was fixed in a rest, this same target was not hit at all. At 250 yards (230 m), a target twice as wide was fired at. None of the ten shots registered a hit, and there was no trace of the ball. According to Colonel H. C. B. Rogers the cartridge had a weight of 1.6 ounces (45 g) including lead ball and gun powder giving the Brown Bess a muzzle velocity of 1,500 feet per second (460 m/s)

The British military historian and weapons expert David Harding mentioned a weight of 0.314 ounces (8.9 g) to 0.376 ounces (10.7 g) of which 0.023 ounces (0.65 g) was used for priming. Giving a ball weight of 1.3 ounces (37 g) the claim that the Brown Bess reached a muzzle velocity of 1,500 feet per second (460 m/s) is based however on incorrectly executed tests. In 1845, Alfred Mordecai, a U.S. Army officer and weapons expert of the U.S. Army Ordnance Department, reached velocity of up to 2,000 feet per second (610 m/s) in trials, but he used a musket with a smaller caliber (0.69 inches (18 mm)) and lighter balls (approx. 0.9 ounces (26 g)). In addition, Mordecai used newer, more effective gunpowder and, in some cases, proof charges. The British mathematician and engineer Benjamin Robins also exceeded 1500 ft/s in 1742, but he used a powder charge of 0.63 ounces (18 g), which was nearly double the charge used in the field.

Although Henry Nock’s 1790s screwless-lock "Duke of Richmond" musket was designed as a superior alternative to the Brown Bess, it failed to achieve widespread adoption; constrained by the costs of mass production during the war with France, the British government ultimately prioritized the more economical, albeit lower-quality, standard-issue firearm.

== Service history ==
According to author Gordon L. Rottman, the Brown Bess is the longest serving pre-modern military rifle, being the standard British Army musket in upgraded forms over the years from 1722–1836, though it also saw limited use during the Crimean War (1853–1856), the Indian Mutiny (1857–1858), while percussion cap conversions remained in some capacity well into the 1870s.

Great Britain supplied significant consignments to Sweden for deployment during the Napoleonic Finnish War (1808–09), Britain also supplied large numbers of India Pattern Brown Bess muskets to its coalition allies, including the Prussians and Russians, After the Napoleonic Wars, surplus Brown Bess muskets were exported abroad, with some even ending up in the hands of the Māori of New Zealand, offering increased firepower over traditional weaponry. The muskets were sold to other Latin American revolutionaries and Native American tribes after the War of 1812.

The two subsequent modifications to the Norwegian forces were attributed to the adoption of the Brown Bess musket in 1834.

Sixty thousand muskets manufactured at Dublin Castle have been prepared for shipment to British forces stationed in colonial America.

The Brown Bess was also used by American revolutionaries (1775–1783) and exported to Mexico, where it saw use with the Mexican Army in the Texas Revolution (1835–1836), the musket made a famous engagement during the Siege of the Alamo. and the Mexican–American War (1846–1848). By December 1838, Mexico purchased a total of 18,542 surplus Indian pattern muskets from the British government or from private traders of the East India Company to arm their regular units.

At the surrender of Santa Anna later that year, large quantities of this musket fell into Texan hands. Subsequently, the Texan military transported to the new Houston Arsenal and put them to good use in the 1840s.

Mexican regular and National Guard units maintained the deployment of various smoothbore Brown Bess muskets and obsolete flintlock weaponry well into the 1860s, throughout the Mexican civil war period.

Pattern 1842 percussion cap conversions were exported to the United States and used during Mexican–American War, though several United States Army regulars were still using flintlocks at the time. These conversions—popularly known as the 'Tower' after the Tower of the London Royal Armouries where flintlock Brown Bess guns were converted—were used in quantity numbers by the Confederates during the American Civil War (1861–1865), particularly Shiloh. At same year, Winnebago warriors use flintlock gun in Dakota War of 1862 up to 1880.

Pattern 1842 Tower muskets and carbines were also used during the Paraguayan War (1864–1870), where it was outranged by the more accurate Minié rifles used by the Triple Alliance. Prior to the war, the Paraguayans imported about 20,000 surplus carbines and muskets from Brazil after 1852. Faced with an Allied naval blockade and lacking mercury to locally produce percussion caps, the Paraguayan Army also used old flintlock Brown Bess muskets.

A limited number of muskets were used by the Zulu at Isandlwana.

== Variations ==
=== Windus Pattern ===
The Windus Model 1771 Infantry Musket was a shorter, simplified version of the Short Land Pattern Brown Bess, designed for the East India Company’s European infantry in India; it was created under Lt. Col. Edward Windus. During the war against France, Britain faced a severe shortage of muskets. In 1793, the Board of Ordnance purchased 30,000 Windus Pattern muskets from the East India Company to arm rapidly expanding forces. By 1795–1797, the Board formally adopted the Windus design as the Model 1793 India Pattern, a cheaper, faster-to-produce Brown Bess variant.

=== Indian Pattern ===
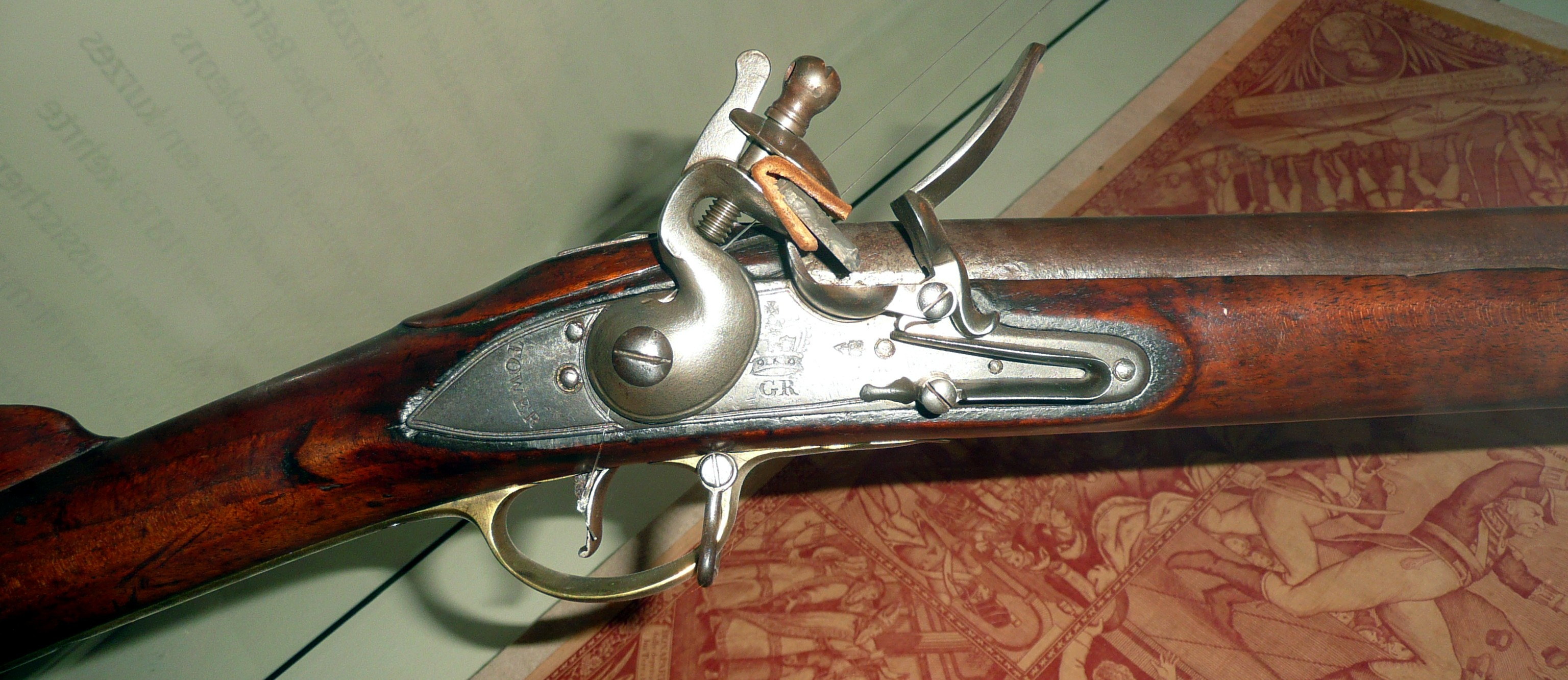
Firing mechanism of an India-pattern musket. Part of the original equipment of the Oldenburg Infantry Regiment. One of 3,000 muskets ceded to the Duchy of Oldenburg by the British in 1814.

Upon the outbreak of war with Revolutionary France the Board of Ordnance was faced with the lack of sufficient muskets to equip 250,000 men. The Board thus had to draw on the East India Company´s large arsenal, intended for Company use in India. By the end of 1794 some 29,000 muskets had been ceded to the Ordnance. Although the Short Land musket was still produced until 1796, gunsmiths were ordered to produce only the India Pattern. The India Pattern was of a lower quality with plainer brass furniture, no tail for the sideplate and a less elaborately molded trigger guard. The barrel had a length of 39-inch (990 mm) while the total length was 55-inch (1,400 mm). The whole weapon had a weight of around 9.11 pounds (4.13 kg). Apart from the introduction of a reinforced cock in 1809, there were no changes to the pattern during its manufacture until 1815.

=== New Land Pattern ===
With the end of the War of the Second Coalition in 1802 the Board of Ordnance introduced a new regular-service musket known as the New Land Pattern musket. The lock consisted of a 6 inches (150 mm) long flat plate and a flat ring-neck cock. Some of these cocks had an pronounced front curve, giving them a pot-bellied appearance. The mainspring on these locks was different to those on earlier models. Rather than being secured to the plate by a screw, the fixed end of the spring had a tenon that fitted into a notch in the wide edge of the plate. While some of these locks were plain, many had a small engraved sprig on the tail of the lock and sometimes on the cock too. Each lock plate was checked with a pattern, ensuring that the tumbler and screw holes were properly aligned.

The steel rammer, which had a swell at the muzzle end, was held in place by two small pipes and a long trumpet pipe. There was no tail pipe. Instead of the high comb and long wrist, the simple stock of Henry Nock's guns was used. Also retained was the flat key mechanism that held the barrel to the stock, the break-off breech was however not fitted. The 42-inch barrel had only a bayonet stud acting as a foresight. The breech was plain, without the traditional baluster decorations, and there was no longer any wood carving around the barrel tang.The trigger guard was significantly shorter (the rear end piece was held in place by a single screw), and the ends of the finials were rounded. The butt plate also had a simple, rounded tongue.

The New Land Pattern was derived from the preceding Indian Pattern musket, while also integrating specific design elements introduced in the Duke of Richmond’s models between 1792 and 1796.

=== New Light Infantry Land Pattern ===
The New Land Pattern Light Infantry Musket was introduced shortly after the Treaty of Amiens (1802). However, the peace lasted so briefly that only a small number of these muskets were produced before 1815. By 1811, the total number was about 20,000. The 39-inch (990 mm) barrel was also held in place by three flat keys and the upper sling swivel screw. The bayonet retaining pin continued to serve as the front sight, but a notched block rear sight was soldered onto the barrel 3 inches (76 mm) in front of the tail screw. The butt plate had a simple, rounded tongue; the escutcheon on the neck and the wood carvings on the barrel tang were omitted. The barrel tang now had parallel sides and was rounded at the end. The comb of the butt was shaped to be lower and wider. It also integrated the updated Hanoverian bayonet catch mechanism.

The sideplate followed the India Pattern with a rounded contour, but was held in place in the center by a wood screw and was not recessed into the stock. The rounded trigger guard had a short finial held in place by a single screw. The trigger swung in a housing on a box trigger plate housing. The lower leg of the steel spring had a bevel, and the lock plate protruded slightly above the stock surface. The upper ramrod pipe retained the trumpet pattern. The remaining two tubes reverted to the earlier Land Pattern: the second tube was straight-tapered, and the third was barrel-shaped. There was also no tailpipe. The fore-end cap had a lip on its rear lower edge that served to hold the ramrod securely in place.

=== Sea Service Pattern ===
The Sea Service musket was available in two versions, with short and long barrels; both could have a blackened or a polished barrel. The barrel length varied between 36 inches (910 mm) and 38 inches (970 mm). The barrel was held in place by three pins. The flat lock was secured with three lock screws. The brass sideplate, which was also flat, was flush with the wood. The stock extended all the way to the muzzle. There were no means of attaching a bayonet or for ling swivels. Two barrel-shaped brass pipes held the wooden ramrod with a brass tip. Apart from the introduction of steel ramrods in the 1750s, the Sea Service Musket was manufactured in this general pattern until around 1760, when the conventional, rounded Land Pattern lock came into general use. Starting in the 1760s, the front of the trigger guard was drilled through and fitted with a sling swivel. In addition, the forend was shortened to allow for the use of the socket bayonet. None of the Sea Service muskets had a trigger plate; the trigger operated through a simple slot cut directly into the wood. The barrel tang was screwed into a square iron plate that was recessed into the wood just in front of the trigger.

=== 1842 Pattern ===
After trials were conducted with flintlocks and percussion cap muskets in 1834 by the Ordnance Department under several weather types, the British government ordered the conversion of existing stocks of Brown Bess muskets into caplocks, which are less prone to misfiring. The process of conversion started in 1839 at the Tower of London, though it was delayed after a fire in 1841 destroyed several guns awaiting conversion.

The Pattern 1842 musket—commonly known as the Tower musket—retained the smoothbore barrel of the Brown Bess, which gave the Tower poor accuracy at ranges beyond 100 yd (91 m).

== Manufacturing ==
Most of the production sites were located in Birmingham and London, where gunsmiths such as James Farmer, Samuel Galton, William Griece, Daniel and George Whately, Richard & James Waller, and John Hirst were the main producers of the Brown Bess. The exact number of pieces produced cannot be determined with certainty; the historian David G. Chandler estimates that there were probably about 7.8 million. Of these, about 1.7 million alone were likely produced during the Napoleonic Wars. The cost of a single piece was around 17 Shilling, 4 Pence in 1741.

== Users ==
- Argentina – Pattern 1842 'Tower' musket and carbines
- Empire of Brazil – Tower muskets were withdrawn from service and sold to Paraguay prior to the Paraguayan War
- British Empire
- Confederate States of America – Limited use of Tower muskets
- Gran Colombia
- East India Company
- Māori tribes
- Maratha Empire
- Mexico
- Prussia
- Paraguay – Tower muskets were used by infantry units and carbines by regular cavalry units
- Republic of Texas
- Russian Empire - Sixty-thousand were purchase, issued to Moscow Grenadier Regiment
- (yes) Sweden - Subsequent to the Napoleonic wars in the North, Sweden acquired a consignment comprising 23,000 muskets, alongside 6.3 million cartridges and 350,000 flints
- United States

== See also ==
- Charleville musket
- Potzdam musket
- Spanish Land Pattern Musket
- Swedish Land Pattern Musket
- J. Bishop Model 1812 Musket

== Bibliography ==
- Bailey, De Witt (1997). Pattern Dates for British Ordnance Small Arms, 1718–1783. Gettysburg: Thomas Publications. ISBN 1-57747-016-8.
- Bailey, De Witt (1971). British Military Longarms, 1715–1815. Harrisburg: Stackpole Books.
- Blackmore, Howard L. (1994). British Military Firearms, 1650–1850. London: Greenhill Books. ISBN 1-85367-172-X.
- Chandler, David (1995). The Art of Warfare in the Age of Marlborough. New York: Sarpedon. ISBN 1-885119-14-3.
- Dawson, Joseph G. (1999). Doniphan's Epic March: The 1st Missouri Volunteers in the Mexican War. Lawrence, Kansas: University Press of Kansas. ISBN 978-0-7006-0956-7.
- Esposito, Gabriele (2015). Armies of the War of the Triple Alliance 1864–70: Paraguay, Brazil, Uruguay & Argentina (ePDF ed.). Oxtford, UK: Osprey Publishing. ISBN 978-1-4728-0726-7.
- Ferguson, Jonathan (2 January 2017). "'Trusty Bess': the Definitive Origins and History of the term 'Brown Bess'". Arms & Armour. 14 (1). Routledge: 49–69. doi:10.1080/17416124.2017.1293886. ISSN 1741-6124.
- Haecker, Charles M. (1997). On the Prairie of Palo Alto: Historical Archaeology of the U.S.–Mexican War Battlefield. Texas A&M University Press. ISBN 978-1-60344-355-5.
- Halbrook, Stephen P. (2008). The Founders' Second Amendment : Origins of the Right to Bear Arms. Chocago: Ivan R. Dee. ISBN 978-1-56663-792-3.
- Haythornthwaite, Philip (1979). Weapons and Equipment of the Napoleonic Wars. Poole: Plandford Press. ISBN 0-7137-0906-5.
- Hughes, B. P. (1974). Firepower: weapons effectiveness on the battlefield, 1630–1850. London: Arms and Armour Press. ISBN 978-0-85368-229-5.
- Knight, Ian (2013). The New Zealand Wars 1820–72 (ePDF ed.). Oxford, UK: Bloomsbury Publishing. ISBN 978-1-78096-278-8.
- LeClair, Daniel R. (2019). The British Military Revolution of the 19th Century: "The Great Gun Question" and the Modernization of Ordnance and Administration. Jefferson, North Carolina: McFarland & Company. ISBN 978-1-4766-7499-5.
- Naravane, M. S. (2006). Battles of the Honourable East India Company: Making of the Raj. New Delhi, India: APH Publishing. ISBN 978-81-313-0034-3.
- Refshauge, W. F. (September 2015). "A note on physical properties of musket fire". Journal of Conflict Archaeology. 10 (3). Taylor & Francis: 149–153. doi:10.1080/15740773.2016.1181854. JSTOR 48601634.
- Rottman, Gordon L. (2013). The Book of Gun Trivia: Essential Firepower Facts (ePDF ed.). Oxford, UK: Osprey Publishing. ISBN 978-1-78200-621-3.
- Reid, Stuart (2016). The flintlock musket Brown Bess and Charleville 1715–1865. Oxford: Osprey Publishing. ISBN 978-1-4728-1095-3.
- Rodgers, H. C. B. (1960). Weapons Of The British Soldier. London: Seeley Service & Co.
- Cooney, Jeremy W. (2004). "Economy and Manpower: Paraguay at War 1864–1869". In Kraay, Hendrik; Whigham, Thomas (eds.). I Die with My Country Perspectives on the Paraguayan War, 1864–1870. University of Nebraska Press. ISBN 978-0-8032-2762-0.
