= Model 1822 Musket =

Springfield Model 1822
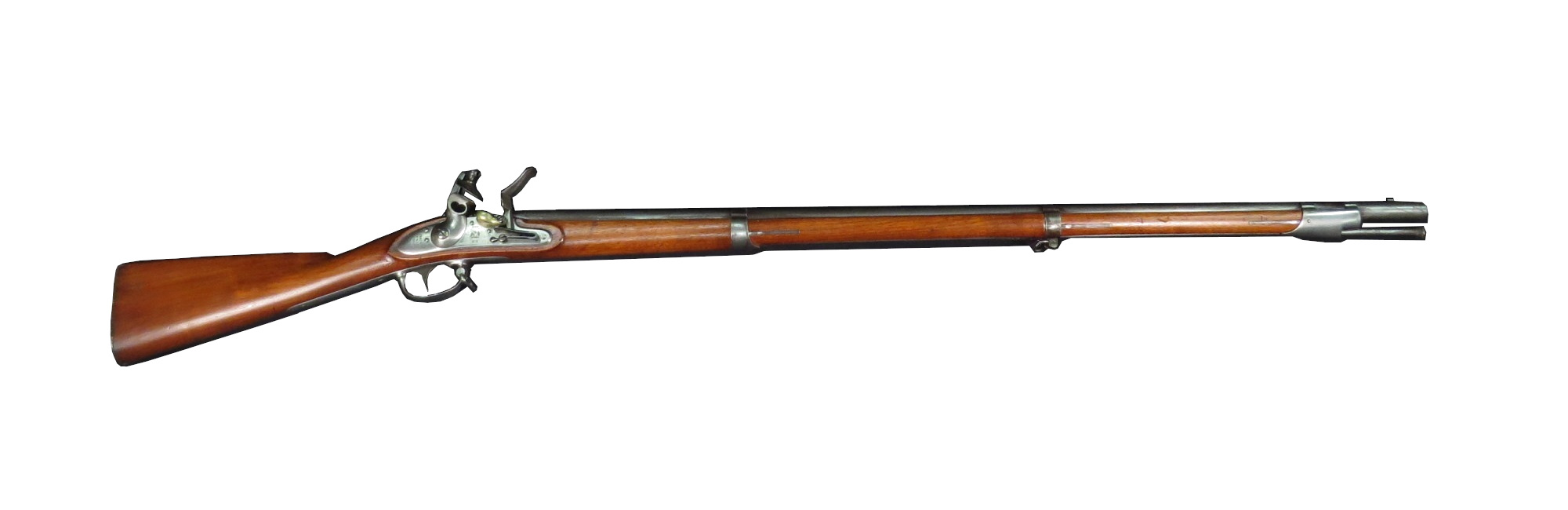
- Type: Musket
- Place of origin: United States

Service history
- In service: 1822–1865
- Used by: United States; Confederate States; France
- Wars: American Indian Wars; Anti-piracy operations in Aegean Sea; Mexican–American War; American Civil War; Second French intervention in Mexico

Production history
- Designer: Eli Whitney
- Designed: 1822
- Manufacturer: Springfield Armory; Harpers Ferry Armory; Various private contractors
- Produced: 1822–1835

Specifications
- Mass: 9 lb (4.1 kg)
- Length: 58 in (1,500 mm)
- Barrel length: 42 in (1,100 mm)
- Cartridge: Paper cartridge, buck and ball/musket ball (.65/16.510 mm) undersized to reduce the effects of powder fouling
- Caliber: .69 in (17.526 mm)
- Action: Flintlock/percussion lock (conversion)
- Rate of fire: User dependent; usually 2 to 3 rounds per minute
- Muzzle velocity: 1,000 ft/s (300 m/s) to 1,400 ft/s (430 m/s)
- Effective firing range: 50 to 100 yd (46 to 91 m) (smoothbore); 200 to 400 yd (180 to 370 m) (rifled)
- Maximum firing range: 150 to 300 yd (140 to 270 m) (smoothbore); 800 to 1,000 yd (730 to 910 m) (rifled)
- Feed system: Muzzle-loaded
- Sights: A front sight cast into the upper barrel band, rear sight (percussion/rifled conversion)

The Springfield Model 1822 was a .69 caliber flintlock musket manufactured by the United States in the early 19th century.

== Overview ==
The Model 1822 was an improvement to the Springfield Model 1816. Some documents refer to the Model 1822 as its own separate model, but other documents refer to it as a variant of the Model 1816 designated as the Type II.

Like the Model 1816, the Model 1822 was a .69 caliber smoothbore flintlock, with a 42-inch (110 cm) barrel and an overall length of 58 inches (150 cm). One of the most noticeable differences in the Model 1822 is the attachment of the lower sling swivel. The forward part of the trigger guard was provided with an enlargement which was drilled to receive the sling swivel rivet. Previously, the sling swivel had been affixed to a stud in front of the trigger guard.

== History ==
In addition to the Springfield and Harpers Ferry armories, the Model 1822 was produced by numerous other independent contractors. It was eventually replaced by the Springfield Model 1835, which is also considered by many to be a continuation of the Model 1816 designated as the Type III. A total of 14,000 M1824 muskets were delivered to the Springfield Armory inventory in 1824.

Like other flintlocks, many of the Model 1822 muskets were converted to percussion lock in the 1840s and 1850s, as percussion caps were more reliable and weather resistant than flintlocks. However, during the Mexico City campaign, General Winfield Scott insisted on his army being equipped with flintlock muskets because flints were easy to make or procure, important in a hostile country where supply lines were vulnerable.

Some Model 1822 muskets also had their barrels rifled so that they could fire the newly invented Minié ball if the barrel was thick enough and structurally sound. However, the increase in breech pressure created by the new expanding bullet was too much for the conversion process and older musket barrels to contain and rifled Model 1822 muskets were issued instead with standard .69 caliber round balls.

The Model 1822 was used in both the Mexican–American War and the American Civil War. During the latter, .69 caliber muskets (mostly percussion, but some flintlocks as well) were common in the early part of the war (either in their original form or converted to rifling). They had totally disappeared from the Army of the Potomac by the second half of 1862 (aside from the Irish Brigade, which carried Springfield Model 1842 muskets until 1864), but the less-well equipped Confederate Army used them for longer, and the Army of Northern Virginia's ordnance chief claimed that Gettysburg was the first battle in which the army was completely free of smoothbore muskets.

Many alteration systems in the U.S. arsenal, specifically alterations to percussion, were performed by the Belgian or Cone In Barrel system. This alteration process was performed by various arsenals, including Springfield, Harper's Ferry, and Watervliet, between 1849 and 1854. M1822 later adopt the maynard conversion rifle musket by Remington.

In the Western Theater, the situation was worse for both sides and smoothbores remained in use in the Union armies into 1863. Some Confederate regiments were still carrying .69 caliber muskets at the Battle of Franklin in November 1864. Under the provisions of the Militia Act of 1808, Pomeroy was contracted to produce the US Model 1822 Flintlock Musket for the State of North Carolina between 1812 and 1861. Musket served during the Cherokee disturbances and their eventual removal (1836-1839) and later with the 1st North Carolina Volunteer Infantry during the Mexican-American War. Prior to the US Civil War, the state’s substantial inventory of flintlock weaponry—including muskets, rifles, and pistols—underwent conversion to percussion systems, conducted primarily at the former Federal Arsenal in Fayetteville, North Carolina, and by private contractors such as M.A. Baker.

The French equipped the M1822 .69 caliber, converted to percussion, which formed a core part of French expeditionary forces' armament during the Mexican campaign.

== See also ==
- Springfield musket

Preceded by Springfield Model 1816	United States military musket 1822-1835	Succeeded by Springfield Model 1835
