= Springfield Model 1855 =

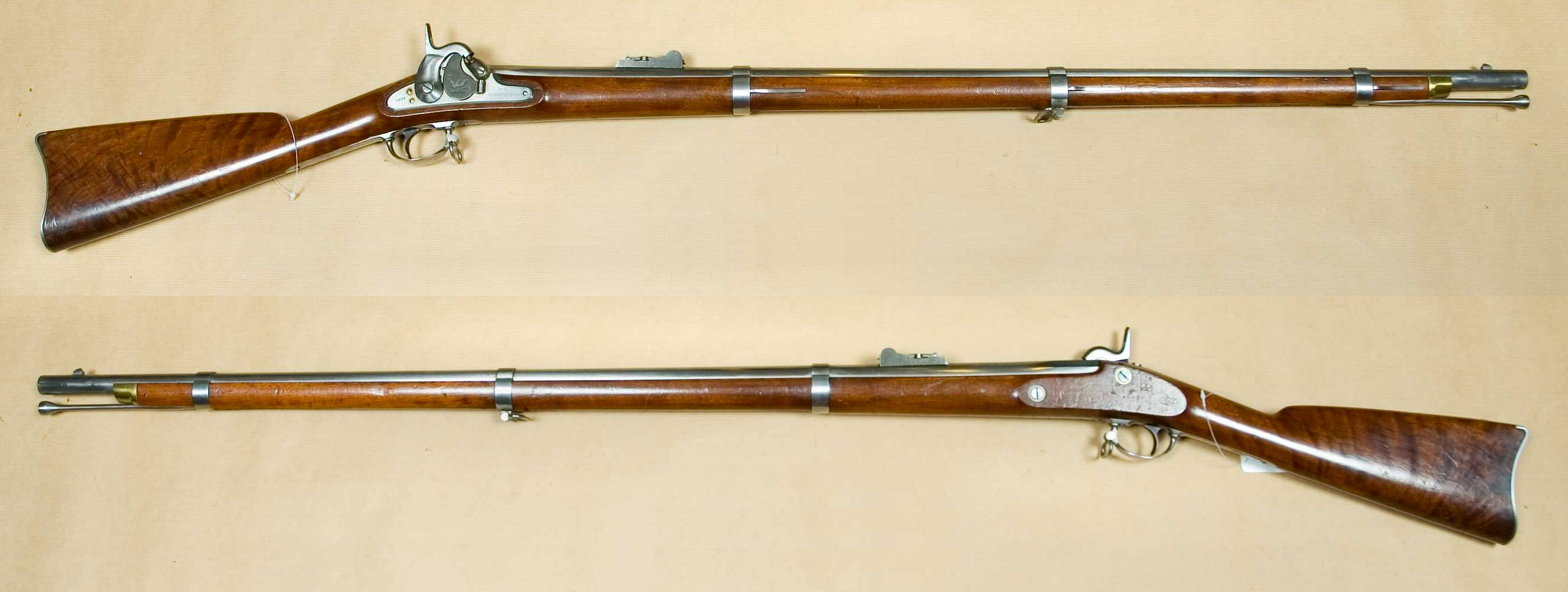
- Type: Rifled musket
- Place of origin: United States

Service history
- In service: 1856–1865
- Used by: United States; Confederate States; Japan; Argentina
- Wars: American Indian Wars; Utah War; Reform War; American Civil War; Kantō Insurrection; Conflict in Chōshu; War of Triple Alliance

Production history
- Designer: United States Army Ordnance Department, Edward Maynard
- Designed: 1855
- Manufacturer: Springfield Armory; Harpers Ferry Armory; Whitney Armory
- Unit cost: $20 $655 in 2023
- Produced: 1856–1860
- No. built: c. 75,000
- Variants: Type I, Type II, two band short rifle, pistol-carbine

Specifications
- Mass: 9.25 lb (4.20 kg)
- Length: 56 in (1,400 mm)
- Barrel length: 40 in (1,000 mm)
- Cartridge: Paper cartridge, Minié ball undersized to reduce the effects of powder fouling and for the skirt to grip the grooves when firing
- Caliber: .58 (14.7320 mm)
- Action: Maynard tape primer/percussion lock
- Rate of fire: User dependent; usually 2 to 3 rounds per minute
- Muzzle velocity: 1,000 ft/s (300 m/s) to 1,400 ft/s (430 m/s)
- Effective firing range: 200 to 400 yd (180 to 370 m)
- Maximum firing range: 800 to 1,000 yd (730 to 910 m)
- Feed system: Muzzle-loaded
- Sights: Open sights

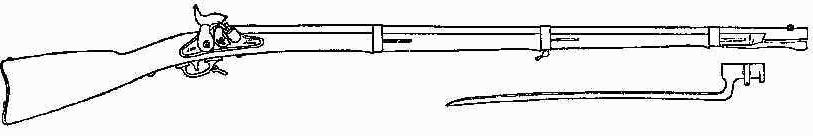
Diagram of a Springfield Model 1855 rifled musket and bayonet from "Rules for Management & Cleaning of the Rifle Musket – Model 1855" Washington Government Printing Office, 1862

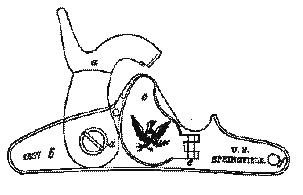
Diagram of a Springfield Model 1855 rifled musket's lock mechanism from "Rules for Management & Cleaning of the Rifle Musket – Model 1855" Washington Government Printing Office, 1862

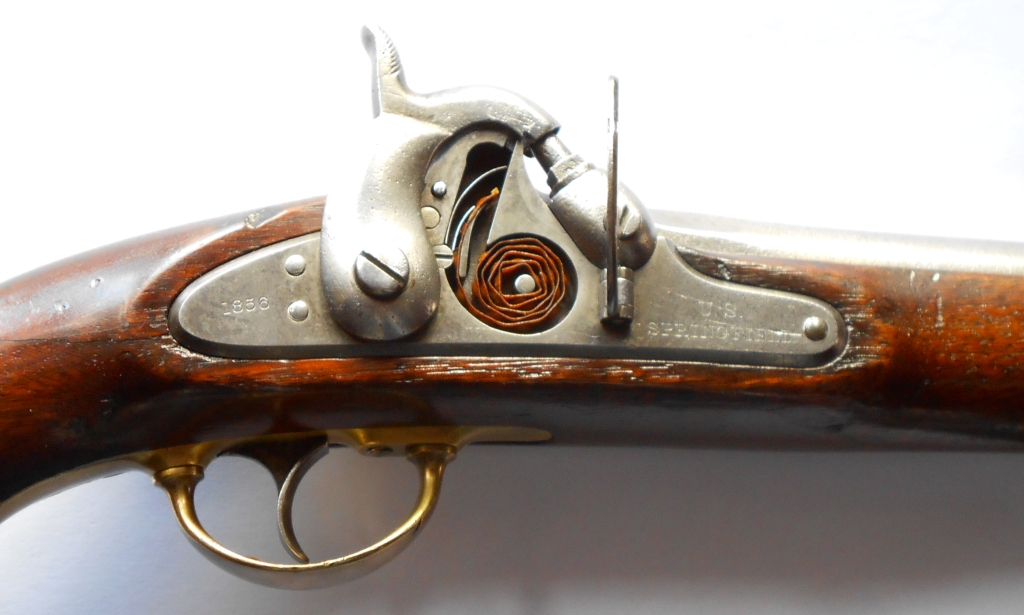
Springfield Model 1855 with Maynard tape primer mechanism

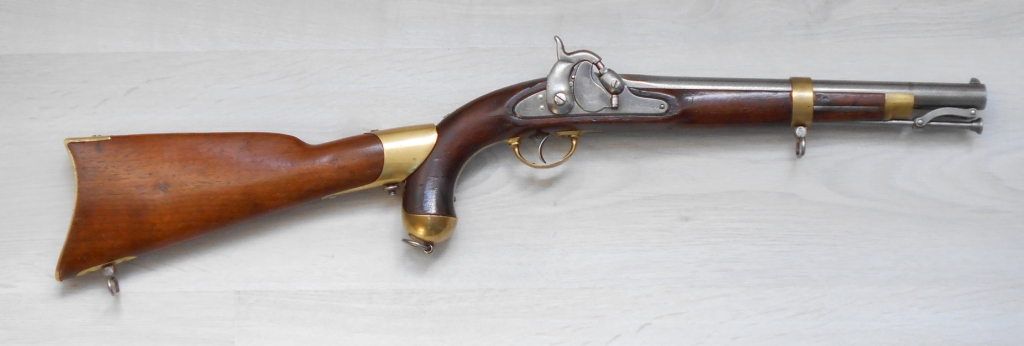
Springfield Model 1855 pistol-carbine

The Springfield Model 1855 is a rifled musket that was widely used in the American Civil War. It exploited the advantages of the new conical Minié ball, which could be deadly at over 1,000 yards (910 m). It was a standard infantry weapon for Union and Confederates alike, until the Springfield Model 1861 supplanted it, obviating the use of the insufficiently weather resistant Maynard tape primer.

== Origins ==
The Model 1855 Springfield was a rifled musket used in the mid-19th century. It was manufactured by the Springfield Armory in Massachusetts and at the Harpers Ferry Armory in Virginia (modern-day West Virginia) along with the Whitney Armory.

Earlier muskets had mostly been smoothbore flintlocks. In the 1840s, the unreliable flintlocks had been replaced by much more reliable and weather resistant percussion locks. The smoothbore barrel and inaccurate round ball were also being replaced by rifled barrels and the newly invented Minié ball. While older muskets had an effective range of about 50 to 100 yards (46–91 m), the Model 1855 had an effective range of 400 yards (370 m) and was deadly to over 1,000 yards (910 m).

Following Pattern 1853 Enfield and the Lorenz rifle, the barrel on the Model 1855 was .58 caliber, which was smaller than previous muskets. The Springfield Model 1816 and all of its derivatives up through the Springfield Model 1842 had been .69 caliber, about the same as all European muskets since 18th century, but tests conducted by the U.S. Army showed that the smaller .58 caliber was more accurate when used with a Minié ball.

The Model 1855 also used the Maynard tape primer, which was an attempt at improving the percussion cap system that had been previously developed. Instead of using individual caps which had to be placed for every shot, the Maynard system used a tape which was automatically fed every time the hammer was cocked, similar to the way a modern child's cap gun works. While the powder and Minié ball still had to be loaded conventionally, the tape system was designed to automate the placing of the percussion cap and therefore speed up the overall rate of fire of the weapon.

The Maynard tape system gave the Model 1855 a unique hump under the rifled musket's hammer. The weapon could also be primed in the usual way with standard percussion caps if the tape was unavailable. The Secretary of War at the time, Jefferson Davis, authorized the adoption of the Maynard system for the Model 1855.

In the field, the Maynard tape primer proved to be unreliable. Tests conducted between 1859 and 1860 found that half of the primers misfired, and also reported that the tape primer springs did not feed well.

A Japanese replica of the U.S. Model 1855 Springfield Rifle, featuring an integrated Maynard-style priming system, following its provision by the United States in 1860. The Edo government might issued M1855 and other copy to its troops during Bakumatsu period.

The greatest problem was the actual tape itself. Despite being advertised as waterproof, the paper strips proved to be susceptible to moisture. An attempt was made to remedy this problem by making the tape primers out of foil, but despite the improvement this brought, the United States Army Ordnance Department abandoned the Maynard system and went back to the standard percussion lock in later rifled muskets like the Model 1861.

Most Model 1855 rifled muskets were used throughout the Civil War with standard percussion caps. Pre-war militia allotments sent M1855s to both Northern and Southern states under the Militia Act of 1808.

Approximately 75,000 Model 1855 rifled muskets were produced. Northern states received their own allotments (Connecticut 1,020, Kansas 600, Maine 580, etc.) and that the 7th New York Militia received 1,000 M1855s in 1858 plus 2,951 more in 1861. While Southern totals cited: Florida (100), Georgia (1,225), Tennessee (701 rifle-muskets + 381 cadet), Alabama (150 cadet), Louisiana (1,099 seized from Baton Rouge Arsenal, Jan. 10, 1861), Confederate units that fielded them include the 13th Louisiana Infantry Battalion (Orleans Guards) at Shiloh and the 1st Regular Louisiana Infantry.

The machinery to make the Model 1855 rifled muskets, at Harpers Ferry was captured by the Confederate Army in early 1861. The captured machinery to produce rifled muskets was taken to Richmond Armory, where it formed the backbone of Confederate weapon manufacturing capability. The rifled musket machinery was taken to Fayetteville Arsenal, North Carolina where it too was put to use for significant arms production throughout the War. As a result of using the original arsenal machinery, the Richmond rifles and the Fayetteville rifles were two of the finest weapons produced by the Confederacy. Under the direct supervision of Virginia master armorer Salmon Adams and Ordnance Lieutenant Colonel James Burton, the captured machinery was promptly relocated to Richmond, establishing the foundational infrastructure for Confederate weapons production.

The Model 1855 was in production from 1856 until 1860 and was the standard-issue firearm of the Regular Army in the pre-Civil War years.

The need for large numbers of weapons at the start of the American Civil War saw the Model 1855 simplified by the removal of the Maynard tape primer and a few other minor alterations to make it cheaper and easier to manufacture, thus creating the ubiquitous Model 1861. The Model 1855 was the best arm available at the beginning of the conflict as it took some time for the Model 1861s to be manufactured and actually reach the field. However, less than 80,000 Model 1855 rifled muskets had been manufactured by the start of the war. Some of them were destroyed when the Confederate military captured the Harpers Ferry arsenal in April 1861, and several thousand more were in Southern hands. Approximately 10,000 rifled muskets had also been shipped to California, and therefore were useless for the Union war effort.

Springfield M1855/59 rifles were imported into the port of Buenos Aires during conflicts in South America.

== First use ==
The Model 1855 served as a field evaluation for the new .58 caliber rifled musket during the military expedition commanded by A.S. Johnston. Although it was initially issued as legacy caplock smoothbore muskets remained in service, its deployment during the disturbances in Utah represented one of its first operational uses.

The Model 1855 got its another test in September 1858 in the Pacific Northwest at the Battle of Four Lakes (Spokane Plains) where the Northern tribes greatly outnumbered U.S. troops. The attacking Native Americans were dispatched by U.S. troops armed with the Model 1855 rifled musket before they could get in range with their smoothbores. Lt. Lawrence Kip noted: "Strange to say, not one of our men was injured...This was owing to the long range rifles now first used by our troops... Had these men been armed with those formerly used, the result of the fight, as to the loss on our side, would have been far different, for the enemy outnumbered us, and had all of the courage that we are accustomed to ascribe to Indian savages. But they were panic-struck by the effect of our fire at such great distances."

By the spring of 1857, one squadron of the 1st Cavalry was equipped with M1855 pistol carbines. Second Lieutenant Eli Long’s Company “H” and Captain Eugene Carr’s Company “I” were outfitted with M1855 pistol carbines, Greene carbines, Colt and Adams revolvers, and M1840 dragoon sabers, while the remainder of the regiment utilized M1847 musketoons. Under the command of Colonel Edward V. Summers, the 1st U.S. Cavalry departed Fort Leavenworth in May 1857 to conduct field operations against the Cheyenne.

== Variants ==
The Model 1855 is generally referred to as a rifled musket, since it was the same length as the muskets that it replaced. It had a 40-inch (100 cm) long barrel, and an overall length of 56 inches (140 cm). Three rifle bands held the barrel to the stock. A shorter two band version, generally referred to as the Harpers Ferry Model 1855 rifle, was also produced. This shorter rifle had a 33-inch (84 cm) barrel and an overall length of 49 inches (120 cm).

A pistol-carbine of the Model 1855 was produced as well.

The Model 1855 rifled musket was modified in 1858 to include a simpler rear sight (the typical flip-up leaf type), a patch box on the side of the buttstock, and an iron nosecap to replace the brass one. This variant is sometimes referred to as the Type II with the earlier model designated the Type I.

== See also ==
- Springfield rifle
- Springfield musket

Preceded by Springfield Model 1842	United States military rifle 1855–1861	Succeeded by Springfield Model 1861
