= Springfield Model 1835 =

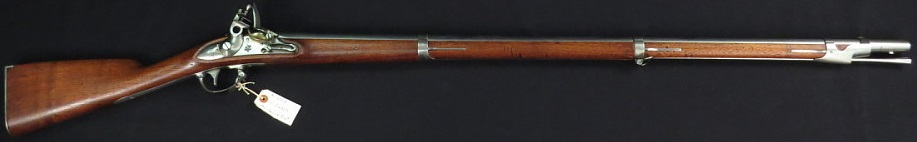
- Type: Musket
- Place of origin: United States

Service history
- In service: 1835–1865
- Used by: United States; Confederate States
- Wars: American Indian Wars; Patriot War; Mexican–American War; American Civil War

Production history
- Designed: 1835
- Manufacturer: Springfield Armory; Harpers Ferry Armory; Various private contractors
- Produced: 1835–1840

Specifications
- Mass: 10 lb (4.5 kg)
- Length: 58.0 in (1,470 mm)
- Barrel length: 42.0 in (1,070 mm)
- Cartridge: Paper cartridge, buck and ball/musket ball (.65/16.510 mm) undersized to reduce the effects of powder fouling
- Caliber: .69 in (17.526 mm)
- Action: Flintlock/percussion lock (conversion)
- Rate of fire: User dependent; usually 2 to 3 rounds per minute
- Muzzle velocity: 1,000 ft/s (300 m/s) to 1,400 ft/s (430 m/s)
- Effective firing range: 50 to 100 yd (46 to 91 m) (smoothbore); 200 to 400 yd (180 to 370 m) (rifled)
- Maximum firing range: 150 to 300 yd (140 to 270 m) (smoothbore); 800 to 1,000 yd (730 to 910 m) (rifled)
- Feed system: Muzzle-loaded
- Sights: A front sight cast into the upper barrel band, rear sight (percussion/rifled conversion)

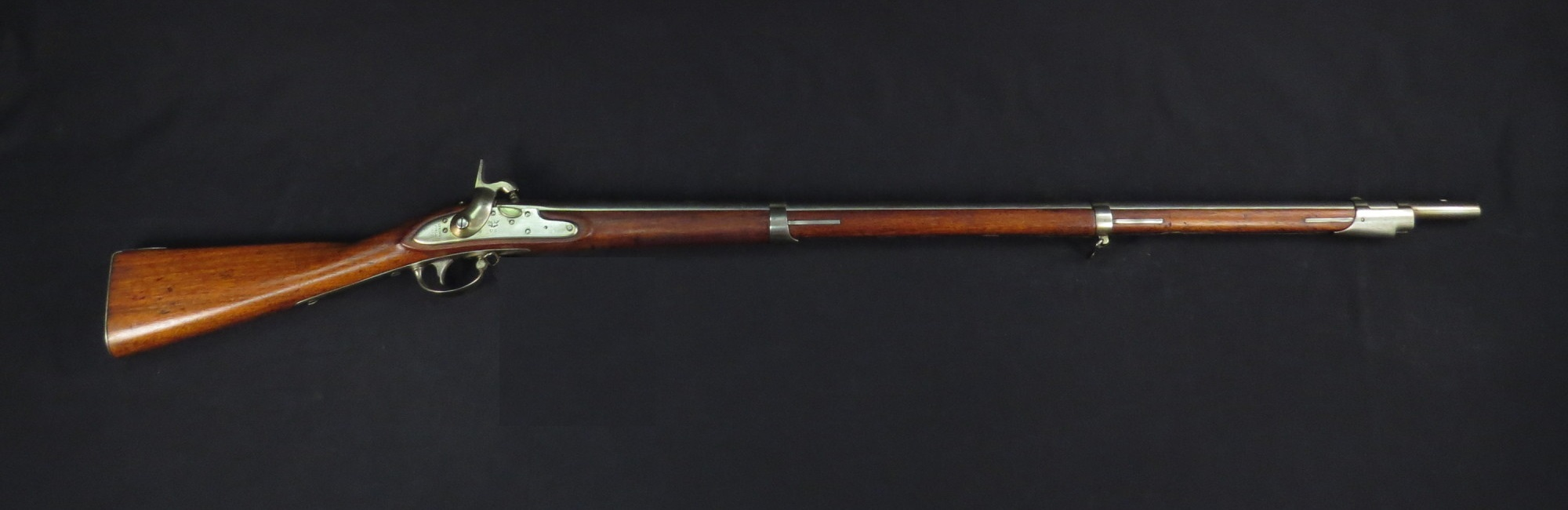
Springfield Model 1835 percussion lock conversion

The Springfield Model 1835 was a .69 caliber flintlock musket manufactured in the United States during the early to mid-19th century.

== Overview ==
The Model 1835 was manufactured by the Springfield and Harpers Ferry armories and also produced by other independent contractors. It was a smoothbore musket and fired a .69 caliber round ball.

The Model 1835 is sometimes considered to be its own model number, but is often considered to be just a continuation of the Springfield Model 1816 designated as the Type III.

== History ==
The M1835 was derived base from the French M1822T Grenadier musket, directly preceded the extensively manufactured Model 1840 Springfield musket. Harpers Ferry built Hall carbine and the Model 1835 unit.

The barrel was slightly longer than the Model 1816 and the total weight of the Model 1835 was slightly higher, but otherwise the Model 1835 was very similar to the Model 1816.

Even though the final product was very similar, significantly different manufacturing techniques were used in the creation of the Model 1835, and a great deal of emphasis was placed on parts interchangeability. This paved the way for the Springfield Model 1842 which was the first musket to be constructed of all interchangeable parts.

Production of the Pomeroy contract muskets was limited to around 7,000 units. Most Model 1835 muskets had their flintlocks converted to percussion locks during the 1840s and 1850s as it was more reliable and weather resistant. Some of the Model 1835 muskets also had their barrels rifled during this same period to fire the newly conical designed Minié ball, including experiment Burton-type, if the barrel was deemed thick enough to be structurally sound. However, the greatly increased breech pressure created by the new expanding round was too strong for the conversion process and older musket barrels to withstand and rifled Model 1835 muskets were issued standard .69 caliber round balls instead. While the precise quantity of U.S. M-1835/40 muskets that were rifled, sighted, and delivered to the Commonwealth of Virginia remains unverified, their procurement is well-documented, as is the fact that by the close of 1860, Virginia had already secured its full service for 1861 and a portion of its subsequent allotment for upcoming conflict.

The Springfield Model 1835 was not utilized during the Second Seminole War, as the Model 1816 (Type I), Model 1821/22 (Type II), and Model 1828/30 (Type III) remained widely available. Conversely, the M1839 cavalry Musketoon saw active service.

The Model 1835 was used in the Mexican–American War. The Model 1835 was also used by both the Union and the Confederates during the American Civil War.

== See also ==
- Springfield musket
- M1835 Kavallerie-Stutzen

| Preceded by Springfield Model 1822 | United States military musket 1835-1840 | Succeeded by Springfield Model 1840 |
