= Springfield Model 1847 =

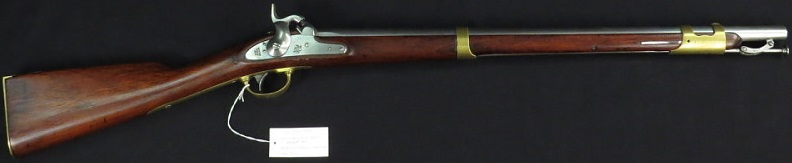
- Type: Musketoon
- Place of origin: United States

Service history
- Used by: United States; Confederate States
- Wars: American Indian Wars; Mexican–American War; American Civil War

Production history
- Designed: 1847
- Manufacturer: Springfield Armory
- No. built: c. 10,000

Specifications
- Mass: 7.4 lb (3.4 kg)
- Length: 41 in (1,000 mm)
- Barrel length: 26 in (660 mm)
- Cartridge: Paper cartridge, buck and ball/musket ball (.65/16.510 mm) undersized to reduce the effects of powder fouling
- Caliber: .69 in (17.526 mm)
- Action: Percussion lock
- Rate of fire: User dependent; usually 2 to 3 rounds per minute
- Muzzle velocity: 1,000 ft/s (300 m/s) to 1,400 ft/s (430 m/s)
- Effective firing range: 25 to 50 yd (23 to 46 m)
- Maximum firing range: 75 to 150 yd (69 to 137 m)
- Feed system: Muzzle-loaded
- Sights: A front sight cast into the upper barrel band, M1858 3-leaf rear sights (modified)

The Springfield Model 1847 was a percussion lock musketoon produced by the Springfield Armory in the mid-19th century.

== History ==
Muskets were designed for a dual purpose on the battlefield. They could be used as a ranged weapon, and they could also be used as a pike for short range fighting. Because they were used in a manner similar to a pike, muskets had to be long and heavy, which made them impractical for other uses. Because of this, many muskets were produced in a shorter version, often called a carbine or a musketoon. These shorter weapons were often used by naval forces and cavalry.

The Model 1847 musketoon was a shortened version of the Springfield Model 1842 standard infantry musket. Three basic models were produced at Springfield between 1847 and 1859. The total production of all three models is estimated at approximately 10,000 carbines.

The cavalry model was not highly regarded by those mounted troops to whom they were issued. Inspector General Joseph K. Mansfield conducted a tour of the Western outposts in 1853 and reported that the troops made many derogatory comments about their carbines. Dragoons told him that when the weapon was carried by a mounted trooper, the round ball would simply roll out of the weapon's barrel. His report also stated that "There is no probable certainty of hitting the object aimed at, and the recoil is too great to be fired with ease." Mansfield concluded that the gun was essentially "a worthless arm," having "no advocates that I am aware of."

The Model 1847 musketoon's inadequacies were largely responsible for Edward Steptoe's loss at the Battle of Pine Creek (along with other poor equipment selections).

At beginning of U.S Civil War, Additional Model 1847 cavalry carbines were procured by Delaware Kemper of Alexandria, Virginia. Kemper established the Alexandria Light Artillery in March 1861, serving as captain during the First Battle of Bull Run (First Manassas). This unit subsequently integrated into the 18th Battalion of Virginia Heavy Artillery, following Kemper's promotion to major. Despite concerted efforts to decommission the Model 1847 Cavalry Musketoon from U.S. military service, ordnance reports from December 31, 1862, indicate that 947 units remained in active field service. They were especially valued by Confederate cavalry, who were chronically short of supplies and proper arms, and were used alongside the 1856 Tower Musketoon, a Richmond-made pattern. Captured from federal arsenals and depots at the war's outset when many frontier garrisons surrendered their weapons, they appeared in cavalry skirmishes during the Peninsula Campaign of 1862, suited to the close-range needs of mounted troops. Steven W. Knott's monograph covers Confederate reissued firearms, including small arms of all types captured and collected, such as carbines and musketoons.

== Design and Features ==
The Model 1847, like the Model 1842 musket that it was based on, had a .69 caliber barrel, and was fired using a percussion lock system which was much more reliable and weather resistant than the previous flintlocks. The barrel was much shorter, only 26 inches (66 cm) in length compared to 42 inches (110 cm) of the Model 1842. The Model 1842 had been produced as a smoothbore musket, but many were later rifled to fire the new Minié ball. While older converted muskets could not handle the increased breech pressure caused by the new expanding bullet, the Model 1842 and Model 1847 performed adequately.

The Sappers & Miners Musketoon utilized a substantial brass-handled saber bayonet derived from the U.S. Model 1832 Foot Artillery Sword, while the Artillery Musketoon was equipped with the standard socket bayonet that used on U.S. Model 1835 and 1842 musket.

The Model 1847 carbines were also produced as a smoothbore weapon, and a small number of these also were later rifled. Smoothbore carbines were not sighted. The carbines that were rifled were also fitted with sights.

Like the Model 1842 musket, the Model 1847 carbine used barrel bands to attach the barrel to the stock. The carbine, being much shorter, only required two barrel bands, instead of the three required for the longer Model 1842 musket.

The Model 1847 carbine featured a small lock and chain or metal bale for attaching the ramrod which was especially useful while reloading on horseback.

The total weight of the carbine was approximately 7.4 pounds (3.4 kg), and its overall length was 41 inches (100 cm).

== Variants ==
The Model 1847 musketoon was produced in three variants, called the artillery, cavalry, and sappers (engineers) models. The artillery type produced 3,359 units.

The Springfield Model 1847 cavalry musketoon stands as the sole musket variant modified to incorporate the Merrill breech-loading system.

== See also ==
- Springfield musket
- M1839 Dragoon Musketoon
