= Springfield Model 1861 =

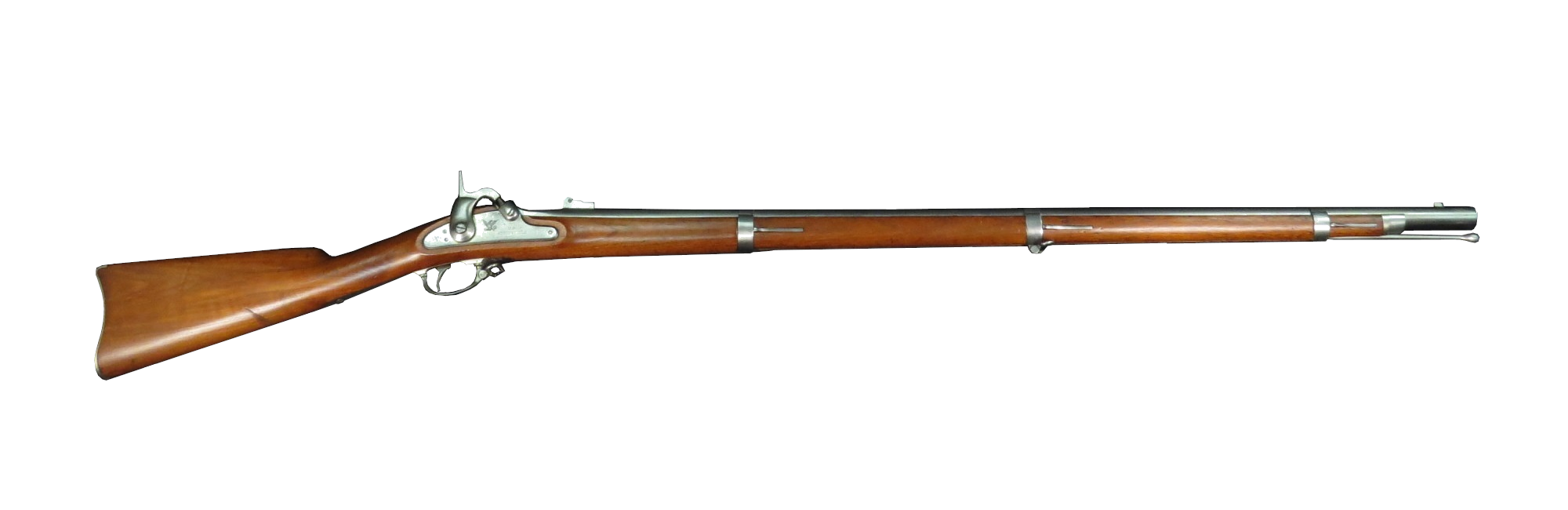
- Type: Rifled musket
- Place of origin: United States

Service history
- In service: 1861–1865
- Used by: United States; Confederate States; Brazil; Argentina; Japan; Fenian Brotherhood; Canada (captured); Cuban revolutionaries; China
- Wars: American Civil War; American Indian Wars; Paraguayan War; Fenian Raids; Boshin War; Ten Years' War; Nian Rebellion; 1871 U.S expedition in Joseon

Production history
- Designer: United States Army Ordnance Department
- Designed: 1861
- Manufacturer: Springfield Armory; Colt's Patent Firearms Manufacturing Company; Providence Tool Company; Amoskeag Manufacturing Company; Eagle Manufacturing Company; Lamson, Goodnow & Yale; Alfred Jenkins & Sons; Starr Arms Company; Various private contractors
- Unit cost: $14.93 (1861)
- Produced: 1861–1865
- No. built: c. 1,000,000
- Variants: "Colt Special"

Specifications
- Mass: 9 lb (4.1 kg)
- Length: 56 in (1,400 mm)
- Barrel length: 40 in (1,000 mm)
- Cartridge: Paper cartridge, Minié ball undersized to reduce the effects of powder fouling and for the skirt to grip the grooves when firing
- Caliber: .58 (14.7320 mm)
- Action: Percussion lock
- Rate of fire: User dependent; usually 2 to 3 rounds per minute
- Muzzle velocity: 1,000 ft/s (300 m/s) to 1,400 ft/s (430 m/s)
- Effective firing range: 200 to 400 yd (180 to 370 m)
- Maximum firing range: 800 to 1,000 yd (730 to 910 m)
- Feed system: Muzzle-loaded
- Sights: Open sights

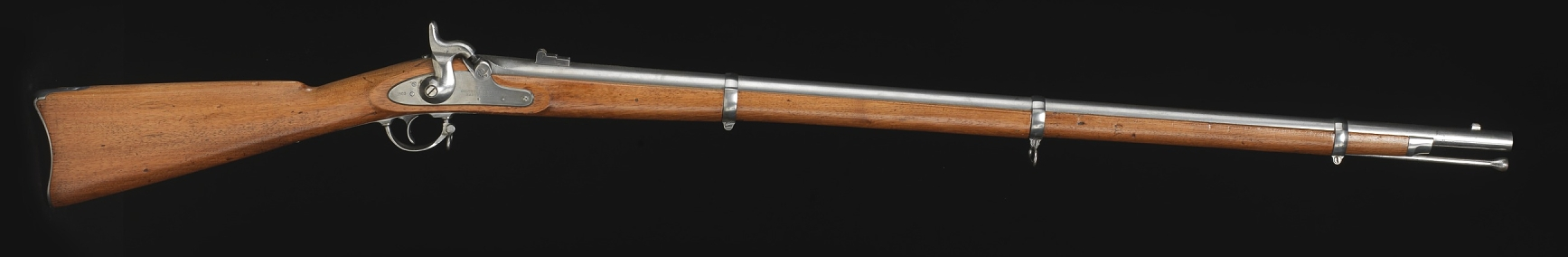
Springfield Model 1861 "Colt Special" rifled musket

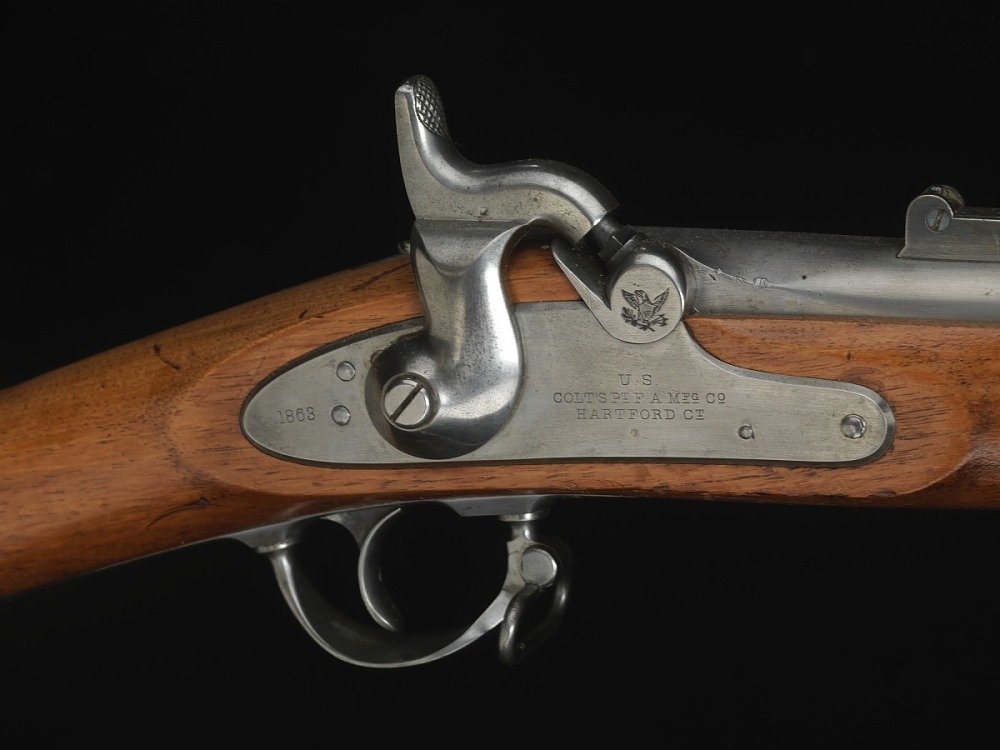
Colt Model 1861 Special Musket

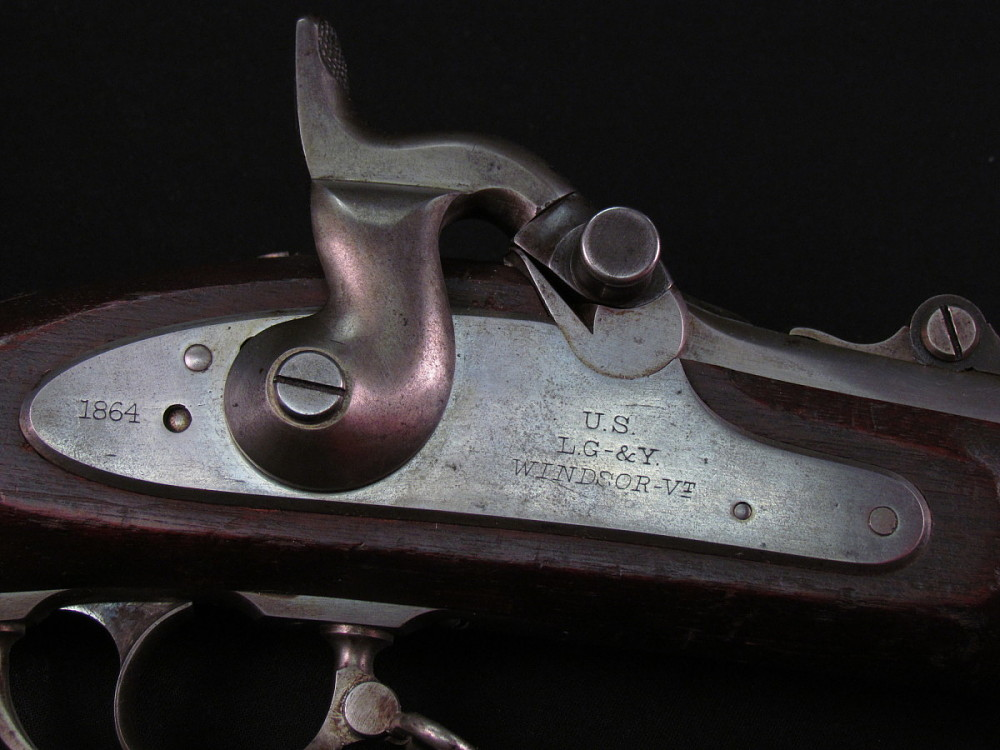
Lamson, Goodnow & Yale (L.G & Y.), Springfield Model 1861, built 1864

The Springfield Model 1861 was a Minié-type rifled musket used by the United States Army during the American Civil War, also referred as the War Between the States. Commonly referred to as the "Springfield" (after its original place of production, Springfield, Massachusetts), it was the most widely used Union Army shoulder weapon during the Civil War, favored for its range, accuracy, and reliability.

== Overview ==
The barrel was 41 inches (100 cm) long, firing a .58 caliber Minié ball, and the total weight was approximately 9 pounds (4.1 kg). The Model 1861 had a general effective range of 200 to 400 yards (180–370 m) but could reliably hit man-sized targets out to 500 yards (460 m) when used by marksmen, and used percussion caps which were much more reliable and weather resistant to fire (rather than the flintlocks of the 18th century; the last U.S. flintlock musket was the Springfield Model 1840). Well-trained troops were able to fire at a rate of three aimed shots per minute while maintaining accuracy up to 500 yards (460 m), though firing distances in the war were often much shorter.

The most notable difference between the Model 1861 and the earlier Springfield Model 1855 was the elimination of the Maynard tape primer for the Model 1861 (the Maynard primer, a self-feeding primer system, was unreliable in damp conditions, and the priming mechanism was expensive and time-consuming to produce). Further, unlike the Model 1855, the Model 1861 was never produced in a two-banded rifle configuration.

The Model 1861 was aimed using flip-up leaf sights. The sight had two leaves, one for 300 yards (270 m) and the other for 500 yards (460 m), and with both leaves down, the sight was set for a range of 100 yards (91 m). By contrast, the British Enfield Pattern 1853, favored by the Confederate military, utilized a ladder-sight system with 100-yard (91 m) increments, using steps from 100 to 400 yards (91–366 m) and a flip-up ladder for ranges beyond 500 yards (460 m). While the Enfield's sights did allow more precise sighting, the simple flip-up leaves found on the Model 1861 were more rugged and were less expensive to produce. The Enfield's sights also extended to 900 yards (820 m) (and further, on later models), compared to the 500-yard (460 m) maximum range of the Model 1861's sights, but for the average infantryman hitting anything beyond 600 yards (550 m) with either weapon was mostly a matter of luck. While the sight designs were very different, the two weapons were otherwise very similar, and had very similar effective ranges.

The Model 1861 cost around $15 each at the Springfield Armory where they were officially made.

Overwhelmed by the demand, the armory opened its weapons patterns up to twenty independent contractors. The most notable producer of contract Model 1861 rifled muskets was Colt, who made several minor design changes in their version, the "Colt Special" rifled musket. These changes included redesigned barrel bands, a new hammer, and a redesigned bolster. Several of these changes were eventually adopted by the United States Army Ordnance Department and incorporated into its successor, the Springfield Model 1863 which was a slightly improved version of the Model 1861.

== History ==
The Model 1861 was relatively scarce in the early years of the Civil War (many troops were still using Springfield Model 1842 smoothbore muskets and Springfield Model 1816 flintlock muskets converted to percussion cap primers due to better reliability and weather resistance, both in .69 caliber). It is unlikely that any of these were available for use in the First Battle of Bull Run. However, over time, more and more regiments began receiving Model 1861 rifled muskets, though this upgrade appeared somewhat quicker in the Eastern Theater of Operations. Over 1,000,000 Model 1861 rifled muskets were produced, with the Springfield Armory increasing its production during the war by contracting out to twenty other firms in the Union.

William Hahn served as the New York importer responsible for bringing approximately less than 500 German-handmade M1861 Springfield to the United States; these rare firearms, likely produced by Prussian dealer Christian Funk in Saxonian city of Suhl, were delivered to the U.S. Ordnance Department in two lots in 1862.

The number of Model 1861 rifled muskets produced by the Springfield Armory was 265,129 between January 1, 1861 and December 31, 1863. The Confederate armory produced a standard essentially of the Springfield Model 61.

The Model 1861 was a step forward in U.S. small arms design, being the first rifled shoulder weapon adopted and widely issued as the primary infantry weapon (earlier U.S. martial rifles such as the Harpers Ferry Model 1803 rifle were issued to riflemen rather than the infantry as a whole and production and issuance of the Model 1855 prior to the war had been limited by comparison to the Model 1861). However, some argue that its impact on the Civil War has been overstated. While more accurate in the hands of an experienced marksman, the rifled musket's accuracy was often lost in the hands of recruits who received only limited marksmanship training (the emphasis was on rate of fire). Further, most Civil War firefights were waged at a relatively close range using massed-fire tactics, minimizing the effect of the new rifled musket's long-range accuracy. Lastly, the .58 caliber bullet, when fired, followed a high parabolic trajectory. As a result, many inexperienced soldiers who did not adjust their sights would shoot over their enemies' heads in combat. There are numerous accounts of this happening in the war's earlier battles. With this in mind, soldiers were often instructed to aim low. Due to the width of the front sight on the Model 1861 Special the only bayonet that would fit was the Collins manufactured bayonet.

Subsequently, the Springfield musket was liquidated as surplus assets in Argentina. During the late stage of the war, Argentinian army also procured approximately 8,000 M1861 rifled muskets.

The U.S. rifled musket, which can retrofit Minié-type Pritchett ammunition, among various other firearms, was imported into Japan. The Chu Army operated as an independent force distinct from the Xiang Army; organized by Zuo Zongtang, it participated in the Dungan Revolt and subsequent other campaigns, utilizing the Model 1861 rifle.

The Springfield-pattern Bridesburg Model 1861 was a high-volume private-contract Civil War musket that was later sold as surplus and widely purchased by Canadian border militia units and by the Fenian Brotherhood, a 19th-century armed nationalist group responsible for attempted incursion.

The 1871 Shinmiyangyo expedition was conducted by the U.S Navy as involved marines and sailors. These troops were armed with contemporary military firearms, such as the Model 1870 Rolling Block Rifle (a breech-loader) or earlier breech-loading carbines, thus continues deploy obsolete muzzle-loading Springfield Model 1861. The M1861 percussion musket continued to see service within military posts and civilian militias in Red Cloud's War. With the introduction of modern brass ammunition after the war, the Model 1861 served as the starting point for several breechloaders, most of which were Allin converted Model 1861 and Model 1863 rifled muskets, culminating in the Springfield Model 1873 and its successors which would serve through the Indian Wars and all U.S. military actions in the Wild West until the end of the 19th century.

== Modern usage ==
The Model 1861 is very popular today among Civil War reenactors and collectors alike for its accuracy, reliability and historical background. Original antique Springfields are expensive, so companies such as Davide Pedersoli & C., Chiappa Firearms (Armi Sport) and Euro Arms make modern reproductions at much more affordable prices.

== See also ==
- Springfield rifle
- Springfield musket

Preceded by Springfield Model 1855	United States military rifle 1861–1863	Succeeded by Springfield Model 1863
