= Model 1816 Musket =

Springfield Model 1816
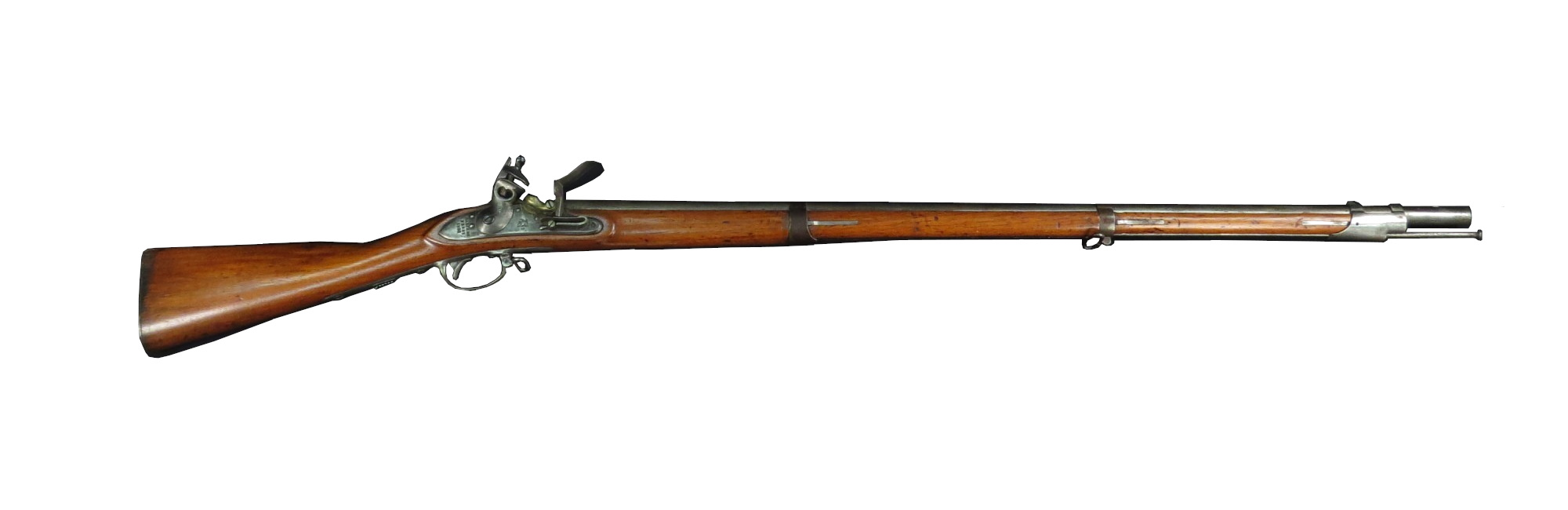
- Type: Musket
- Place of origin: United States

Service history
- In service: 1816–1865
- Used by: United States; Texas; State of Deseret; Confederate States
- Wars: American Indian Wars; Anti-piracy in Caribbean; Florida War; Woll Expedition; Mexican–American War; Utah War; American Civil War

Production history
- Designer: Eli Whitney
- Designed: 1816
- Manufacturer: Springfield Armory; Harpers Ferry Armory; Various private contractors
- Produced: 1816–1844; Type I: 1816–1822; Type II: 1822–1835; Type III: 1835–1844
- No. built: c. 700,000
- Variants: Percussion, rifled musket (conversions)

Specifications
- Mass: 10 lb (4.5 kg)
- Length: 58.0 in (1,470 mm)
- Barrel length: 42.0 in (1,070 mm)
- Cartridge: Paper cartridge, buck and ball/musket ball (.65/16.510 mm) undersized to reduce the effects of powder fouling
- Caliber: .69 in (17.526 mm)
- Action: Flintlock/percussion lock (conversion)
- Rate of fire: User dependent; usually 2 to 3 rounds per minute
- Muzzle velocity: 1,000 ft/s (300 m/s) to 1,400 ft/s (430 m/s)
- Effective firing range: 50 to 100 yd (46 to 91 m) (smoothbore); 200 to 400 yd (180 to 370 m) (rifled)
- Maximum firing range: 150 to 300 yd (140 to 270 m) (smoothbore); 800 to 1,000 yd (730 to 910 m) (rifled)
- Feed system: Muzzle-loaded
- Sights: A front sight cast into the upper barrel band, rear sight (percussion/rifled conversion)

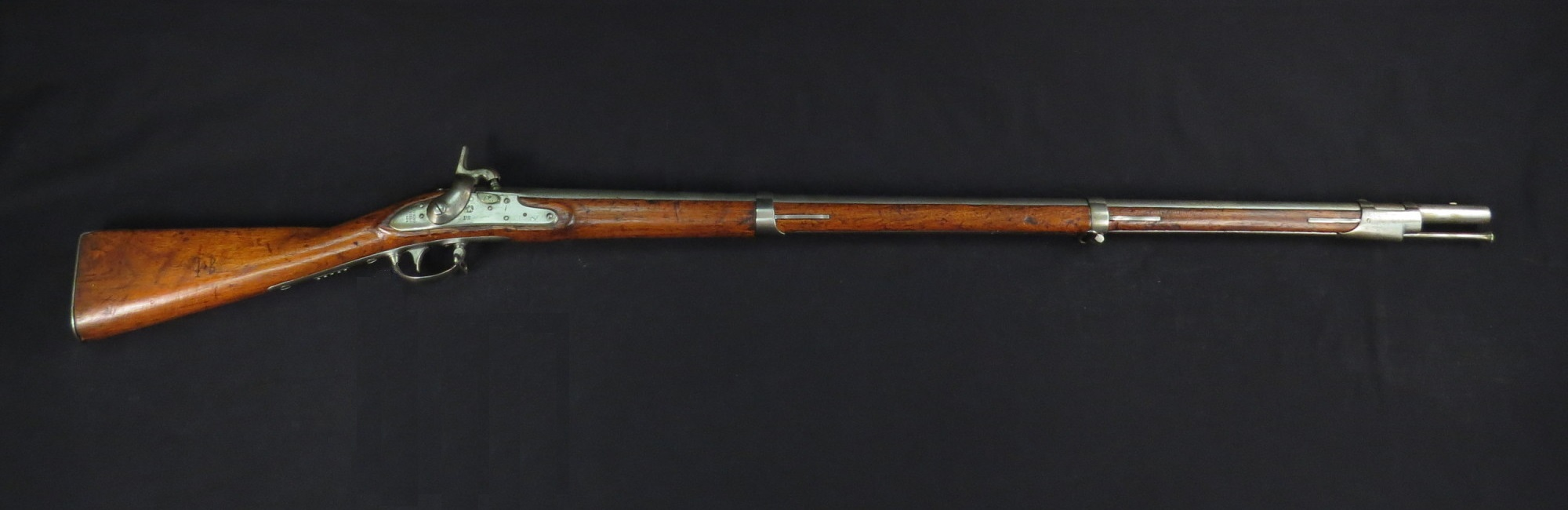
Springfield Model 1816 percussion conversion

The Springfield Model 1816 was a .69 caliber flintlock musket manufactured in the United States during the early to mid-19th century.

== History ==
The War of 1812 had revealed many weaknesses in American muskets. The Springfield Model 1812 was created in an attempt to improve both the design and manufacture of the musket. The Model 1816 made further improvements, and replaced the Model 1812. The Model 1812 had borrowed heavily from the design of the French Charleville Model 1777, and this design was retained for the Model 1816. The Model 1816 had a 42-inch (110 cm) long .69 caliber smoothbore barrel, similar to the Model 1812, but had a longer lockplate, a shorter trigger guard, and a longer bayonet than the Model 1812. The Model 1816 also had a more straight lined stock. The overall length of the weapon was 58 inches (150 cm).

The Model 1816 musket was originally manufactured at the Springfield and Harpers Ferry armories along with independent contractors between 1816 and 1844. Around 700,000 were made, more than any other flintlock in U.S. history.

The Model 1816 musket bayonet featured a 19-inch total length, inclusive of a 3-inch socket equipped with a T-shaped mortise slot for integration with the Model 1816 musket. The blades typically measured between 16 and 16¼ inches and were characterized by an angular design, incorporating a short fuller and hollow-ground back flutes. Production was distributed among the Springfield and Harpers Ferry Armories, alongside various private contractors. Items were standardly marked with "US" to denote government property, accompanied by the manufacturer’s or forger’s initials, such as "US EB" or "US K." The socket often displayed alphanumeric sequences near the mortise slot, indicating production batches, inspector approvals, or serial coordination with specific muskets. Additionally, select bayonets exhibit specific markings or symbols, such as "U," "JM," or "TA," which served to identify the inspector or subcontractor responsible for quality verification on Types I, II, and III.

The Model 1816 was originally manufactured as a flintlock musket. Like other flintlock muskets, many were later converted to percussion lock, as the percussion cap system was much more reliable and weather resistant. Some also had their barrels rifled later as well to fire the newly created Minié ball, if the barrel was thick enough to be structurally sound. However, the increased breech pressure generated by the new expanding projectile was too powerful for the conversion process and older musket barrels to hold and rifled Model 1816 muskets were instead issued standard .69 caliber round balls. The Lemuel Pomeroy musket is one with a long service life that overlapped directly with the period in which the United States embraced Manifest Destiny, the belief that the nation was destined to expand westward to the Pacific.

The Model 1816 musket was used by Texans during the Texas Revolution, which subsequently became standard issue for the Texan military in 1839, and by the U.S. Army and militia during the Mexican–American War. During this conflict, the flintlock version of the Model 1816 was preferred by U.S. regular forces, due to percussion cap supply concerns.

The M1816 musket and its variant models were utilized during operations within the Florida peninsula.

Nauvoo Legion engaged in frontier skirmishes, conducting patrols and punitive expeditions using smoothbore muskets in Wakara's War. The unit primarily utilized guerrilla tactics, employing small arms such as percussion-converted Model 1816 muskets type III, against forces of the U.S. government during the Utah Campaign.

The Starr M1816 contract musket is a .69‑caliber U.S. Model 1816 flintlock musket produced under government contract by Nathan Starr Jr. between 1829–1840, with about 15,530 made. Imperial Russia has requested Colt made 50,000 rifled muskets of M1816 alteration during outbreak of Crimean War. However, the shipment for the order hasn't refilled.

In 1858, Model 1816/1822 Springfield models incorporated the Maynard tape primer system by Remington.

It was also used during the early years of the American Civil War, also known as the War Between the States, until around 1862. The large majority of Model 1816 muskets had been converted to percussion firing by 1860. Muskets made prior to 1821 were considered too outdated to be serviceable weapons and many were not converted. Most of them were in Confederate arsenals and a large number of Confederate forces for the first year of the Civil War had the misfortune of carrying flintlock muskets, some of which dated back to the War of 1812. The M1816 was the base later used for the Morse breech-loading system for the Confederacy.

Many improvements to the Model 1816 were made, producing the Springfield Model 1822, Springfield Model 1835, Springfield Model 1840, and Springfield Model 1842. U.S. Ordnance Department referred to these as different models, but in other U.S. government documents they are referred to as a continuation of the Model 1816 with the first model designated as the Type I, the Model 1822 as the Type II, and the Model 1835 as the Type III.

Modern histories are similarly inconsistent in the nomenclature of these weapons.

== See also ==
- Springfield musket

Preceded by Springfield Model 1812	United States military musket 1816–1822	Succeeded by Springfield Model 1822
