= Springfield musket =

American musket

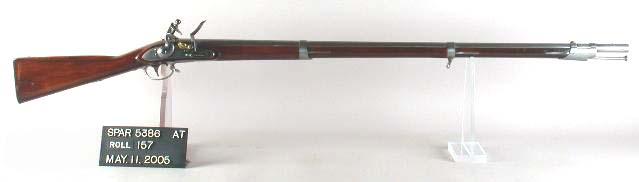
Springfield Model 1816 musket

Springfield musket may refer to any one of several types of small arms produced by the Springfield Armory in Springfield, Massachusetts, for the United States armed forces. In modern times, these muskets are commonly referred to by their date of design followed by the name Springfield ("1855 Springfield", for example). However, U.S. Ordnance Department documentation at the time did not use "Springfield" in the name ("Rifle Musket, Model 1855", for example).

They are sometimes incorrectly referred to as "Springfield rifles". Rifles have grooves on the inside of their barrels. Smoothbore muskets do not. The term "Rifled musket" originally referred to smoothbore muskets that later had their barrels rifled for Intended use of the Minié ball. This term was extended to include weapons that were produced with rifled barrels, as long as the overall design was very similar to the original smoothbore musket.

The Model 1842 Springfield is considered the first U.S. musket made using interchangeable-parts machinery.

Smoothbore musket:

- Springfield Model 1795 – .69 caliber flintlock smoothbore musket and first longarm to be manufactured at Springfield.
- Springfield Model 1812 – .69 caliber flintlock smoothbore musket.
- Springfield Model 1816 – .69 caliber flintlock smoothbore musket.
- Springfield Model 1822 – .69 caliber flintlock smoothbore musket.
- Springfield Model 1835 – .69 caliber flintlock smoothbore musket.
- Springfield Model 1840 – .69 caliber flintlock smoothbore musket.
- Springfield Model 1842 – .69 caliber percussion lock smoothbore musket.
- Springfield Model 1847 – .69 caliber percussion lock smoothbore musketoon.

Rifled musket:

- Springfield Model 1855 – .58 caliber Maynard tape primer/percussion lock rifled musket.
- Springfield Model 1861 – .58 caliber percussion lock rifled musket.
- Springfield Model 1863 – .58 caliber percussion lock rifled musket.

== See also ==
- Springfield rifle
