= Springfield Model 1840 flintlock musket =

Springfield Model 1840
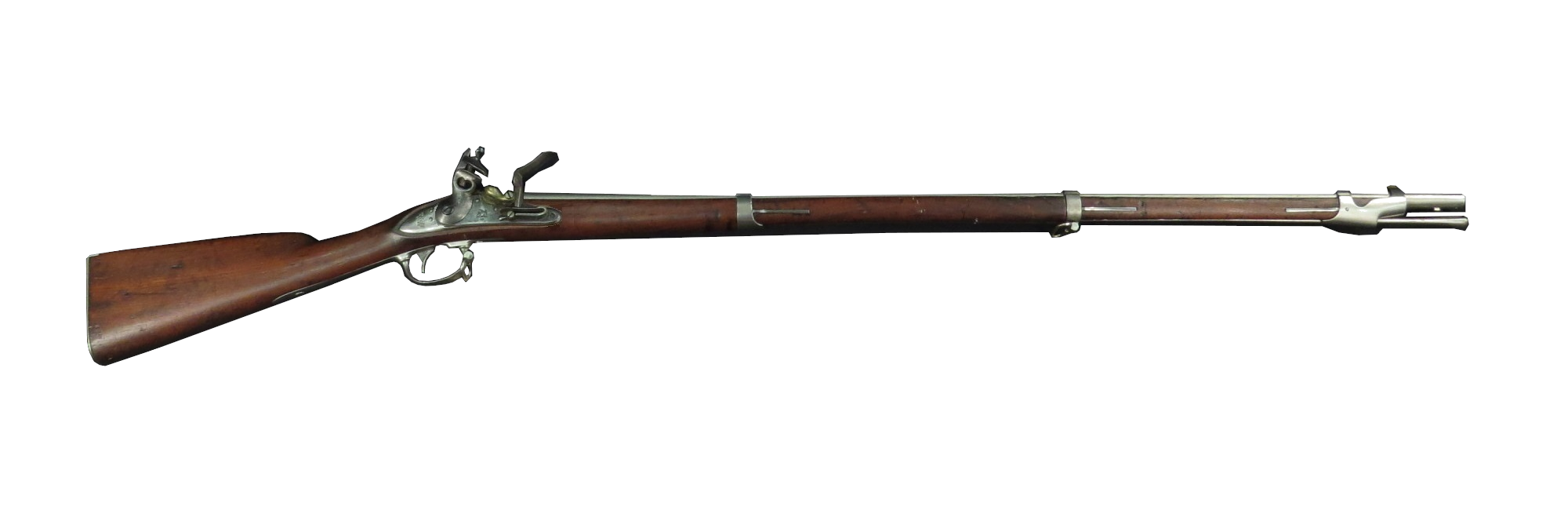
- Type: Musket
- Place of origin: United States

Service history
- In service: 1840–1865
- Used by: United States; Confederate States
- Wars: American Indian Wars; Florida War; Mexican–American War; American Civil War

Production history
- Designed: 1840
- Manufacturer: Springfield Armory; Harpers Ferry Armory; D. Nippes; L. Pomeroy
- Produced: 1840–1846
- No. built: c. 30,000

Specifications
- Mass: 9.8 lb (4.4 kg)
- Length: 58.0 in (1,470 mm)
- Barrel length: 42.0 in (1,070 mm)
- Cartridge: Paper cartridge, buck and ball/musket ball (.65/16.510 mm) undersized to reduce the effects of powder fouling
- Caliber: .69 in (17.526 mm)
- Action: Flintlock/percussion lock (conversion)
- Rate of fire: User dependent; usually 2 to 3 rounds per minute
- Muzzle velocity: 1,000 ft/s (300 m/s) to 1,400 ft/s (430 m/s)
- Effective firing range: 50 to 100 yd (46 to 91 m) (smoothbore); 200 to 400 yd (180 to 370 m) (rifled)
- Maximum firing range: 150 to 300 yd (140 to 270 m) (smoothbore); 800 to 1,000 yd (730 to 910 m) (rifled)
- Feed system: Muzzle-loaded
- Sights: A front sight cast into the upper barrel band, rear sight (percussion/rifled conversion)

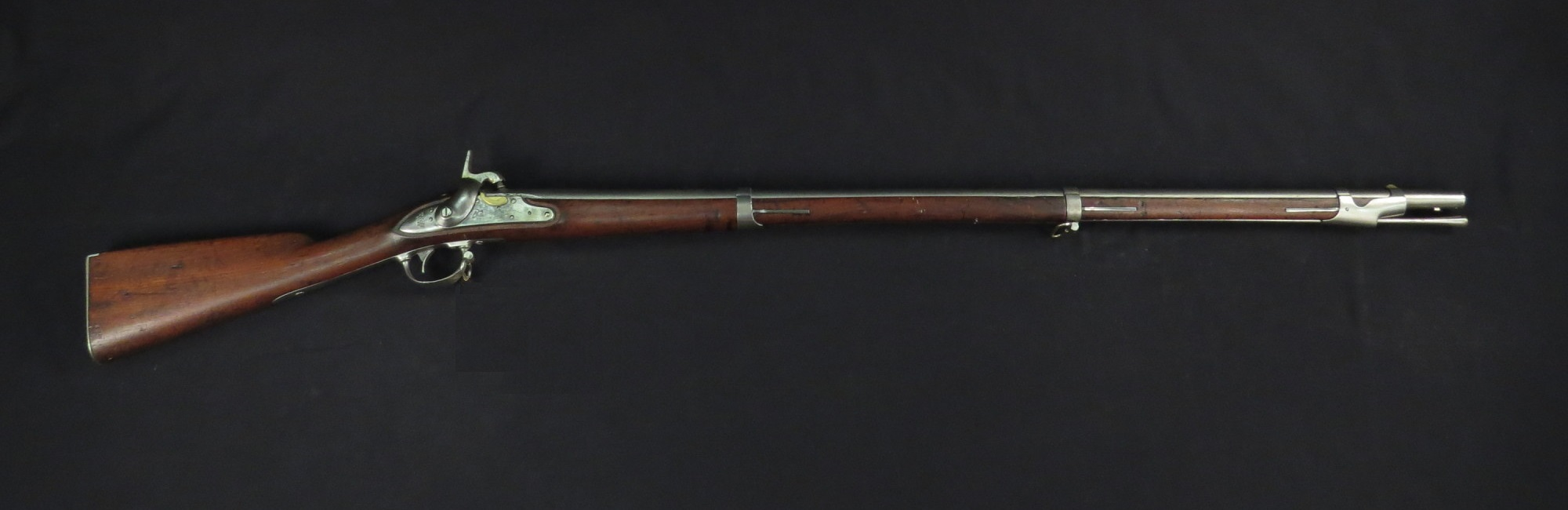
Springfield Model 1840 percussion conversion

The Springfield Model 1840 was a flintlock musket manufactured by the United States during the mid-19th century. The .69 caliber musket had a 42-inch (110 cm) barrel, an overall length of 58 inches (150 cm), and a weight of 10 pounds (4.5 kg). More than 30,000 were produced by the Springfield and Harpers Ferry armories and two independent contractors between 1840 and 1846 (D. Nippes and L. Pomeroy).

== History ==
The Model 1840 was a minor improvement over the Springfield Model 1835, and therefore was not dramatically different from the older musket. The Model 1840 featured a longer bayonet with a clasp and a stock with a comb. The designers of the Model 1840 anticipated that the musket would eventually be rifled, and made the barrel thicker than the earlier Model 1835 accordingly. The various modifications to the Model 1840 made it slightly heavier than the Model 1835. Like the M1835, The Springfield Model 1840 was directly based on the French Model 1822 Tabatière, but it did inherit its design lineage from earlier Kingdom of France's 1777 Charleville pattern muskets that shaped all U.S. .69‑caliber flintlocks.

The Model 1840 was the last flintlock musket produced at Springfield and Harpers Ferry armories. Many were converted to percussion lock due to better reliability and weather resistance before they made it to the field. Although produced as a smoothbore musket, most of the Model 1840 muskets had their barrels rifled later, as the designers had expected to fire the newly introduced Minié ball. However, despite having a thicker barrel, the increased breech pressure generated by the new expanding projectile was too great for the conversion process to hold and rifled Model 1840 muskets were rather issued standard .69 caliber round balls.

A U.S. Model 1840 was produced by Daniel Nippes of Mill Creek, Pennsylvania, in 1848 under two government contracts totaling 5,600 units. Nippes was subsequently awarded two contracts to convert 2,000 of these muskets to percussion ignition using the Maynard Tape Primer system. This conversion features a primer mechanism with a door inscribed "EDWARD MAYNARD/PATENTED/1816," which pivots downward and is secured by a center swivel catch. The lock plate bears the vertical stamp "MILL/CREEK/PA/1842" behind the hammer, while the barrel, featuring a muzzle-mounted bayonet lug, is stamped "U.S./JH/P."

Although largely considered obsolete by the Civil War, the M1840 musket saw limited deployment by Confederate forces, including specific units within the Army of Tennessee. Furthermore, some unaltered specimens were utilized by Union home guard units. Some experts suggest that the M1840 musket was involved in the tragic friendly fire incident that mortally wounded General Stonewall Jackson by 18th North Carolina Infantry of the Lane's Brigade. However, by the mid-war period, the Model 1840's smoothbore flintlock design was significantly outmoded when compared to gradually adopted contemporary rifled muskets such as the Springfield Model 1861/63 or imported Enfields/Musketoon (domestically represented by the Richmond Model 1862 in the Confederate States), with its effective close-range engagement limited to under 100 yards.

== See also ==
- Springfield musket

Preceded by Springfield Model 1835	United States military musket 1840-1842	Succeeded by Springfield Model 1842
