= Springfield Model 1842 =

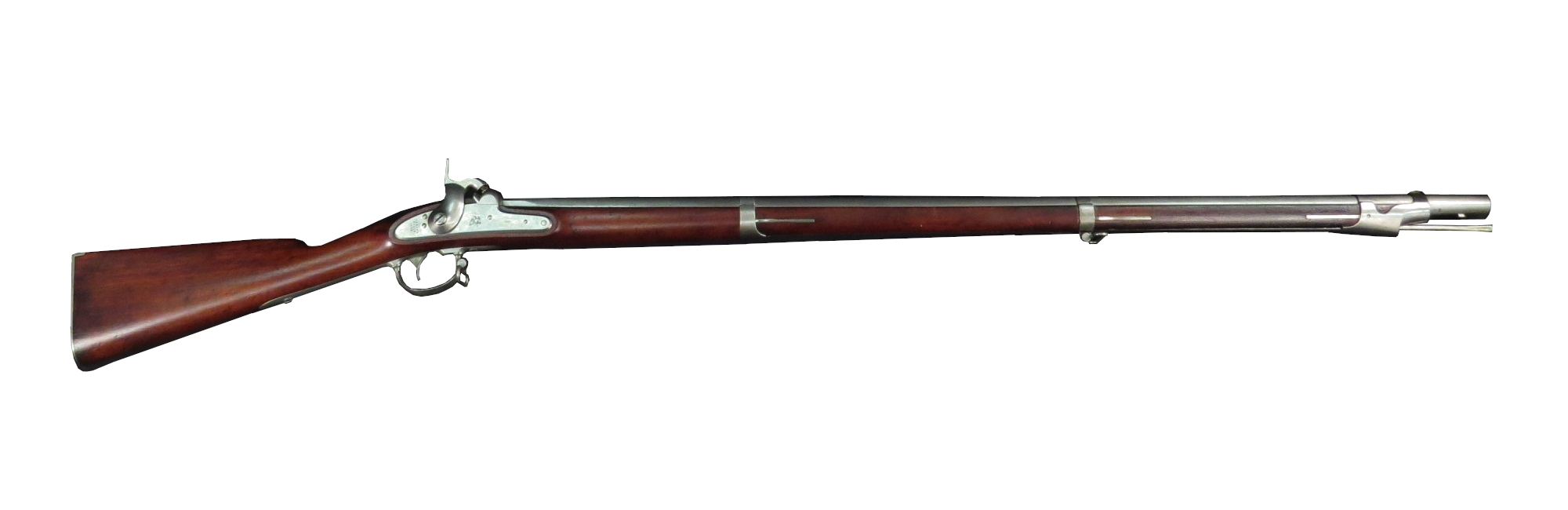
- Type: Musket
- Place of origin: United States

Service history
- In service: 1844–1865
- Used by: United States; Confederate States; Tokugawa Shogunate; China; Mexico
- Wars: American Indian Wars; Mexican–American War; Billy Bowlegs War; American Civil War; Boshin War; Caste War of Yucatán

Production history
- Designed: 1842
- Manufacturer: Springfield Armory; Harpers Ferry Armory; A.H. Waters; B. Flagg & Co. Palmetto Armory
- Produced: 1844–1855
- No. built: 275,000

Specifications
- Mass: 9.8 lbs (4.45 kg)
- Length: 58 in (1,473 mm)
- Barrel length: 42 in (1,067 mm)
- Cartridge: Paper cartridge, buck and ball/musket ball/Minié ball (rifled conversion) undersized (.65/16,510 mm) to reduce the effects of powder fouling
- Caliber: .69 in (17.526 mm)
- Action: Percussion lock
- Rate of fire: User dependent; usually 2 to 3 rounds per minute
- Muzzle velocity: 1,000 ft/s (300 m/s) to 1,400 ft/s (430 m/s)
- Effective firing range: 50 to 100 yd (46 to 91 m) (smoothbore); 200 to 400 yd (180 to 370 m) (rifled)
- Maximum firing range: 150 to 300 yd (140 to 270 m) (smoothbore); 800 to 1,000 yd (730 to 910 m) (rifled)
- Feed system: Muzzle-loaded
- Sights: A front sight cast into the upper barrel band, rear sight (rifled conversion)

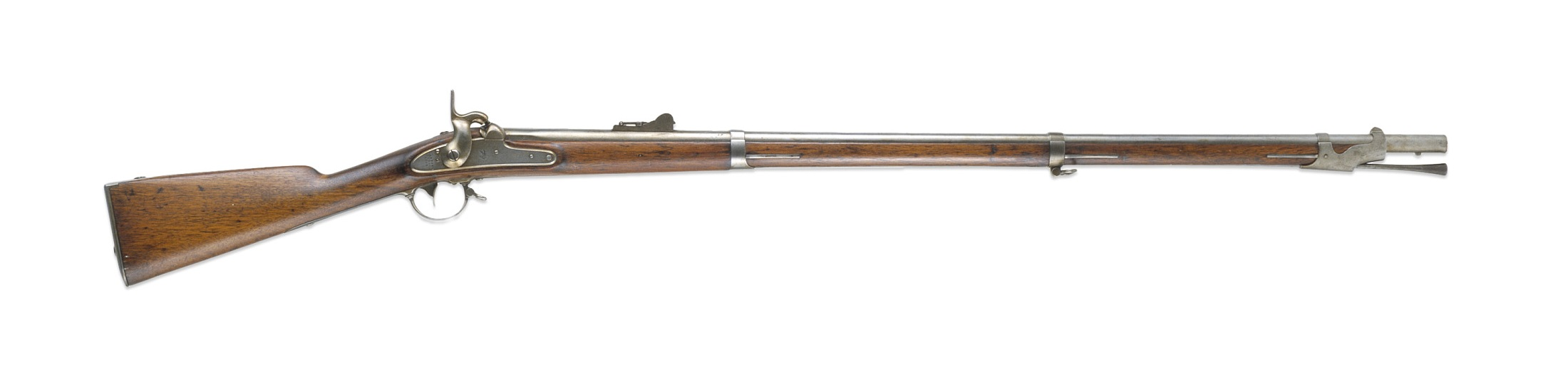
Springfield Model 1842 rifled conversion

The Springfield Model 1842 was a .69 caliber musket manufactured and used in the United States during the mid-19th century. It is a continuation of the Springfield Model 1816 line of muskets but is generally referred to as its own model number rather than just a variant of the Model 1816.

== Overview ==
The Model 1842 was the last U.S. smoothbore musket. Many features that had been retrofitted into the Springfield Model 1840 were standard on the Model 1842. The Model 1842 was the first primary U.S. musket to be produced with a percussion lock; however, most of the Model 1840 flintlocks ended up being converted to percussion locks before reaching the field as the percussion cap system was vastly superior to the flintlock being much more reliable and weather resistant.

Like all Model 1816 derivatives, the Model 1842 has a .69 caliber smoothbore barrel that was 42 inches (110 cm) in length. The Model 1842 had an overall length of 58 inches (150 cm) and a weight of 10 pounds (4.5 kg).

== History ==
A great emphasis was placed on manufacturing processes for the Model 1842. It was the first small arm produced in the U.S. with fully interchangeable (machine-made) parts. Approximately 275,000 Model 1842 muskets were manufactured at the Springfield and Harpers Ferry armories between 1842 and 1855.

Model 1842 muskets were also made by independent contractors. However, these were few in number. Some were made by A.H. Waters and B. Flagg & Co., both of Millbury, Massachusetts. These were distinguished by having brass furniture instead of iron. A.H. Waters went out of business due to a lack of contracts in New England, and Flagg entered into a partnership with William Glaze of South Carolina. They relocated the machinery to the Palmetto Armory in Columbia, South Carolina. Instead of "V" over "P" over the eagle's head, these guns were usually stamped "P" over "V" over the palmetto tree. Most of the output of the Palmetto Armory went to the state militia of South Carolina. There were only 6,020 Model 1842 type muskets produced on that contract and none were made there after 1853.

Polk’s administration successfully resolved the Oregon boundary dispute with Britain through diplomacy, establishing the 49th parallel as the U.S.-Canada border in the Oregon Territory. This removed the threat of a two-front conflict, allowing the U.S. to focus military resources on the conflict with Mexico. U.S. troops in the Mexican-American War were equipped using existing arsenals that included flintlock muskets and the newer M1842 percussion muskets, reflecting a transitional period in military technology. These arms were drawn from the stocks already on hand, underscoring the reliance on pre-war stockpiles rather than a fully modernized army. The Mexican-American War elicited differing levels of support across the United States. The M1842 was in service in many battles like Buena Vista and Chapultepec. The South and the Mississippi Valley showed strong enthusiasm, while the Northern view, by contrast, was skeptical. Southern politicians and citizens often viewed Northern Mexico, the Caribbean, and Central America as potential sites for expanding Southern power and maintaining the balance in the Senate, and Southern leaders covertly supported filibustering expeditions, unauthorized military ventures aimed at overthrowing foreign governments, such as those led by William Walker in Nicaragua and Narciso López in Cuba.

Like the earlier Model 1840, the Model 1842 was produced with an intentionally thicker barrel than necessary, with the assumption that it would likely be rifled later. As the designers anticipated, many of the Model 1842 muskets had their barrels rifled later so that they could fire the newly developed Minié ball. While older converted muskets could not withstand the increased breech pressure generated by the new expanding projectile, the Model 1842 performed well. Between 1855 and 1859, nearly 44,000 Model 1842 muskets of various manufacturers underwent rifling at five U.S. arsenals and armories, including Springfield, Harpers Ferry, Saint Louis, Frankford, and Benicia. The 23,683 rifled-and-sighted muskets remaining ~20,076 were rifled without rear sights. The rifling was three-groove, progressive-depth, with a twist of one turn in 72 inches, and ramrods were cupped to accept conical Minié-pattern ammunition.

Tests conducted by the U.S. Army showed that the .69 caliber musket was not as accurate as the smaller bore rifled muskets. Also, the Minié ball, being conical and longer than it was broad, had much more mass than a round ball of the same caliber. A smaller caliber Minié ball could be used to provide as much mass on target as the larger .69 caliber round ball. For these reasons, the Model 1842 was the last .69 caliber musket. The Army later standardized on the .58 caliber Minié ball, as used in the Springfield Model 1855, Springfield Model 1861, and Springfield Model 1863.

Both the original smoothbore version and the modified rifled version of the Model 1842 were used in the American Civil War. The smoothbore version was produced without sights (except for a cast one on the barrel band). When Model 1842 muskets were modified to have rifled barrels, sights were usually added at the same time as the rifling. C.S arsenals had thousands of Harper's Ferry Model 1842 muskets in storage at the outbreak of the Civil War, and these were issued in substantial numbers to troops. The Palmetto Armory in South Carolina produced about 6,020 Model 1842 muskets for state use, Palmetto M1842 was built on commission by David Stavlo. Total production unit is estimated at 9,000 to 10,000 muskets. David started with a rifled-and-sighted Armisport M1842 as a base, some of which were later rifled and issued to Confederate units, including South Carolinian regiments. 1,225 captured Model 1842 muskets were assembled in the Richmond armory.

The Model 1842 musket was effectively used during the American Civil War. This combination of formal muskets, supplemented by personal blades, reflected both the logistical constraints of the Confederate military and the versatile nature of these local volunteer units. The Louisiana Tigers thus represent an example of early-war Confederate infantry equipped with a mix of standard Model 1816 and older-era weaponry. The M1842 remained in use until the late summer of 1864. A significant number, totaling at least 25,000, were still being utilized by United States forces, and a similar or potentially larger quantity almost certainly remained in service with the Confederacy.

=== Post-Civil War import ===
Afterwards it was sold as surplus abroad to other countries such as China, Japan during the Boshin War, and Mexico during the 1870s for state militias such Yucatán marking as well as traveling west to the American frontier. Some were cut down into carbines or "pony guns" for cavalry and frontier used by state militias, and traded with or captured by Native American tribes in the Comancheria region of the Texas Panhandle.

== Variant ==
A musketoon variant, designated the Springfield Model 1847, was also produced.

Harpers Ferry have converting M1842 musket using Merrill Alteration.

== Reproduction ==
Dixie Gun Works has imported a modern reproduction of the Springfield Model 1842 since the mid-2000s, manufactured by Armi Sport/Chiappa of Italy, including models such as the Smoothbore (PR0817) and the Rifled (PR0828).

In the 1864 miniseries, the Danish and Prussian troops are armed with replica Springfield Model 1842 muskets with brass fittings. Neither side actually used those smoothbore muskets in the conflict, as they were both equipped with Minié-type rifles like the Danish Model 1848 Tapriffel and the Prussian Potsdam Model 1839/55.

== See also ==
- Augustin Infantry Model 1842 Musket, pattern musket of very similar design.
- Springfield musket

Preceded by Springfield Model 1840	United States military musket 1842–1855	Succeeded by Springfield Model 1855
