= Militia Act of 1808 =

United States Congress act

The Militia Act of 1808 (Pub. L. 10–52), formally "An act making provision for arming and equipping the whole body of the militia of the United States", enacted April 23, 1808, was legislation enacted by the 10th United States Congress that provided an annual appropriation of $200,000, to provide funding for arms and equipment for the various state militias.

== Provisions ==
That the annual sum of two hundred thousand dollars be, and the same hereby is appropriated, for the purpose of providing arms and military equipments for the whole body of the militia of the United States, either by purchase or manufacture, by and on account of the United States.

SEC. 2. And be it further enacted, That the President of the United States be, and be hereby is authorized, to purchase sites for, and erect such additional arsenals and manufactories of arms, as he may deem expedient, under the limitations and restrictions now provided by law: Provided also, that so much of any law as restricts the number of workmen in the armories of the United States to one hundred men, be, and the same hereby is repealed.

SEC. 3. And be it further enacted, That all the arms procured in virtue of this act, shall be transmitted to the several states composing this Union, and territories thereof, to each state and territory respectively, in proportion to the number of the effective militia in each state and territory, and by each state and territory to be distributed, to the militia in such state and territory, under such rules and regulations as shall be by law prescribed by the legislature of each state and territory.
