= Springfield Armory =

National Historic Site of the United States

- Springfield Armory National Historic Site
- U.S. National Register of Historic Places
- U.S. National Historic Landmark District
- U.S. National Historic Site
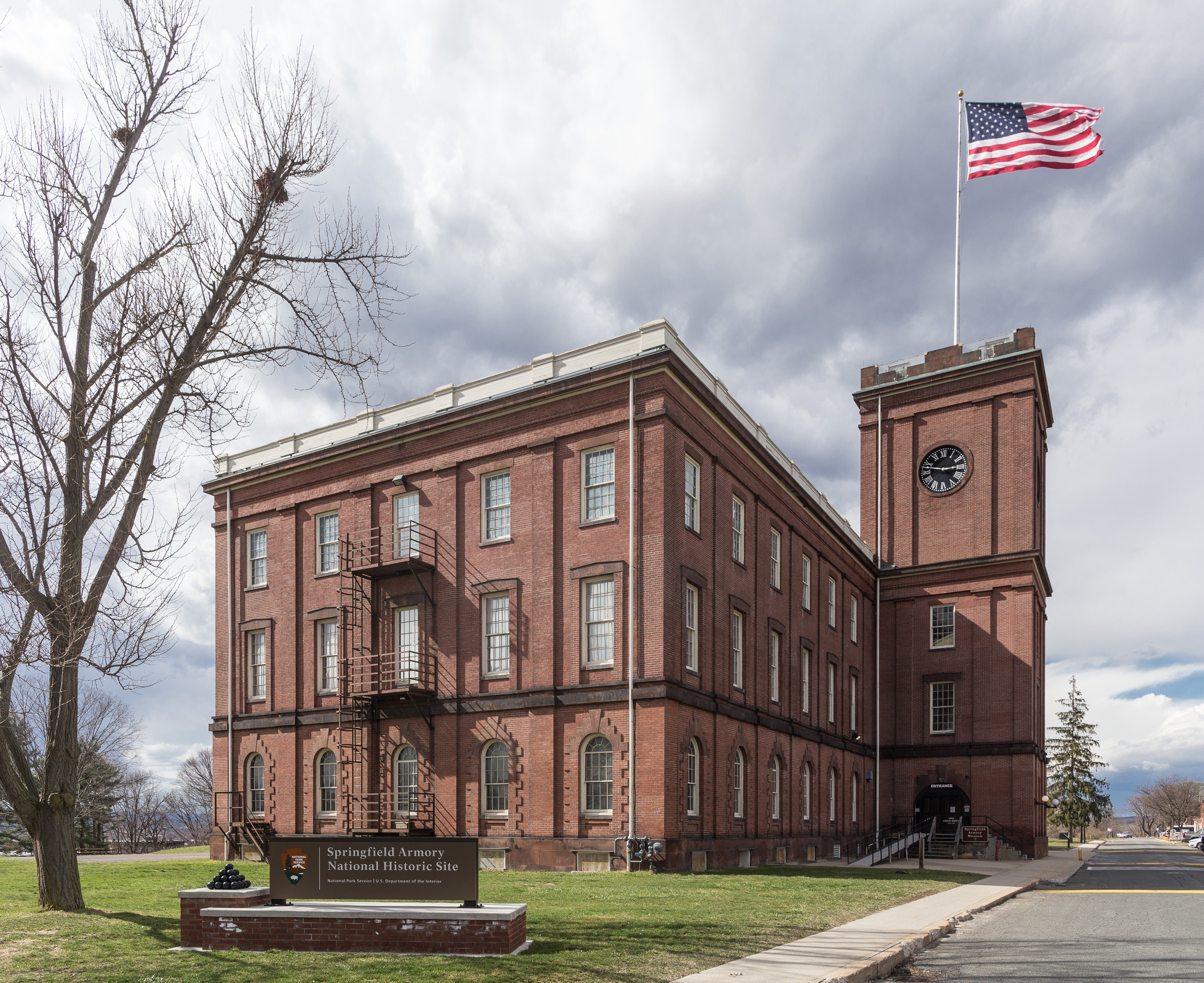
- The clocktower of the Main Arsenal building, built in 1847

- Location within Massachusetts Location within the United States
- Location: Armory Sq., Springfield, Massachusetts, United States
- Coordinates: 42°6′29″N 72°34′54″W
- Area: 54.93 acres (0.2223 km^{2})
- Built: 1778; 248 years ago
- Architectural style: Greek Revival
- Visitation: 13,934 (2025)
- Website: Springfield Armory National Historic Site
- NRHP reference No.: 66000898

Significant dates
- Added to NRHP: October 15, 1966
- Designated NHLD: December 19, 1960

The Springfield Armory, more formally known as the United States Armory and Arsenal at Springfield located in the city of Springfield, Massachusetts, was the primary center for the manufacture of United States military firearms from 1777 until its closing in 1968. It was the first federal armory and one of the first factories in the United States dedicated to the manufacture of weapons. The site is preserved as the Springfield Armory National Historic Site, Western Massachusetts' only unit of the national park system. It features the world's largest collection of historic American firearms.

Famous first as the United States' primary arsenal during the American Revolutionary War, and then as the scene of a confrontation during Shays' Rebellion, the Springfield Armory in the 19th and 20th centuries became the site of numerous technological innovations of global importance, including interchangeable parts, the assembly line style of mass production, and modern business practices, such as hourly wages. The facility would play a decisive role in the American Civil War, producing most of the weaponry used by Union troops which, in sum, outpaced Confederate firearm production by a ratio of 32 to 1. American historian Merritt Roe Smith has posited that advancements in machine manufacturing which allowed the facility to increase production capacity by more than 25 fold, from 9,601 rifles in 1860 to 276,200 in 1864, served as a precursor to the mass production of the Second Industrial Revolution and 20th century assembly line production. The numerous firearm models produced at the Springfield Armory from 1794 to 1968 are referred to as "Springfield muskets and rifles".

== Founding (1777) ==
Local and colonial militia used the bluff on which the Springfield Armory would become located during the 17th century for militia training, particularly after the Attack on Springfield during King Philip's War.

In 1777, during the American Revolutionary War, George Washington scouted and approved the site of the Springfield Armory, after it was referred to him by General Henry Knox, his artillery chief. Although a small town at the time, Springfield, Massachusetts, offered obvious geographical advantages—it lay at the intersection of three rivers (including the major Connecticut River), and four major roads headed toward New York City, Boston, Albany, and Montreal. Additionally, Springfield is located just north of the Connecticut River's first waterfall (Enfield Falls), which is too steep to be navigated by ocean-going vessels. Thus, Springfield was the first town on the Connecticut River protected from attack by seafaring naval vessels.

The Armory site itself sits atop a high bluff like a citadel, overlooking a wide stretch of the Connecticut River, at its confluence with the Westfield River. General Knox concurred with Washington that "the plain just above Springfield is perhaps one of the most proper spots on every account" for the location of an arsenal.

In 1777, patriot colonists established "The Arsenal at Springfield" to manufacture cartridges and gun carriages for the war effort. During the Revolution, the arsenal stored muskets, cannon, and other weapons. Patriots built barracks, shops, storehouses, and a magazine. Some doubt exists that the colonists manufactured arms during the Revolutionary War. After the war, the Army kept the facility to store arms for future needs. By the 1780s, the Springfield Arsenal functioned as a major ammunition and weapons arsenal.

Some time later, when manufacturing became important, the arsenal expanded to a second area south and west in Springfield, where water power was available. Around that time, the Mill River was dammed to form a mile-long lake called Watershops Pond. The main shops were behind the dam and a foundry was built below it. This factory was modernized, and the greater part of machining for Springfield and Garand rifles was conducted in it.

President George Washington appointed David Ames as first superintendent of the armory. His father Capt. John Ames was a blacksmith who had provided guns to the Colonial army.

== Shays' Rebellion (1787) ==
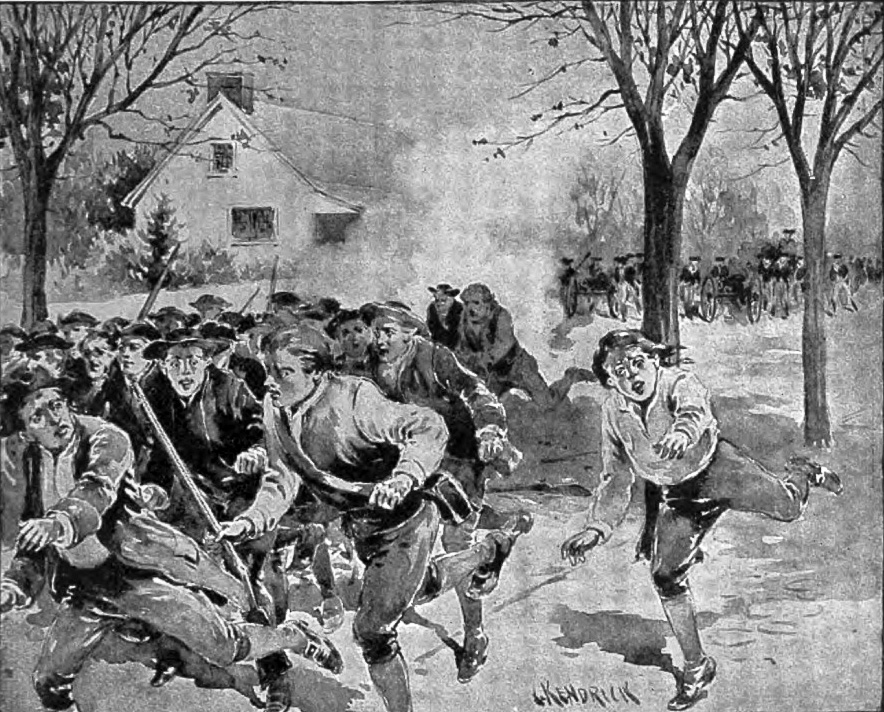
Shays' rebel forces, attempting to overtake the armory, flee from the state militia as grapeshot is fired from artillery

In 1786 and 1787, American Revolutionary War veteran Daniel Shays led an armed, populist uprising that attempted to overthrow the Government of Massachusetts. On January 25, 1787, thousands of Shays' Regulators marched on the Springfield Armory, hoping to seize its weaponry and force a change of government. That day the Springfield Armory was defended by state militia, who fired grapeshot at the rebels, forcing them to flee. This confrontation proved decisive, as Shays' Rebellion was crushed soon thereafter, and some of its participants tried for treason.

Shays' Rebellion directly influenced the delegates at the 1787 Constitutional Convention. Washington cited it as his reason for coming out of retirement. During the debates over the U.S. Constitution, in encouraging a stronger Federal government, James Madison cautioned the attendees that "the rebellion in Massachusetts is a warning, gentlemen."

== Production (1795–1968) ==
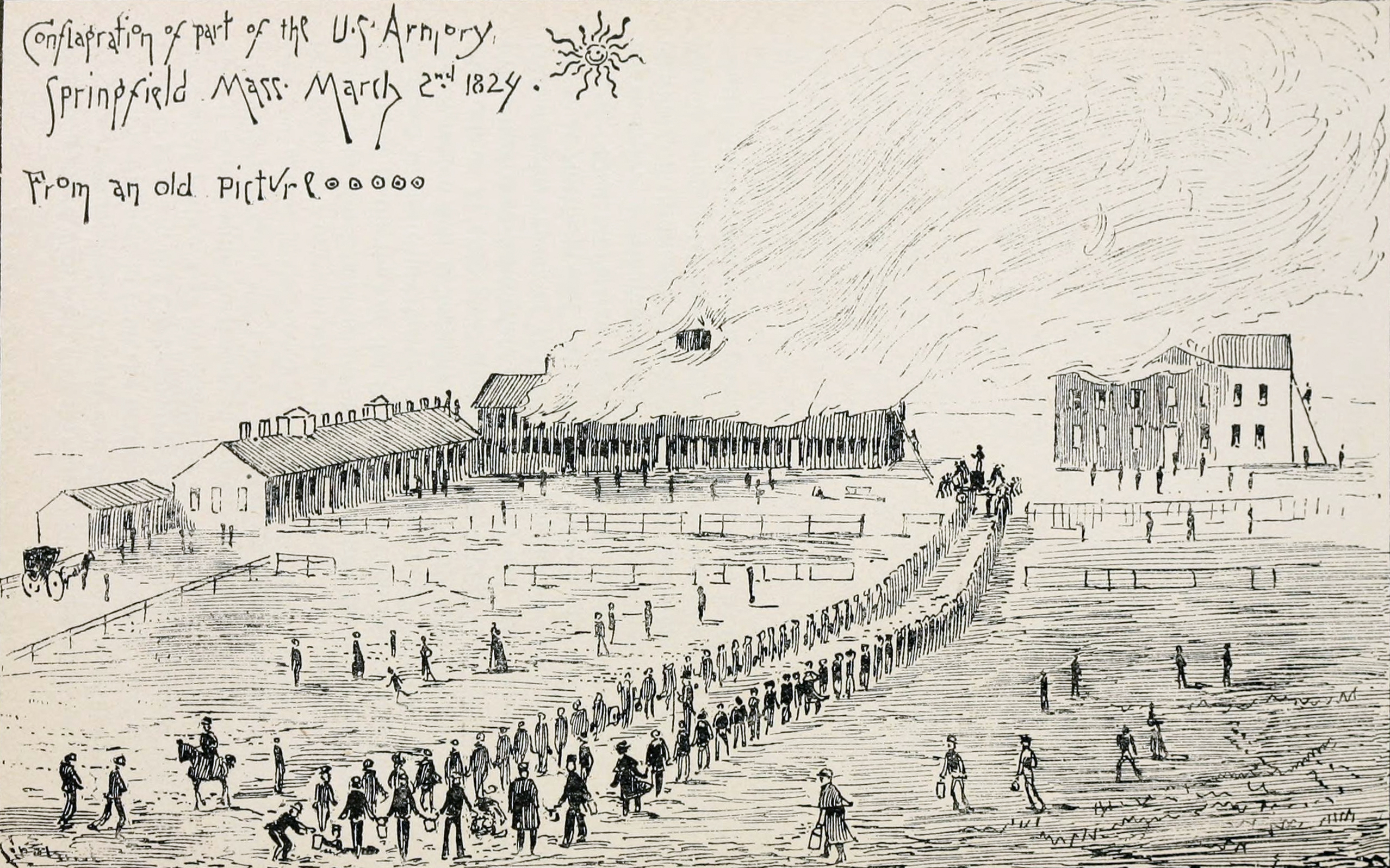
Conflagration of Part of the US Armory, Springfield, Mass. March 2nd, 1824

=== Early years ===
In 1793, the National Arsenal contained brass ordnance, howitzers, traveling carriages, shot strapt, canisters filled, quilted grape, iron shot, shells, powder, musket ball, cylinders, caps, paper cartridges, fuzes filled, muskets, swords, various military stores, and implements. In 1795, the Springfield Armory produced the new nation's first musket - the Model 1795 Musket which was largely patterned after the French Charleville musket which had armed the French army during the American Revolution.

=== Early 19th century ===
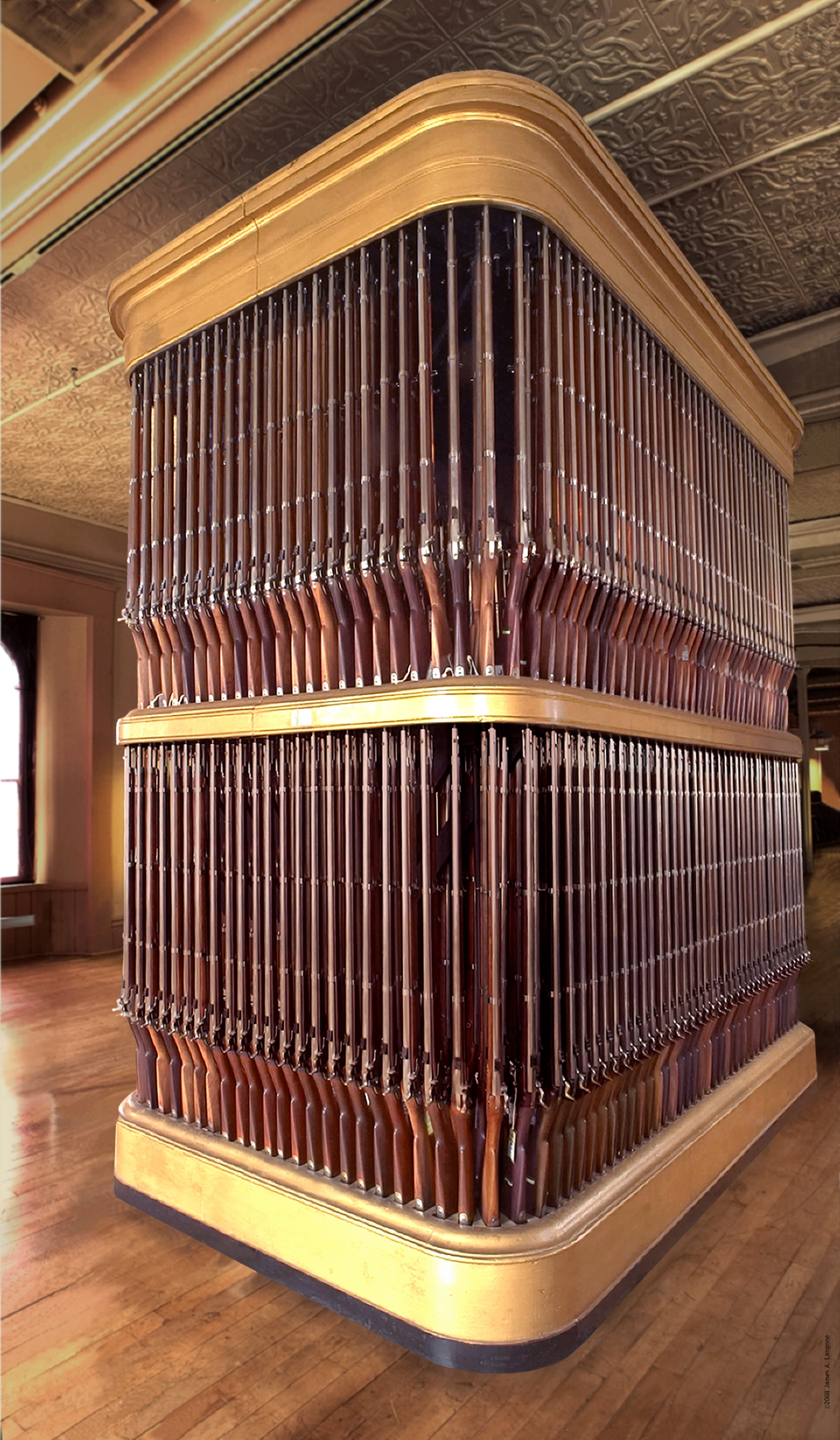
An "Organ of Muskets", in total the racks in the arsenal contain 647 Model 1861 rifles, with capacity to hold 1,100 when fully stocked; these racks are so-called "organs" as they were described as such in Henry Wadsworth Longfellow's lamentations against the wastes of war in his poem "The Arsenal at Springfield"

The Armory played a major role in providing weapons for the American Army during the War of 1812. Its monthly reports to the War Department are online, and they indicate it made 9588 new muskets in 1814 and repaired 5190 old ones that year. It several times reported that its funding had been delayed.

Fueled by the Springfield Armory, the City of Springfield quickly became a national center for invention and development. In 1819 Thomas Blanchard developed a special lathe for the consistent mass production of rifle stocks. Thomas Blanchard worked at Springfield Armory for 5 years. The lathe enabled an unskilled workman to quickly and easily turn out identical irregular shapes. The large drum turned two wheels: a friction wheel that followed the contours of the metal rifle pattern, and the cutting wheel that imitated the movements of the friction wheel to make an exact replica of the pattern in wood. In the 1840s the old flintlock gave way to a percussion ignition system that increased the reliability and simplicity of longarms.

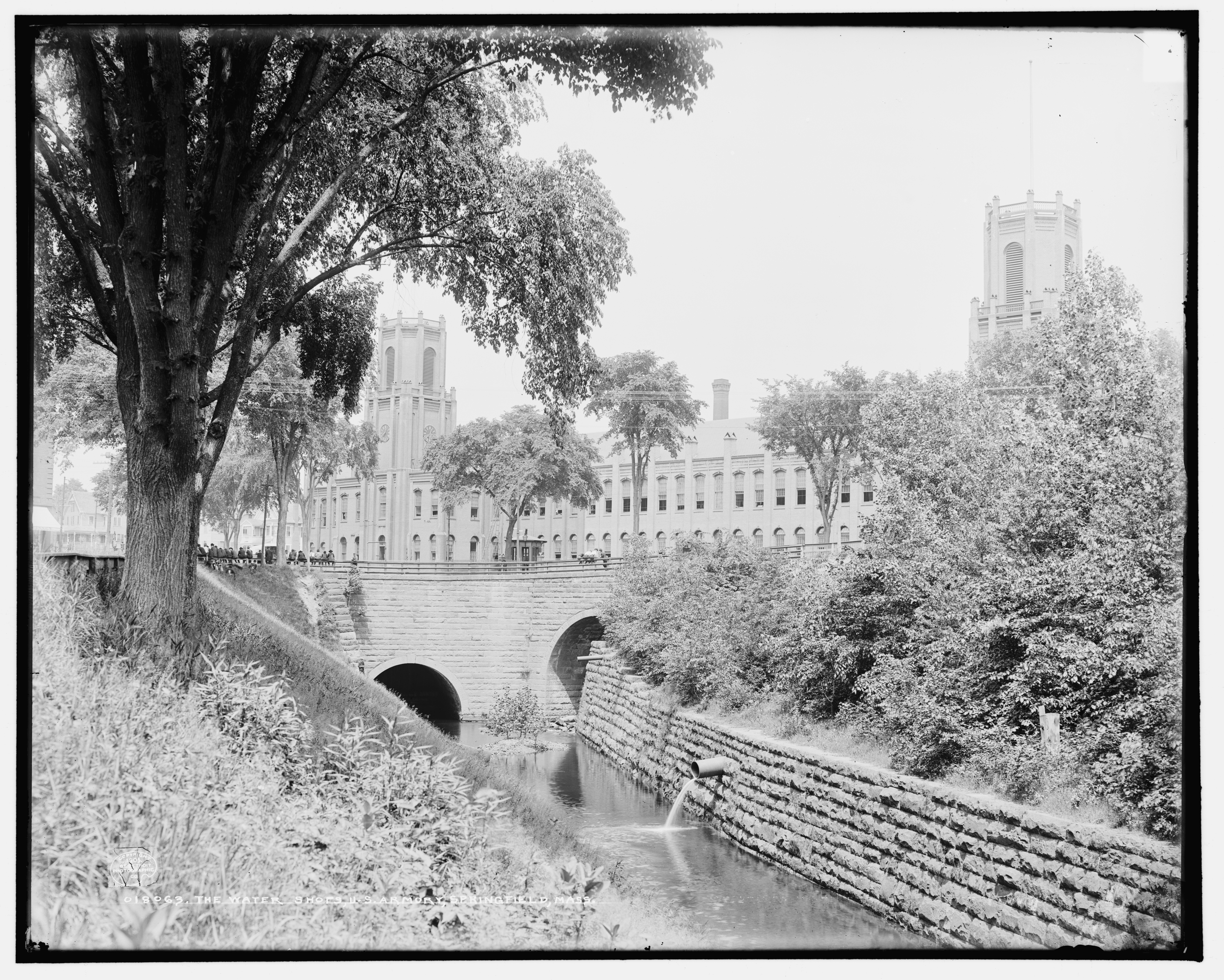
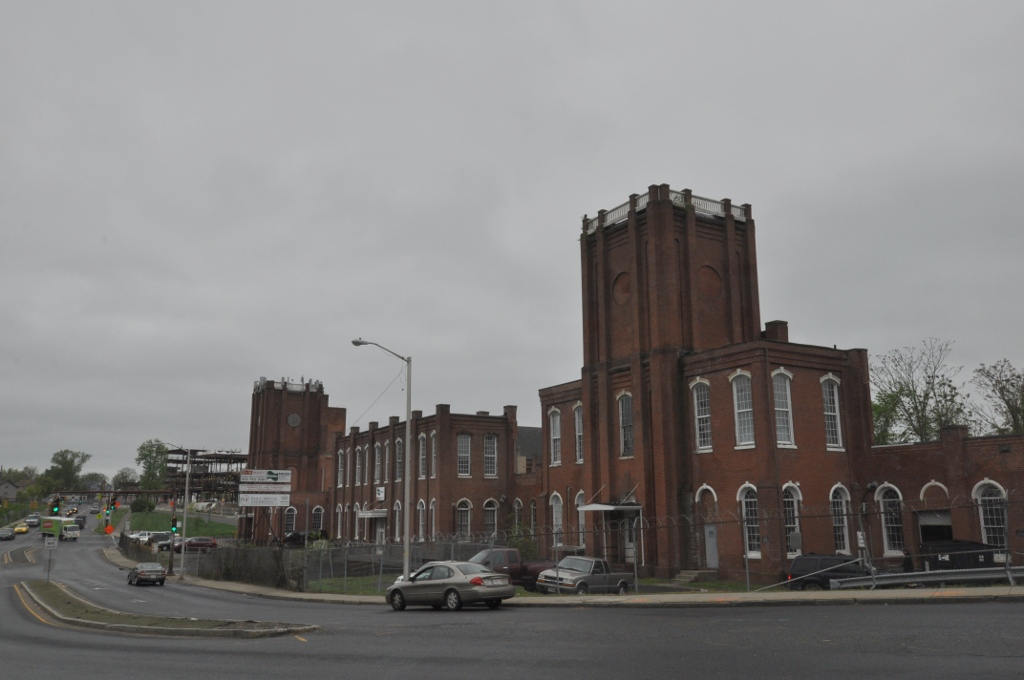
Views of the Water Shops in Springfield, Massachusetts in 1905, and 2014 respectively. The Water Shops served as the epicenter for Springfield Armory firearms production throughout the nineteenth and twentieth centuries.

The Springfield Armory was largely involved in the growth and influence of the Industrial Revolution. Much of this grew out of the military's fascination with interchangeable parts, which was based on the theory that it would be easier to simply replace firearm parts than make battlefield repairs. Mass production of truly interchangeable parts demanded greater use of machines, improved gauging, quality control, and division of labor; all characteristics of the Industrial Revolution. From these individual components, the concept of the assembly line was devised.

The Springfield Armory also contributed to improved business management techniques. Colonel Roswell Lee, hired as superintendent in 1815, brought centralized authority, cost accounting for payroll, time, and materials, and increased discipline to a manufacturing environment—all business practices still in use today.

In 1843, Henry Wadsworth Longfellow visited the Armory and wrote his poem "The Arsenal at Springfield." The anti-war poem described the rows of finished guns, by that point 1,000,000 stockpiled there, stored vertically in open racks: "Like a huge organ, rise the burnished arms."

=== Late 19th century ===
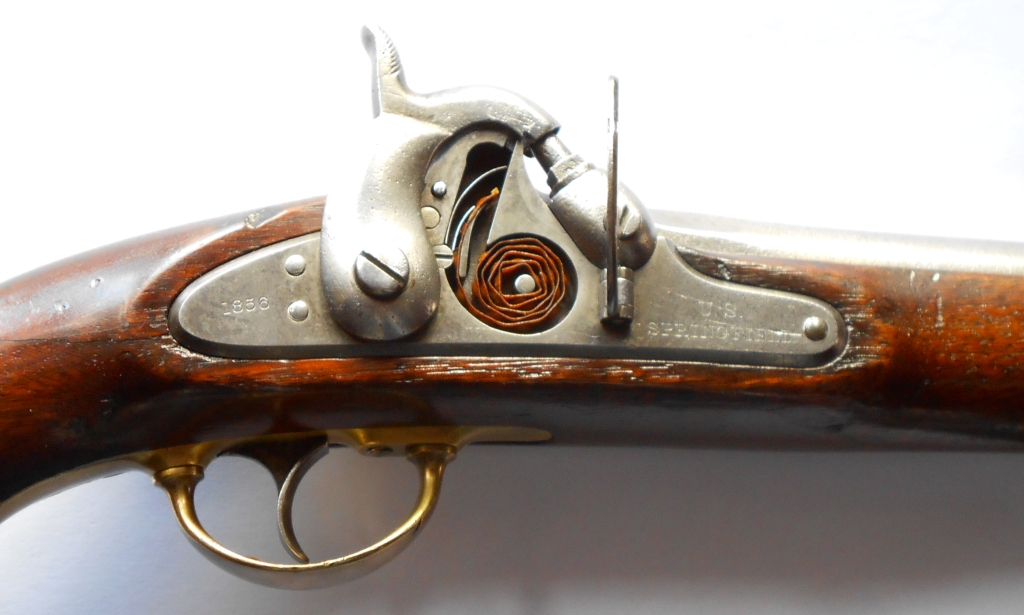
Springfield Model 1855 with Maynard tape primer mechanism

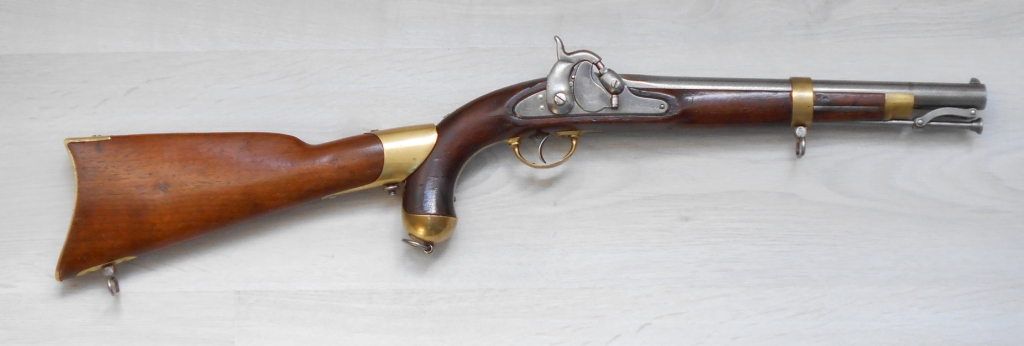
Springfield Model 1855 pistol-carbine

With the destruction of the Harpers Ferry Armory early in the American Civil War, the Springfield Armory was briefly the only government manufacturer of arms, until the Rock Island Arsenal was established in 1862. During this time production ramped up to unprecedented levels never seen in American manufacturing up until that time, with only 9,601 rifles manufactured in 1860, rising to a peak of 276,200 by 1864. These advancements would not only give the Union a decisive technological advantage over the Confederacy during the war but served as a precursor to the mass production manufacturing that contributed to the post-war Second Industrial Revolution and 20th century machine manufacturing capabilities. American historian Merritt Roe Smith has drawn comparisons between the early assembly machining of the Springfield rifles and the later production of the Ford Model T, with the latter having considerably more parts, but producing a similar numbers of units in the earliest years of the 1913–1915 automobile assembly line, indirectly due to mass production manufacturing advancements pioneered by the armory 50 years earlier.

In 1865, Master Armorer Erskine Allin introduced the "Allin Conversion," which incorporated the far more advanced design of breech-loading into the now-obsolete muzzleloaders, thereby extending their service life. In 1891 a new function was assigned to the Armory—it became the army's main laboratory for the development and testing of new small arms.

One of the most distinctive elements of the Armory is the fence surrounding the site, which was started after the Civil War and completed in 1890. Unable to find funding for the purchase of a fence, Major James W. Ripley requested obsolete cannons from government storage, some from the Revolutionary War. He had the cannons sent to a local foundry to be melted down. The foundry kept some of the iron as payment, and the remainder was cast into 9-foot palings, formed as pikes and spearheads which were then sunk into a red sandstone base.

=== Early 20th century ===
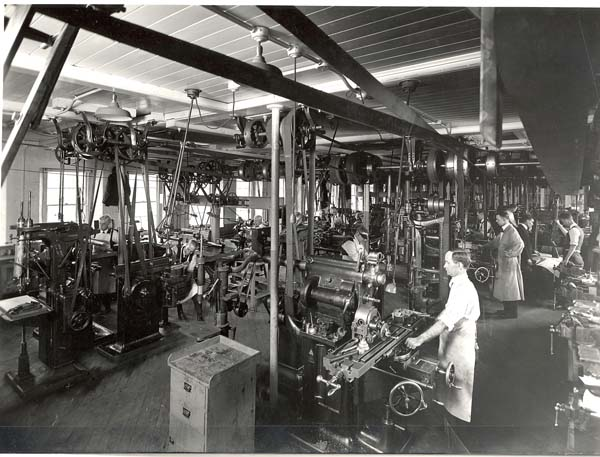
Bldg. 28's experimental shop, where John Garand developed the predecessor to the M1 Garand and the later production model, c. 1923

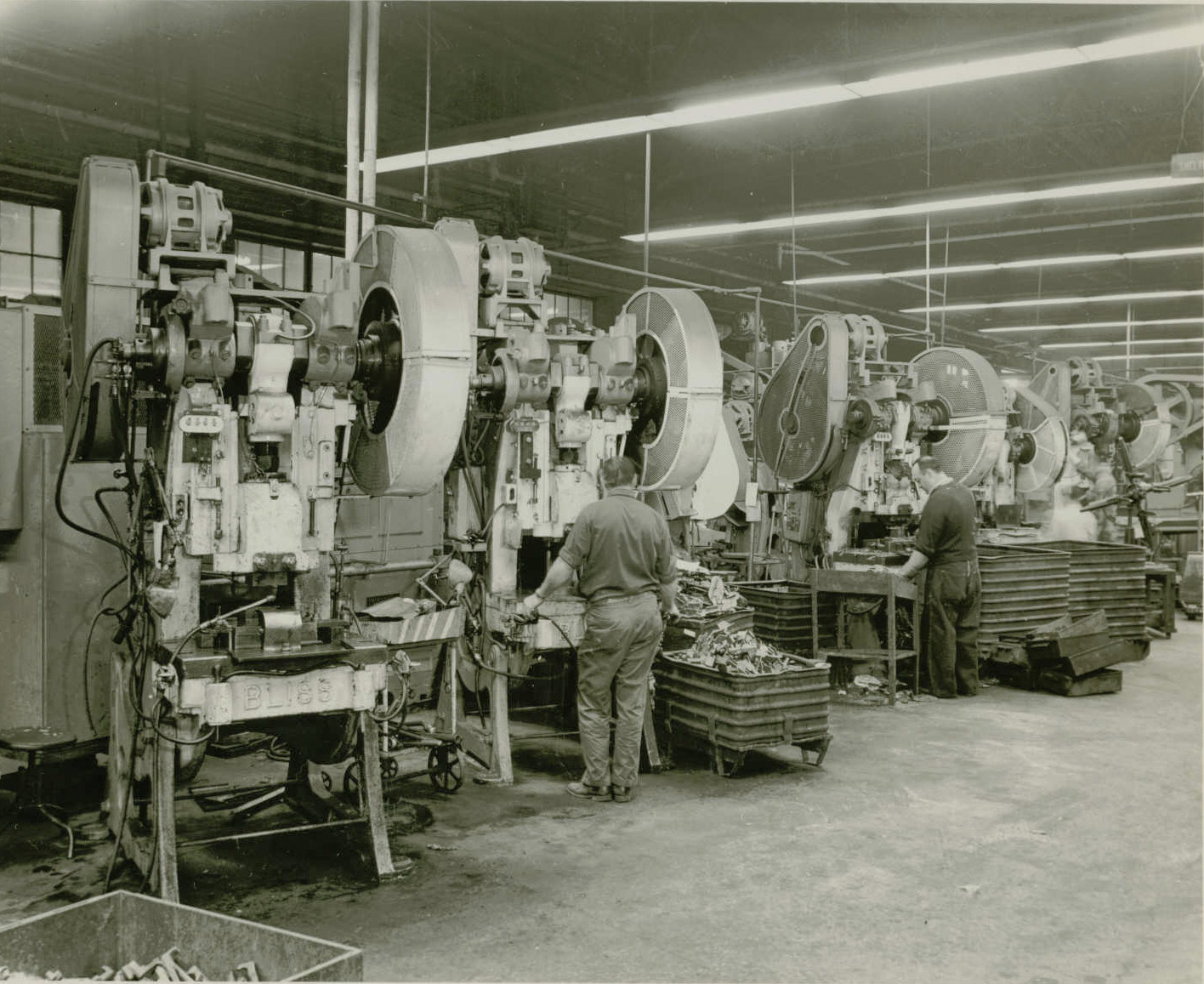
Mechanical presses producing cold-formed steel parts for weaponry in the mid-20th century

During the Spanish–American War, it was recognized that the Spanish Mauser Model 1893, exhibited characteristics superior to the "trapdoor" Springfield and Krag–Jørgensen rifles carried by the United States troops. On August 15, 1900, Springfield Armory completed an experimental magazine rifle which they believed to be an improvement over the Krag. They fashioned a clip loading magazine rifle in which the cartridges were contained within the stock, preventing damage to an otherwise exposed magazine. It was approved for production in as the Model 1903. Mauser later sued for patent infringement and won royalties from Springfield.

By the time that the United States entered World War I, approximately 843,239 standard service Model 1903 rifles had been manufactured. However, this was insufficient to arm U.S. troops for an undertaking of the magnitude of World War I. During the war Springfield Armory produced over 265,620 Model 1903 rifles. In addition, the War Department contracted for production of the M1917 Enfield Rifle to help aid American troops. These, along with the additional 47,251 rifles produced by the Rock Island Arsenal and the weapons already in service, were enough to supply the war effort. During World War I the Springfield Armory produced ≈25,000 M1911 pistols before all facilities were dedicated to production of M1903 rifles.

In 1919, when John Garand was 31, he came to Springfield, where he worked to develop a semi-automatic rifle. Over the next five years many designs were submitted for the rifle, but none met the army's rigid specifications. In 1924, Garand offered a design that was approved for further testing. This was the famous M1, or "Garand rifle" as it came to be known. The army adopted the rifle in 1936, and production began the next year. This began what was to become the greatest production effort in the armory's history: during the entire production history of the M1 rifle, the Springfield Armory produced over 4.5 million of them.

The M1's accuracy and durability in battle earned it high praise. General Douglas MacArthur reported on the M1 to the Ordnance Department during heavy fighting on Bataan that "Under combat conditions it operated with no mechanical defects and when used in foxholes did not develop stoppages from dust or dirt. It has been in almost constant action for as much as a week without cleaning or lubrication." Further testament to the M1s role in combat was given by another well-respected military officer, General George S. Patton, Jr., who reported to the Army Ordnance Department on January 26, 1945, "In my opinion, the M1 Rifle is the greatest battle implement ever devised."

=== Late 20th century ===
The last small arm developed by the Armory was the M14 rifle, which was, essentially, a highly modified version of the M1 Garand. The M14 was produced from 1959 to 1964 and was the U.S. Army's primary combat rifle until being replaced by the M16 rifle gradually from 1964 to 1970. The M14 has evolved over the years into a more modern sniper rifle—the M21.

By the time the U.S. was involved in the Vietnam War, Springfield Armory developed not only rifles but machine guns for ground and air use, grenade launchers, and associated equipment. Many weapons were not manufactured at the Armory, but plans and specifications were drawn up for the use of private contractors who built them elsewhere, representing an economic shift toward the American private arms industry.

== Closure and rebirth as a National Historic Site (1968–present) ==
Map of the Springfield Armory campus

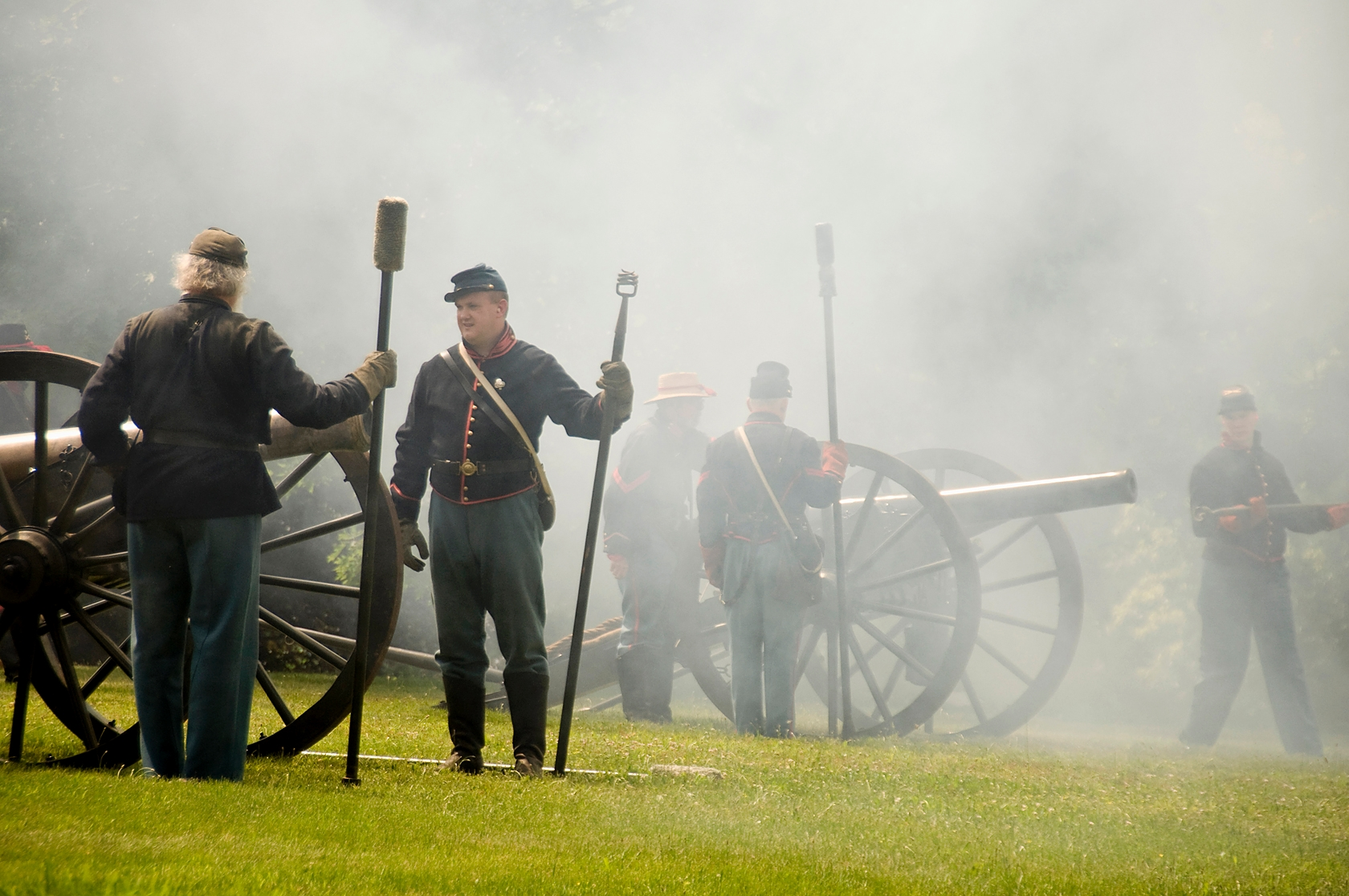
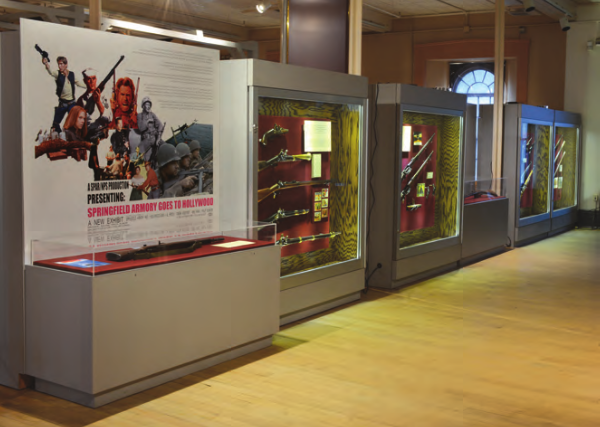
Re-enactors demonstrate the firing of field artillery from the American Civil War; a 2015 exhibit on weaponry from the armory collection used in major motion pictures

In 1968, the Springfield Armory was closed. Outer portions of the armory were sold off, including the "Water Shops" production facilities, which are listed on the National Register of Historic Places as the Water Shops Armory. The core site was preserved and the property was turned over to the city and state.

It is now the Springfield Armory National Historic Site, and is managed and operated by the National Park Service. As of 2011, the 35 acres behind the Springfield Armory (and several of its former buildings) housed Springfield Technical Community College (STCC). STCC is the only "technical" community college in Massachusetts, which aims to continue the legacy of technological innovation at the Springfield Armory site.

The Main Arsenal Building and the Commanding Officer's Quarters were extensively renovated by Eastern General Contractors of Springfield, Massachusetts between 1987 and 1991. The Main Arsenal now houses the Springfield Armory Museum, which includes the Benton Small Arms Collection, one of the largest collections of weaponry.

== Use of the name "Springfield Armory" ==
Following the closure of the U.S. Army Springfield Armory in 1968, the L. H. Gun Co. of Devine, Texas, was renamed Springfield Armory, Inc. to capitalize on the name recognition. There is no affiliation or licensing between the original Springfield Armory and Springfield Armory, Inc., despite a timeline on the commercial website of the latter that includes the history of the former. The company's products include M1911 pistols and the M1A rifle series.

== See also ==
- National Register of Historic Places listings in Springfield, Massachusetts
- National Register of Historic Places listings in Hampden County, Massachusetts
- List of National Historic Landmarks in Massachusetts
- List of military installations in Massachusetts
