= Harpers Ferry Armory =

Former United States federal armory

Coordinates: 39.299°N 77.863°W

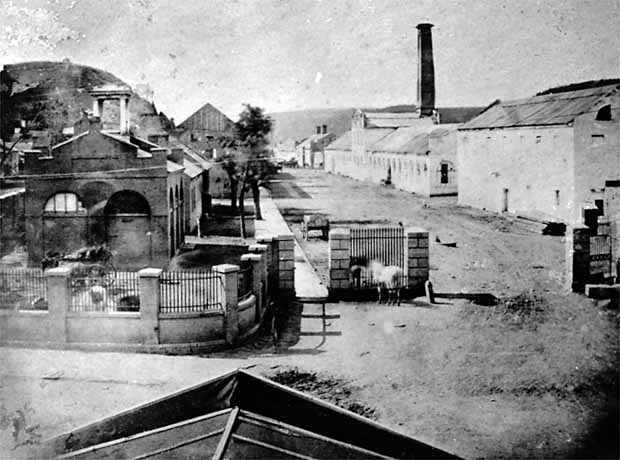
Harpers Ferry Armory in 1862

The Harpers Ferry Armory, more formally known as the United States Armory and Arsenal at Harpers Ferry, was the second federal armory created by the United States government; the first was the Springfield Armory. It was located in Harpers Ferry, then part of Virginia, which since 1863 has been part of West Virginia. It was both an arsenal, manufacturing firearms, and an armory, a storehouse for firearms. Along with the Springfield Armory, it was instrumental in the development of machining techniques to make interchangeable parts of precisely the same dimensions.

The armory was a long, narrow complex of buildings, located alongside the Baltimore and Ohio Railroad line on a strip of land alongside the Potomac River. The entrance was close to the center of town, with its train station and hotels, and the bridge, the B & O Railroad Potomac River Crossing. At its peak, just before the Civil War, the armory had 400 employees. As of that date, the armory had manufactured some 600,000 firearms.

During the American Civil War, the armory was destroyed and its equipment removed; it was not rebuilt. The only surviving building is its former fire engine house, known today as John Brown's Fort. As of 2026, it is not in its original location.

== The national armory ==
In 1794, the U.S. Congress passed a bill calling "for the erecting and repairing of Arsenals and Magazines". President George Washington, given wide latitude in carrying out this order, selected Harpers Ferry, then a part of Virginia, for the location of the Harpers Ferry National Armory. George Washington believed that an inland location would be more defensible against foreign military attack. However, his friends had an interest in the Potomac Company, which influenced his decision to locate the armory. In 1796, the United States government purchased a 125-acre (0.51 km^{2}) parcel of land from the heirs of Robert Harper. Subsequently, in 1799, construction began on the national armory. Three years later, mass production of military arms commenced.

The national armory at Harpers Ferry was actually the second national armory. The first was the Springfield Armory, constructed in Springfield, Massachusetts in 1794 after Congress approved the bill to create the nation's first national armory.

Upon its grand opening, the armory's size seemed inadequate for a work force. It consisted of only one room, and the workers numbered a mere twenty-five. Nevertheless, the armory produced many muskets, rifles, and later pistols for the United States. Between 1821–1830 the armory produced 11,855 arms. Each decade after that, production declined. The building relied on river power to drive the armory's machinery.

=== Expansion and upgrades ===
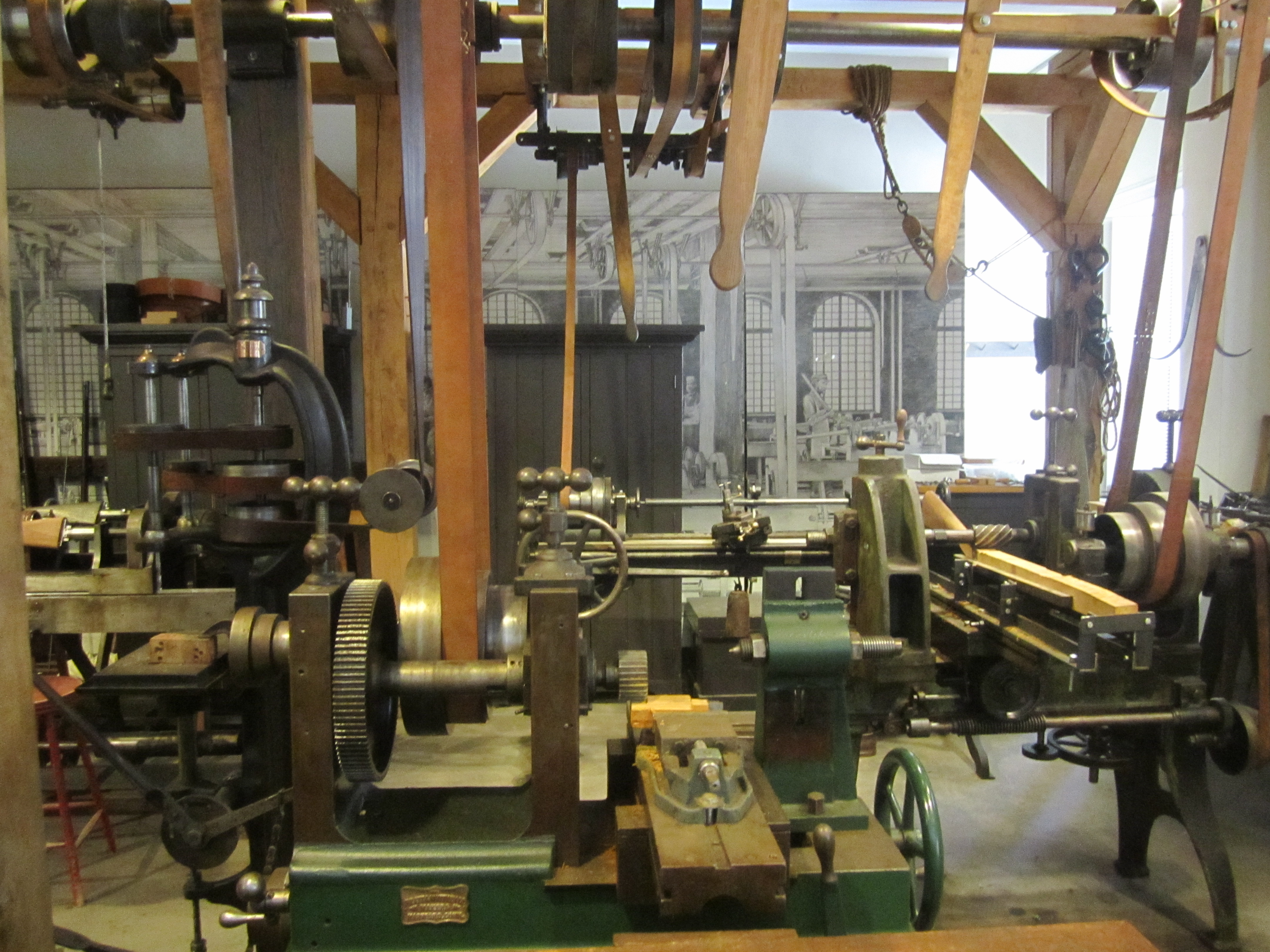
Gun smithing equipment on display at Harpers Ferry National Historical Park

In 1844, the deficient state of the armory was taken into account and demand for military equipment increased, and so the renovation and expansion of the armory was undertaken. The upgrades of the arsenal began in 1845–1854 with the construction of seven brand new workshops and the installation of 121 new machines. The new workshops had a brick superstructure with iron framing and slanted sheet metal roofing. These reconstructed arsenal buildings became collectively known as the "U.S. Musket Factory". The armory canal was enlarged so that more water could get to the armory, which meant it would receive more power. Along with the enlargement of the canal, seven new water turbines were installed. The upgrades formed a well-integrated functional unit that improved the flow of work from one stage of production to the next. All the expansions of the armory were done on heavy stone foundations and included cast-iron framing in the general style of "factory Gothics" architecture.

In addition, more people were employed to work at the armory than before: the labor force increased from a minuscule twenty-five in 1802 to about four hundred workers in 1859. Furthermore, the working conditions improved, but only slightly.

=== John Brown's raid ===
In 1859, the armory became the site of the famous seizure by abolitionist John Brown, which, while unsuccessful in inciting a slave revolt, helped precipitate the American Civil War and the eventual emancipation of slaves in the United States.

=== During the Civil War ===
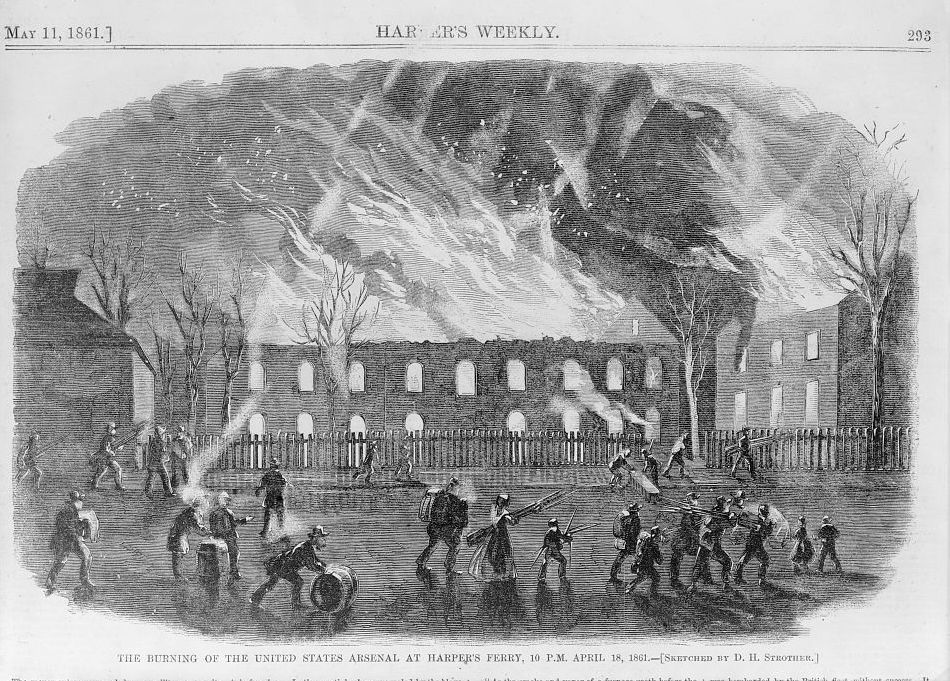
The burning of the United States arsenal at Harper's Ferry, 10 P.M. April 18, 1861, sketched by D. H. Strother.

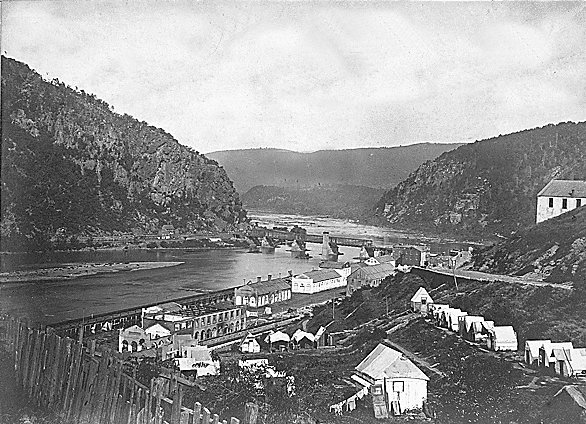
Harpers Ferry in 1865, looking east (downstream); the ruins of the musket factory can be seen in the center

While Virginia was still in the Union, the armory regularly shipped manufactured weapons and material throughout the United States. However, once the Civil War began, the national armory became a vital control point for both the Confederates and the Union.

Close to the beginning of the war on April 18, 1861, just a day after Virginia's conventional ratification of secession, Union soldiers, outnumbered and deprived of reinforcements, set fire to their own armory in an attempt to thwart the usage of it by an advancing Virginian Confederate militia numbering 360 men in all. Harpers Ferry residents (many of whom made their living off the armory) were able to put out the fires swiftly enough to save most of the armory's weapon-making machinery. After rescuing the equipment from the fire, the Confederates stole the equipment and shipped it south by rail to Winchester, Virginia, and from there to Richmond, and use the machinery in the newly reopened, Confederate central government-run Richmond Armory. The South had virtually no small-arms production and an inadequate supply of raw materials. The machinery taken from Harpers Ferry became the foundation of the Confederate arms manufacturing. Equipment used for the production of the Mississippi rifle was installed and put into use at the Fayetteville Arsenal. Two weeks later, the Confederates abandoned Harpers Ferry, while also confiscating what was left in the armory and burning the rest of the remaining buildings. They also blew up the railroad bridge of the Baltimore and Ohio Railroad, but returned in two weeks to destroy the Rifle Works and a bridge that crossed the Shenandoah river.

==== The armory's strategic location ====
During the Civil War, the armory became a site of great strategic importance because it was located very close to the Mason–Dixon line, or the border between the free and the slave-holding states. Consequently, the Union used it as an effective means to supply troops with weapons quickly as they marched into battle. The downside to being on the border was that the armory could easily change hands and fall into Confederate control–the town of Harpers Ferry changed hands at least eleven times during the Civil War.

=== Aftermath of the Civil War ===
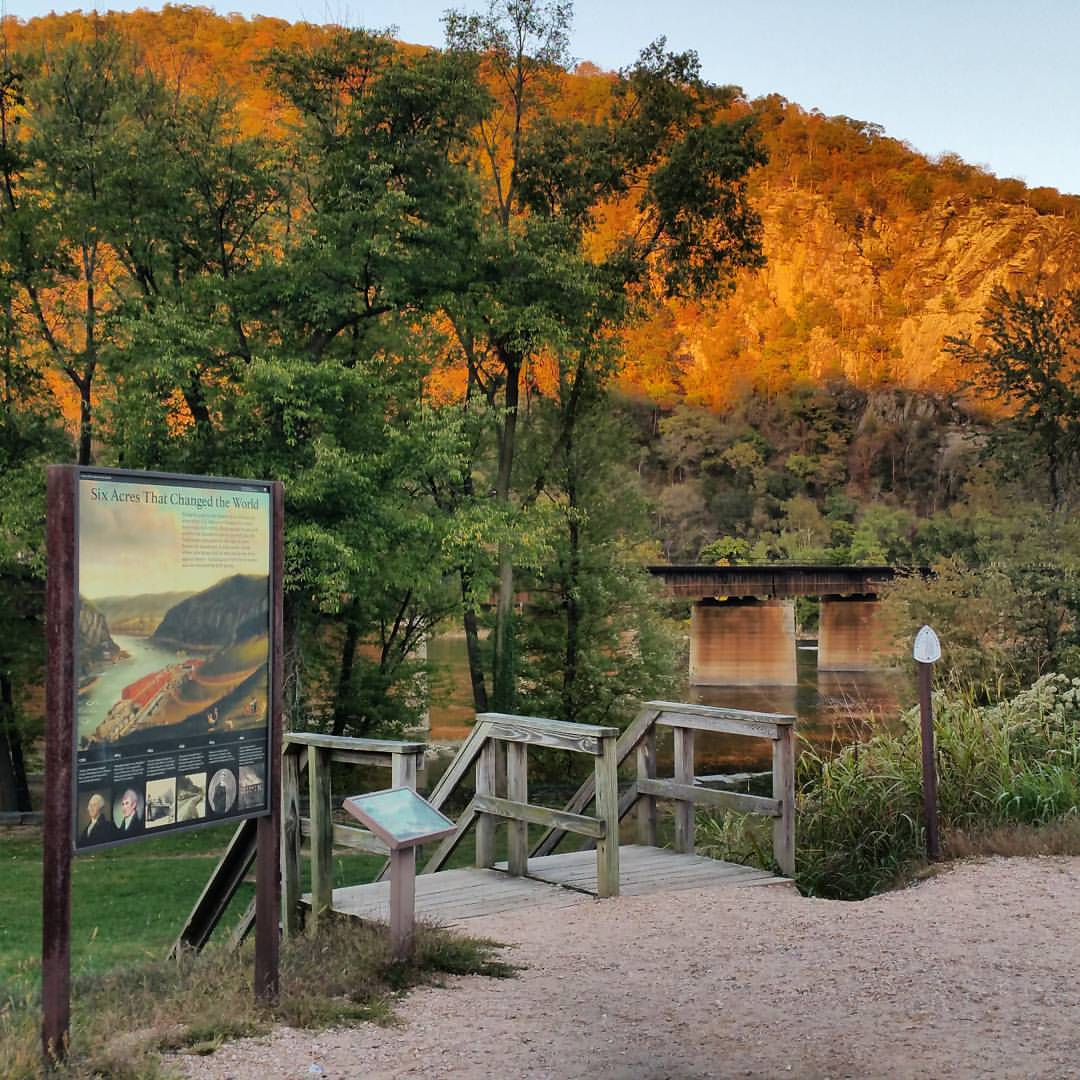
Overlooking the U.S. Armory (Musket Factory) archaeology site (NPS Photo/Hammer)

Due to the degree of damage to the armory during the Civil War, the U.S. government decided not to re-establish the armory at Harpers Ferry, instead focusing the quickly developing areas west of the Mississippi River.

Today the site is mostly covered by railroad track embankments.

=== John Brown's Fort ===
John Brown's Fort was the only building to survive the destruction wrought upon it by the Confederates and the Union forces. It was the armory's fire engine and guard house, which Brown and his raiders barricaded themselves in. It was given the name of John Brown's Fort after the war.

This building has been moved four times. The first time, freeing up the site for the railroad to use for an embankment, it was moved to Chicago, where it was displayed at the 1893 Columbian Exposition. Abandoned after that, it was moved back to a farm near Harpers Ferry. From there, it was moved to the place it was the longest, and where it was most honored: Storer College, a school established for freedmen in Harpers Ferry, which also was given by Congress the Arsenal managers' housing, set back on Camp Hill.

The Fort remained at Storer until after the College closed in 1955, contributing greatly to Harpers Ferry's role as a destination for African-American tourists in the late 19th and early 20th centuries. It was afterwards moved by the National Park Service to near its original location.

== See also ==
- John Brown's Fort
- Harpers Ferry Model 1803 Rifle
- M1819 Hall rifle
- M1841 Mississippi rifle
- John H. Hall (soldier)
- Storer College
