= William Hooper (disambiguation) =

William Hooper (1742–1790) was an American political leader from North Carolina who signed the United States Declaration of Independence.

William Hooper may also refer to:

- William Hooper (Newfoundland politician) (1787–1864), English-born merchant and political figure in Newfoundland
- William Northey Hooper (1809–1878), American businessman in the sugar industry
- William Hooper (Ohio businessman) (1812–1894), state treasurer of Ohio 1865-1866
- William Henry Hooper (1813–1882), delegate from the Territory of Utah
- William Hooper (chemist) (1817/8–1877), British chemist
- William Hooper (Canadian politician) (1824–after 1873), politician from Prince Edward Island, Canada
- William Hulme Hooper (1826–1854), Royal Navy officer
- William Harcourt Hooper (1834–1912), British artist, engraver and printmaker
- William B. Hooper (1841–1870), Union Army soldier in the American Civil War and Medal of Honor recipient
- William Leslie Hooper (1855–1918), acting president of Tufts College, 1912–1914
- Bill Hooper (footballer, born 1884) (1884–1952), English footballer
- Bill Hooper (English footballer) (1894–1982), English football forward
- Bill Hooper (New Zealand footballer) (c. 1900–1964)
- William John Hooper (1916–1996), British cartoonist
- Willie Hooper (died 1946), Irish doctor and soccer player
- William Tobe Hooper (1943–2017), American film director, screenwriter, and producer
- Jack Hooper (intelligence officer) or William John Hooper (born 1953), former deputy director of the Canadian Security Intelligence Service
- William Hooper (missionary), translator of the Old Testament into Hindi

== See also ==
- Billy Hooper (1931–1981), American football player
