= Merrill carbine =

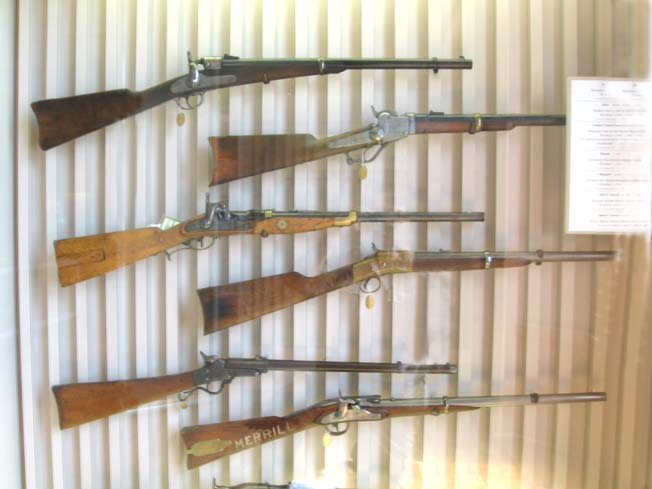
- Merrill carbine at the Springfield National Historic Site
- Type: Carbine
- Place of origin: United States

Service history
- In service: 1863–1865
- Used by: United States; Argentina (Limited)
- Wars: American Civil War

Production history
- Designer: James H. Merrill
- Designed: 1858
- Manufacturer: Merrill & Thomas, Baltimore, MD
- Unit cost: $20 (1861)
- No. built: 14,500

Specifications
- Barrel length: 24.5 inches (620 mm)
- Calibre: .54
- Action: Tilting-block

The Merrill carbine was a breechloader firearm designed by Baltimore, Maryland gunsmith and inventor James H. Merrill. It was one of several firearms either manufactured or altered by Merrill in fulfillment of contracts with the Union government during the U.S. Civil War.

== Overview ==
The carbine was a single-shot, percussion, breechloader used mainly by Union cavalry units. It used the .54 caliber Minie balls with paper cartridges which were loaded by lifting the top of the breech lever. The barrels were 22 1/8 inches and round with one barrel band.

14,495 Merrill carbines were purchased by the US Army Ordnance Department between 1 January 1861 and 30 June 1866. Known regiments where the carbines were issued are:

- New York 1st, 5th, and 18th
- Pennsylvania 11th, 17th, and 18th
- New Jersey 1st
- Indiana 7th
- Wisconsin 1st and 3rd
- Kentucky 27th
- Delaware 1st
- Michigan 6th

=== Models ===
The carbines were produced in two versions: First Type and Second Type. The First Type included a brass patch box in the stock and had the breech lever secured by a flat, knurled latch. The Second Type was produced without the patch box and had the breech lever secured with a rounded, button type latch.

== Other production ==
James H. Merrill produced or altered several other firearms which include: the Jenks-Merrill carbine; the Merrill rifle; and the Merrill, Latrobe, & Thomas Carbine.

=== Jenks-Merrill carbine ===
The Jenks-Merrill carbine was an altered firearm by James H Merrill. The carbine was a .54 caliber, single -shot, percussion, breechloader with a 24 1/4 inch round barrel and two barrel bands. Approximately 300 were modified for the U.S. Navy to use the action from the Merrill carbine.

=== Merrill rifle ===
The Merrill rifle was produced from 1862 to 1865 with a total quantity estimated at over 800. The rifle was a .54 caliber, single -shot, percussion, breechloader with an action identical to the Merrill Carbine, but with a 33-inch barrel, two barrel bands, and a lug for attaching a bayonet. It also had a brass patch box similar to the First Type carbine. Serial numbers are in the "5000 - 14000" range. Of the rifles produced, 770 were purchased by the Union government during the Civil War. Most were issued to infantry regiments with small quantities issued to sharpshooters.

=== Merrill, Latrobe, & Thomas carbine ===
The Merrill, Latrobe, & Thomas carbine was a carbine designed by James Merrill and manufactured by Samuel Remington of E. Remington and Sons in 1855. The carbine was a .58 caliber, single-shot, breechloader with a 21-inch round barrel and a single barrel band. One hundred and seventy were purchased by the U.S. Ordnance Department for trial use.

== See also ==
- Rifles in the American Civil War
