= Sarah Corson Downs =

American temperance activist (1822–1891)

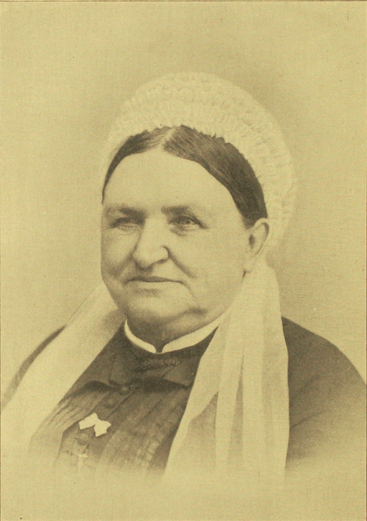
Sarah Jane Corson Downs

Sarah Jane Corson Downs (née, Corson; also known as "Mother Downs"; December 19, 1822 – November 10/11, 1891) was a 19th-century American temperance activist and social reformer. She was one of the best-known temperance advocates in the U.S., and was the state organizer in New Jersey of the Woman's Christian Temperance Union (WCTU). Since the organization of the State union, she served as its president. She was also an active worker in the church. Central in her life was Evangelical Methodism. Downs traveled thousands of miles up and down the State of New Jersey, wrote voluminously, and spoke at hundreds of gatherings. She always took an active part in the services of the Ocean Grove Camp Meeting Association.

== Early life and education ==
Sarah Jane Corson was born in Philadelphia, Pennsylvania, December 19, 1822. Her parents were Ann Somers (Addis) Corson (1782–1867) and James Corson (1784–1827). Sarah's siblings were Thomas, John, and Elizabeth. Her ancestry is traced to Dutch (Neswinger, White, and Corson) and English (Addis and Taylor) forebears. While she was yet an infant, the family moved to Addisville, in Bucks County, Pennsylvania, which was named for her grandfather, Enoch Addis. Subsequently, the family moved to Pennington, New Jersey.

She graduated from the Pennington Female Institute, a Methodist school, being the valedictorian of the first graduating class.

== Career ==
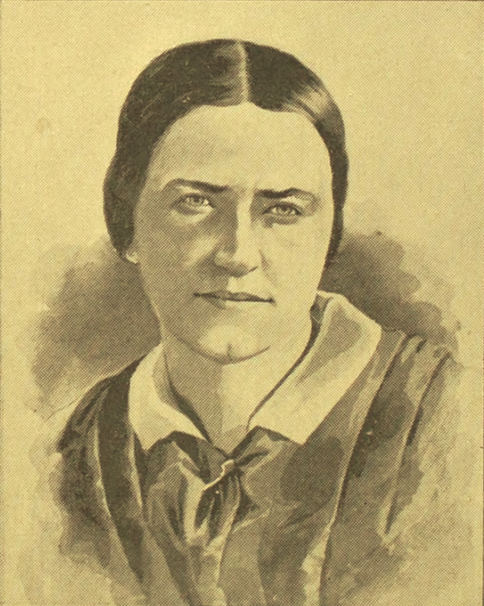
Sarah Downs, age 26

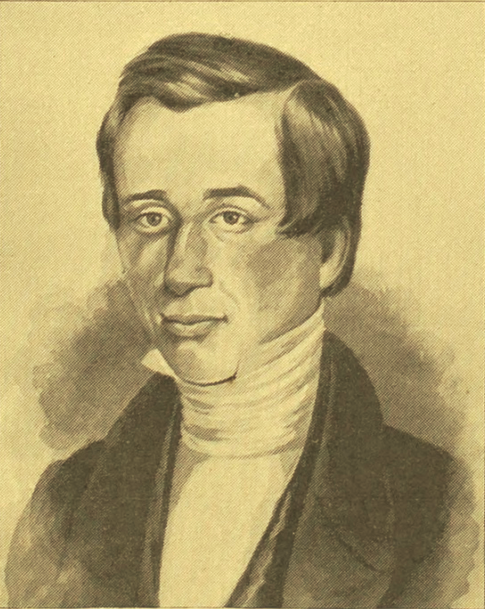
Rev. Charles Stewart Downs

After graduation, she began teaching. While teaching at New Egypt, New Jersey, she met Rev. Charles Stewart Downs, whom she married May 16, 1850. He was an itinerant minister of the Methodist Episcopal Church in the New Jersey Conference. He died from consumption in 1870.

After she was widowed, she maintained a private school. She taught in Tuckerton, New Jersey where she was largely instrumental in the building of the church there. All the while, Downs was caring for and educating her children.

When, in 1881, she was elected its state president, there were only 26 Unions in the state and 517 members. In 1891, there were 208 Unions, with a paid-up membership of 6,732. In 1881, only US$1,443 were raised for all purposes; in 1891, a total of US$42,371 was reported. Downs' success as an organizer, was remarkable, her judgment unerring, and her executive powers of a high order. For ten years, she was president of the W.C.T.U. of New Jersey, dominating the work of the organization in that territory and carrying it forward, by the sheer force of her personality and enthusiasm. She traveled thousands of miles up and down the State, wrote voluminously, and spoke at hundreds of gatherings. In church and W.C.T.U. work, she had the affection of her followers. Throughout the many years of her public and semi-public life, Downs was known to her co-workers, to ministers, and to most people who knew her as "Mother Downs".

== Death and legacy ==
Downs continued her chosen work almost up to the day of her death, November 10, 1891, (Note: According to The Shore Press obituary, Downs died November 11, 1891.) in East Orange, New Jersey. She was 69 years old. Interment was in Rosedale Cemetery, Orange, New Jersey.

Her biographer, Jacob Bentley Graw, published Life of Mrs. S. J. C. Downs: Or, Ten Years at the Head of the Woman's Christian Temperance Union of New Jersey in the following year.
