= Charles E. Wilson (Medal of Honor) =

American soldier in the American Civil War

- Born: 1840; Bucks County, Pennsylvania, U.S.
- Died: August 15, 1915 (aged 74–75); Trenton, New Jersey, U.S.
- Allegiance: United States
- Branch: Army
- Battles / wars: American Civil War
- Awards: Medal of Honor

Charles E. Wilson (1840 – August 15, 1915) was an American soldier and recipient of the Medal of Honor during the American Civil War.

== Biography ==
Wilson was born in 1840 in Bucks County, Pennsylvania, and died August 15, 1915, in Trenton, New Jersey. During the Civil War he enlisted in the 1st New Jersey Cavalry and served as a sergeant. He earned his medal in the Battle of Sayler's Creek, Virginia on April 6, 1865. The medal was presented to him on July 3, 1865.

== Medal of Honor citation ==

Medal of Honor citation reads:

For extraordinary heroism on 6 April 1865, in action at Deatonsville (Sailor's Creek), Virginia. Sergeant Wilson charged the enemy's works, colors in hand, and had two horses shot from under him.
