= George J. Seabury =

American chemist and pharmacist (1844–1909)

George John Seabury
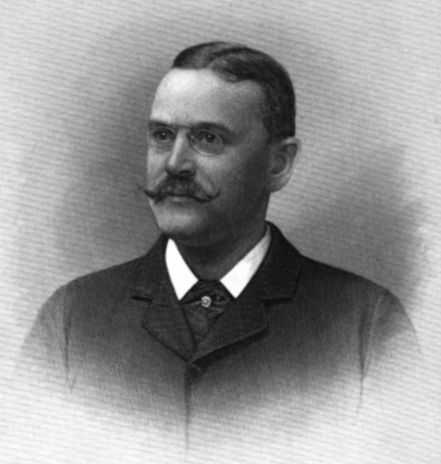
- Born: November 10, 1844; New York, New York
- Died: February 13, 1909 (aged 64); New York, New York
- Resting place: Rosedale Cemetery; Orange, New Jersey
- Occupation: Businessman
- Known for: pharmaceutical manufacturer
- Political party: Republican
- Spouse: Ella Green Bensen
- Children: 4
- Parent(s): Michael J. Seabury (Seeberg), Agnes Z. Calender

George John Seabury (November 10, 1844 – February 13, 1909) was an American chemist and pharmacist. In 1874 he and Robert Wood Johnson invented a new type of adhesive bandage.

== Biography ==
Seabury was born in New York on November 10, 1844. He was the son of Michael Seeberg, an immigrant from Baden, Germany. He served in the Army during the early part of the American Civil War. He first enlisted as a drummer boy in the Twelfth Regiment and served for more than a year in the Army of the Potomac.

Together with Robert Wood, Seabury improved on the medicated adhesive plaster by introducing a rubber base. This new adhesive surgical dressing reduced sepsis in wounds.

Seabury died at his home in New York on February 15, 1909. He first suffered an attack of influenza and was followed by pneumonia, which caused his death. He is buried in Orange, New Jersey's Rosedale Cemetery.

== Works ==
- Shall Pharmacists Become Tradesmen (1899)
- The Constructive and Reconstructive Forces Essential to Maintain American International Supremacy (1902)
