= David Southard =

United States Army Medal of Honor recipient (1845–1894)

- Born: c. 1845; Jackson Township, New Jersey, US
- Died: May 6, 1894 (aged 48–49); Pennsylvania, US
- Burial place: Zion Methodist Church Cemetery New Egypt, New Jersey
- Military career
- Allegiance: United States of America; Union
- Branch: United States Army; Union Army
- Service years: 1861–1865
- Rank: Sergeant
- Units: Company C, 1st New Jersey Volunteer Cavalry
- Conflicts: American Civil War; *Battle of Sailors Creek
- Awards: Medal of Honor

David Southard (c. 1845 – May 6, 1894) was a Union Army soldier during the American Civil War who received America's highest military decoration the Medal of Honor for his actions at the Battle of Sailors Creek

== Civil War Service ==
He enlisted in the 1st New Jersey Volunteer Cavalry in the summer of 1861, and was mustered in as a private in the unit's Company C on August 17, 1861. He served in the field continuously through the next four years, re-enlisting on February 25, 1864. A combination of excellent field service combined with the attrition the war took on his Company, he rose in the latter half of 1864, being promoted to Corporal on September 1, 1864, and to Sergeant on December 12, 1864. He took part in the Union cavalry operations in March and April 1865 that contributed to the surrender of the Army of Northern Virginia, performed post-war occupation duty, and was mustered out of service on July 24, 1865.

On April 6, 1865, he fought in the Battle of Sailor's Creek, Virginia. There in the midst of the battle he performed his act of bravery that would garner him the Medal of Honor, as his citation explains – "Capture of flag; and was the first man over the works in the charge". His Medal was awarded to him on July 3, 1865. Eleven other members of the 1st New Jersey Cavalry were also awarded the Medal of Honor for their bravery during the Civil War, making it the most decorated New Jersey Civil War regiment.

== Later life ==
Sergeant Southard was one of four brothers who fought in the Civil War, all of whom survived the war. He retired to Ocean County, New Jersey, where he died in 1894.

== Medal of Honor citation ==

Rank and Organization:

Sergeant, Company C, 1st New Jersey Cavalry. Place and date. At Sailors Creek, Va., April 6, 1865. Entered service at:------. Birth: Ocean County, N.J. Date of issue: July 3, 1865.

Citation:

Capture of flag; and was the first man over the works in the charge.

== See also ==
- List of Medal of Honor recipients
- List of American Civil War Medal of Honor recipients: Q–S
