= Aaron B. Tompkins =

United States Army Medal of Honor recipient (1844–1931)

- Born: February 2, 1844; Orange, New Jersey
- Died: November 27, 1931 (aged 87); Essex County, New Jersey
- Burial place: Rosedale Cemetery, Orange, New Jersey
- Military career
- Allegiance: United States of America; Union
- Branch: United States Army; Union Army
- Rank: Second Lieutenant
- Unit: 1st New Jersey Volunteer Cavalry
- Conflicts: American Civil War
- Awards: Medal of Honor

Aaron Blake Tompkins (February 2, 1844–November 27, 1931) was a cavalry soldier who received the Medal of Honor while serving in the Union Army during the American Civil War.

== Military career ==
Blake joined the 1st New Jersey Volunteer Cavalry in December 1861. He was serving as a Sergeant in Company G when he performed his act of bravery at the April 5, 1865 Battle of Sailor's Creek, Virginia.

His Medal was awarded to him on July 3, 1865, with a citation that reads "Charged into the enemy's ranks and captured a battle flag, having a horse shot under him and his cheeks and shoulders cut with a saber."

He died in Essex County, New Jersey, and was buried in Rosedale Cemetery, Orange, New Jersey.

== Medal of Honor citation ==
Rank and organization: Sergeant, Company G, 1st New Jersey Cavalry. Place and date: At Sailors Creek, Va., April 5, 1865. Entered service at: ------. Birth: Orange, Essex County, N.J. Date of issue: July 3, 1865.

Citation:

Charged into the enemy's ranks and captured a battle flag, having a horse shot under him and his cheeks and shoulders cut with a saber.

== See also ==
- List of Medal of Honor recipients
- List of American Civil War Medal of Honor recipients: T–Z
