= Charles Titus =

American soldier in the American Civil War

- Born: January 1, 1838; Millstone, New Jersey
- Died: March 26, 1921 (aged 83); Belmar, New Jersey
- Military career
- Allegiance: United States
- Branch: United States Army; Union Army
- Service years: 1861–1865
- Rank: Sergeant
- Unit: 1st New Jersey Volunteer Cavalry
- Conflicts: Battle of Sayler's Creek
- Awards: Medal of Honor

Charles Titus (January 1, 1838 – March 26, 1921) was an American soldier who received the Medal of Honor for valor during the American Civil War.

== Biography ==
Titus joined the 1st New Jersey Cavalry in August 1861. He received the Medal of Honor on July 3, 1865, for his actions at the Battle of Sayler's Creek, and mustered out with his regiment in later that same month.

He died at his home in Belmar, New Jersey, on March 26, 1921.

== Medal of Honor citation ==
Citation:

Was among the first to check the enemy's countercharge.

== See also ==
- List of American Civil War Medal of Honor recipients: T-Z
