= John Wilson (Medal of Honor, born 1839) =

John Wilson (c. 1839–unknown) was an English born soldier and recipient of the Medal of Honor during the American Civil War. Little is known about Williams except for information regarding his Medal of Honor action. He was born in Washington, England, in 1839. He served in the 1st New Jersey Cavalry as a sergeant. He earned his medal at Chamberlains Creek, Virginia, on March 31, 1865. The Medal of Honor Historical Society lists Wilson as "Lost to History" because his final resting place is not known.

== Medal of Honor citation ==
For extraordinary heroism on 31 March 1865, in action at Chamberlain's Creek, Virginia. With the assistance of one comrade, Sergeant Wilson headed off the advance of the enemy, shooting two of his Color Bearers; also posted himself between the enemy and the lead horses of his own command, thus saving the herd from capture.
