= Andrew Jackson Davis =

American Spiritualist

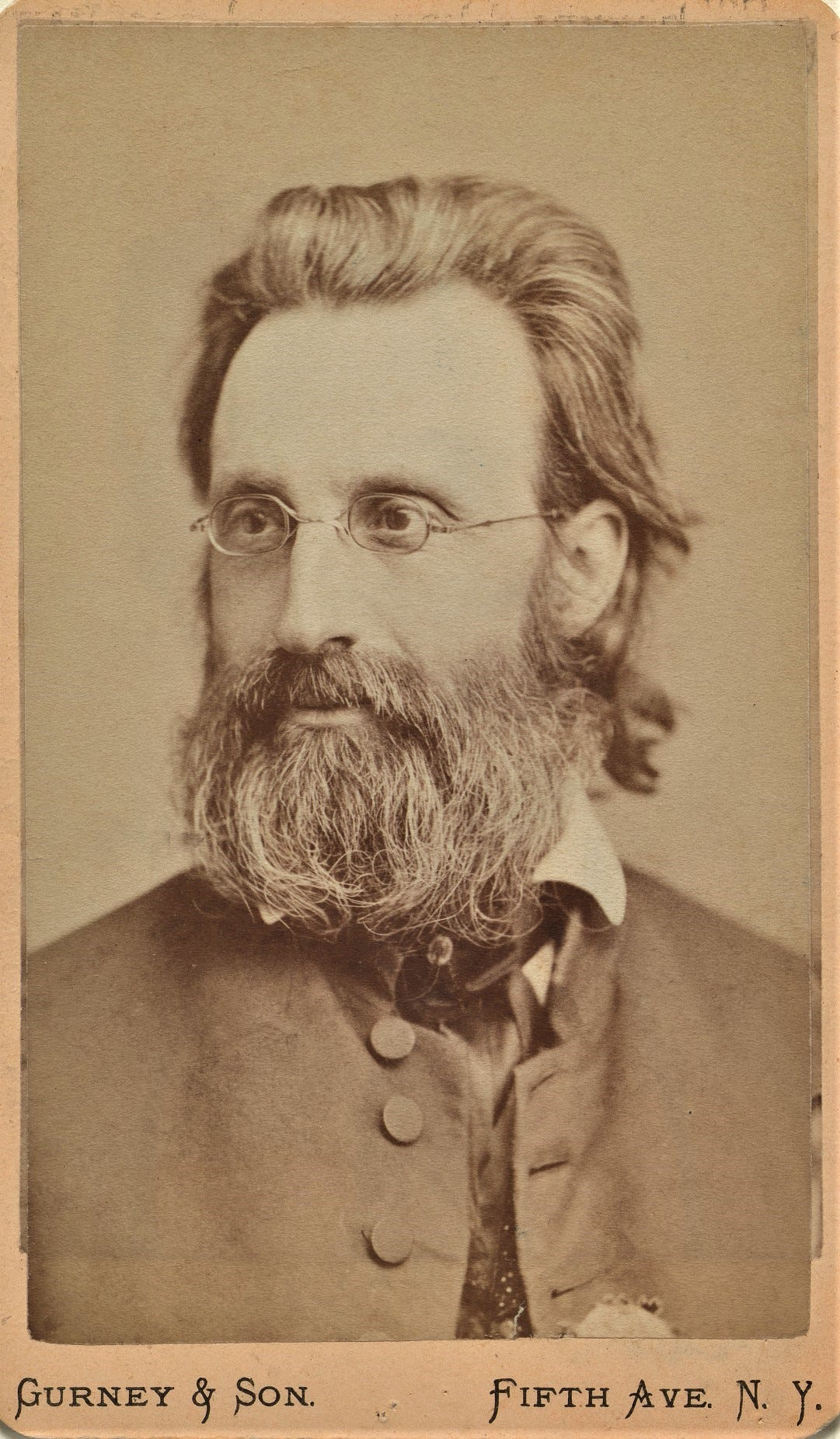
- Andrew Jackson Davis, c. 1860
- Born: August 11, 1826; Blooming Grove, New York, U.S.
- Died: January 13, 1910 (aged 83)
- Occupation: Spiritualist
- Spouse(s): Catherine H. DeWolf (1806-1853) m. 1848; Mary Fenn Robinson (1824-1886) m. 1855; Delphine “Della” Elizabeth Markham (1839-1928) m. 1885

Andrew Jackson Davis (August 11, 1826 – January 13, 1910) was an American spiritualist, born in Blooming Grove, New York.

== Early years ==
Davis was the son of a shoemaker and had little education. From age 14, Davis claimed to be able to diagnose illness via clairvoyance. In 1843 he heard lectures in Poughkeepsie on animal magnetism, the precursor of hypnotism, and came to perceive himself as having remarkable clairvoyant powers. In the following year he received, he said, spiritual messages telling him of his life work. He described himself as "the Poughkeepsie Seer".

== Work ==
For the next three years (1844–1847) he practiced magnetic healing, a form of therapy regarded as pseudoscience, and in 1847 he published The Principles of Nature, Her Divine Revelations, and a Voice to Mankind, which starting in 1845 he had dictated while in a trance, while being mesmerized by Dr. Silas S. Lyon to his scribe, William Fishbough. In this book Andrew Jackson Davis accurately reports the length of the day for Mars, Jupiter and Saturn, but wasn't close for Venus or Mercury. Astronomers had previously reported the length of the day for Mars and Jupiter hundreds of years earlier, but this wasn't widely known outside the academic world; they didn't calculate the length of the day for Saturn until well over a hundred years after Davis reported it. However the vast majority of Davis's claims about advanced plant and animal life on Mercury, Venus, Mars, Jupiter and Saturn are now proven to be false.

There were 267 witnesses who signed or attested to having heard one or more portions of Andrew Jackson Davis dictating "The Principles of Nature, Her Divine Revelations, and a Voice to Mankind." One of the most prominent of them was George Bush (biblical scholar) the cousin of George H. W. Bush's great, great, grandfather. Professor Bush initially praised him in his book "Mesmer and Swedenborg" which came out about the same time as "The Principles of Nature," but after reading Davis's book he had second thoughts and wrote "'Davis' Revelations' Revealed" a short pamphlet refuting many of the claims in "The Principles of Nature," however he didn't doubt Davis's sincerity, or the legitimacy of his trances or alleged communication with the spiritual world, instead he came to the conclusion that Davis was deceived by the spirits he allegedly came into contact with, which was supported by some of the teachings Emanuel Swedenborg, which were also quoted in "Mesmer and Swedenborg" where Swedenborg claims that some of the alleged spirits lie.

While in a trance he said that he renounced copyrights to this book, so the copyrights were given to Dr. Silas S. Lyon and William Fishbough. He lectured with little success and returned to writing books, publishing about 30 in all, including

- The Principles of Nature, Her Divine Revelations, and a Voice to Mankind. (1847).
- The Great Harmonia (1850–1861), an encyclopaedia in six volumes;
- The Philosophy of Special Providences (1850), which with its evident rehash of old arguments against special providences and miracles would seem to show that Davis's inspiration was literary;
- The Philosophy of Spiritual Intercourse; Being an Explanation of Modern Mysteries. (1851).
- The Present Age and Inner Life; a Sequel to Spiritual Intercourse, Modern Mysteries Classified and Explained. (1853).
- The Penetralia; Being Harmonial Answers to Important Questions (1856), which allegedly predicted the development of the automobile, road systems, typewriter, and other modern technology years if not decades before they were developed, and claimed the speed of light was 200,000 miles per second 94 years before it was scientifically calculated by Louis Essen showing the true speed was 186,000 miles per second.
- The Magic Staff: An Autobiography (1857), which explains that he was not related to President Andrew Jackson but he was named after him at the recommendation of a neighbor and it was supplemented by Arabula: or, The Divine Guest. Containing a New Collection of New Gospels (1867), the gospels being those according to St. Confucius, St. John (John Greenleaf Whittier), St. Gabriel (Gabriel Derzhavin), St. Octavius (Octavius Frothingham), St. Gerrit (Gerrit Smith), St. Emma (Emma Harding), St. Ralph (Ralph Waldo Emerson), St. Selden (Selden J. Finney), St. Theodore (Theodore Parker), and others;
- A Stellar Key to the Summer Land (1868);
- Tale of a Physician, or, The Seeds and Fruits of Crime (1869)
- The Fountain with Jets of New Meanings (1870)
- Views of Our Heavenly Home (1878)

== Influences and legacy ==
Davis was much influenced by Swedenborg and by the Shakers, who reprinted his panegyric praising Ann Lee in the official work Sketch of Shakers and Shakerism (1884).

In writing his 1845 short story "The Facts in the Case of M. Valdemar", Edgar Allan Poe was informed by Davis's early work after having attended one of his lectures on mesmerism.

Davis's complete library is now housed within the Edgar Cayce Library.

Davis described the concept of Summerland as an undefined location where souls go after death, the secular nature of which was attractive to some non-religious spiritualists.

== Critical reception ==
In 1855, Davis' spiritualism received an extensive critical analysis by theologian Asa Mahan: Modern Mysteries Explained and Exposed. In Four Parts. I. Clairvoyant Revelations of A. J. Davis... A defender of Davis published an 80-page pamphlet attacking Mahan's analysis.

Regarding Davis' book The Principles of Nature, Joseph McCabe has noted "There is no need to examine the book seriously. The scientific errors and crudities of it release any person from considering whether there was any element of revelation in it... Moreover, Davis was a palpable cheat. He maintained that up to that date he had read only one book in his life, and that book was a novel. We know from his admirers that this was not true, and any person can recognize in his pages a very crude and badly digested mess of early scientific literature." Davis also plagiarised long passages from Swedenborg in The Principles of Nature, which some of Davis's believers take as proof that Davis was inhabited by Swedenborg.

Physician James Joseph Walsh was unconvinced Davis was a genuine clairvoyant. Walsh wrote that although Davis stated that he had only ever read one novel, this was not true as he had read Vestiges of the Natural History of Creation and there was evidence he had read books on sociology.

The spiritualist writings of Davis have been criticized by scientists and skeptics for containing inaccuracies and false information. For example, in one case, Davis seemed unaware that water is a compound of oxygen and hydrogen. Researcher Georgess McHargue pointed out that the supposed "scientific" passages from his writings are filled with "gobbledegook as to put it in the class with the most imaginative vintage science fantasy."
