= Samuel G. Love =

American educator (1821–1893)

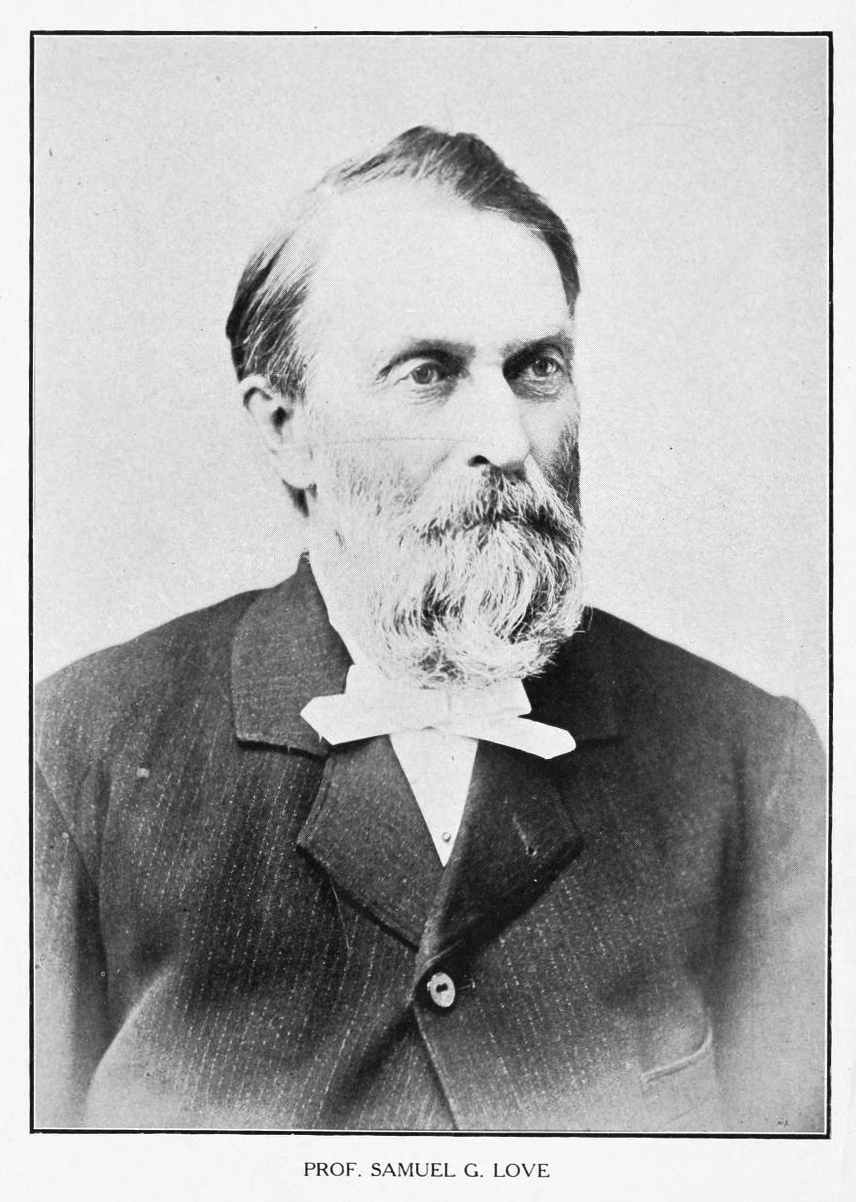

Samuel Gurley Love (30 May 1821-12 November 1893) was an American teacher and educationist. He taught at public schools in Buffalo, Randolph and Jamestown where he was the first principal and superintendent. He was an advocate of all-round education. An elementary school is now named after him.

Love was born in Orleans County, New York where he studied before training in education at Hamilton College. He taught at Buffalo, Randolph and from 1865 at Jamestown. Here he became the first principal of the Jamestown Public Schools. Apart from all round education, he also took an interest in local history, becoming a founder and president of the Chautauqua County Historical Society.

After retiring from the position of principal in 1891, he became a librarian at the James Prendergast Free Library. He was married to Mary Fenn Robinson from 1846 until divorce in 1854. They had two children.
