= Rosedale Cemetery (Orange, New Jersey) =

Cemetery in Essex County, New Jersey, US

Coordinates: 40.789°N 74.223°W

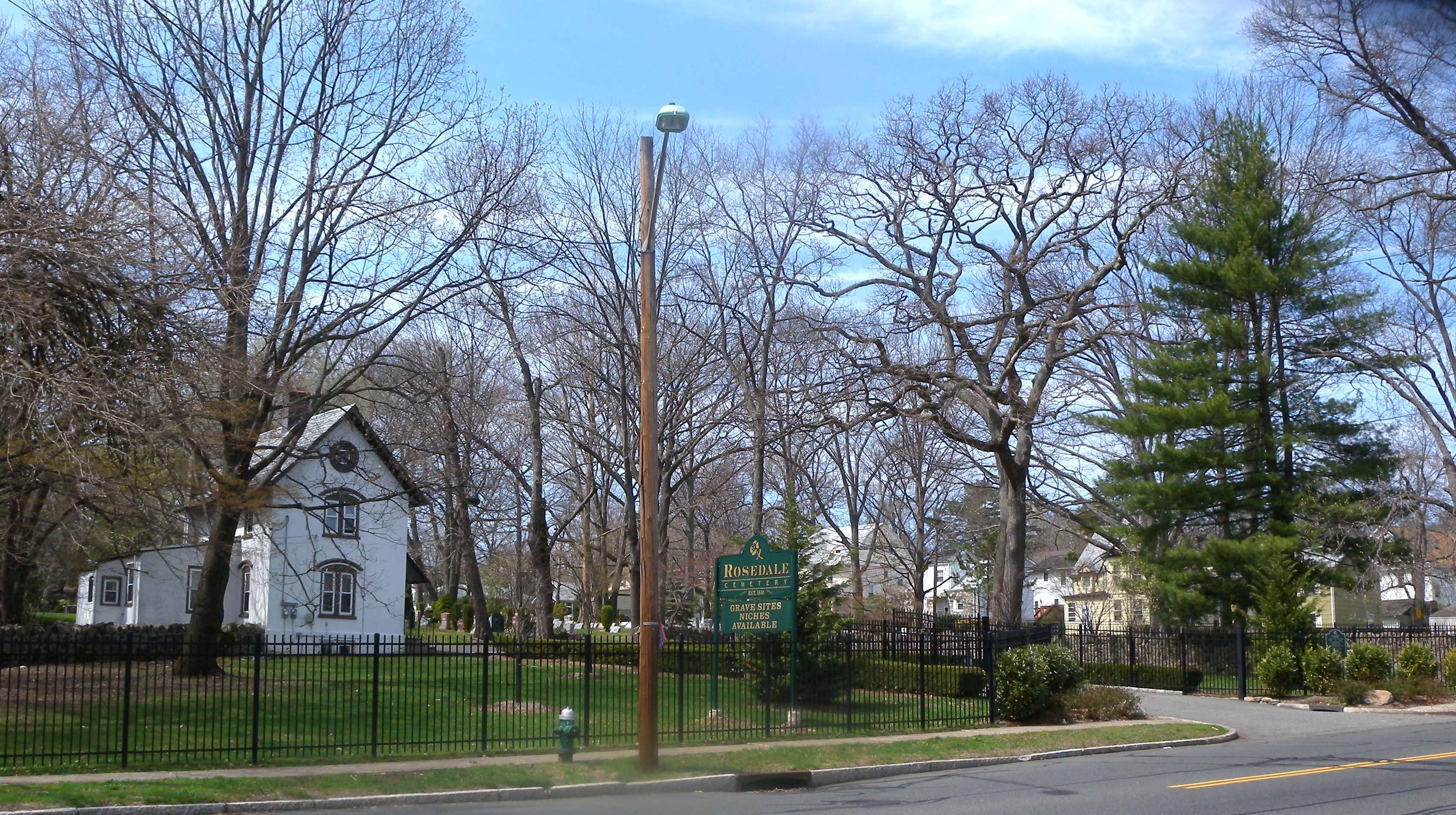
- Interactive map of Rosedale Cemetery

Details
- Established: 1840
- Location: Essex County, New Jersey
- Country: United States
- Type: Non denominational
- Size: 92 acres (370,000 m^{2})
- Website: Official website
- Find a Grave: Rosedale Cemetery

Rosedale Cemetery is a cemetery located at the tripoint of Orange, West Orange and Montclair townships in the Essex County of the U.S. state of New Jersey. Cyrus Baldwin drew up the original plan for the cemetery in 1840.

== Notable interments ==
- Platt Adams (1885–1961), American Olympic athlete and member of the New Jersey State Assembly from Essex County
- Jim Barnes (1886–1966), golfer
- John L. Blake (1831–1899), represented New Jersey's 6th congressional district from 1879 to 1881
- Dudley Buck (1839–1909), organist, composer, and writer
- Samuel Colgate (1822–1897), founder of Colgate-Palmolive
- Lee Crystal (1956-2013), drummer and Rock & Roll Hall of Fame Member
- Mary Fenn Robinson Davis (1824–1886), a spiritualist and feminist who was a poet, author, editor, and lecturer
- Sarah Jane Corson Downs (1822-1891), president, New Jersey Woman's Christian Temperance Union
- Charles Edison (1890–1969), son of Thomas Edison and the 42nd Governor of New Jersey
- Frank Emil Fesq (1840–1920), American Civil War Medal of Honor recipient
- Wilfred J. Funk (1883–1965), lexicographer (Funk & Wagnalls)
- Althea Gibson (1927–2003), the first African American woman to be a competitor on the world tennis tour
- Henry Judd Gray (1892–1928), murderer of Albert Snyder
- George Huntington Hartford (1833–1917), Mayor of Orange, New Jersey, from 1878 to 1890 and owner of The Great Atlantic & Pacific Tea Company, the country's largest food retailer at the time of his death
- Frances Cox Henderson (1820–1897), wife of Governor James Pinckney Henderson of Texas, retired in East Orange, established Good Shepherd home for aged women
- James Curtis Hepburn (1815–1911), physician, philologist, and missionary
- George Inness (1825–1894), painter
- George Inness Jr. (1854–1926), painter
- Julia Goodrich Roswell-Smith Inness (1853–1941), clubwoman
- Frank Louis Kramer (1880–1958), cyclist
- Hazel May Kuser (?–1924), Radium Girl
- Mary Artemisia Lathbury (1841–1913), poet and hymnwriter
- Amelia Maggia (?–1922), Radium Girl
- Lowell Mason (1792–1872), hymn composer and music educator
- Quinta Maggia McDonald (?–1929), Radium Girl
- Charles Follen McKim (1847–1909), architect
- George W. Merck (1894–1957), pharmacist, president of Merck & Co.
- John Pingry (1818–1894), minister, founder of the Pingry School
- Ruth A. Saxer (?–1942), Radium Girl
- George J. Seabury (1844–1909), chemist and pharmacist
- Michelle Thomas (1968–1998), American actress best known for roles in Family Matters and The Cosby Show
- George C. Tichenor (1838–1902), member and president of the Board of General Appraisers
- Aaron B. Tompkins (1844–1931), American Civil War Medal of Honor recipient
- Martha Van Marter (1839-1931), editor and writer
- William A. Wachenfeld (1889 – 1969), Justice of the New Jersey Supreme Court from 1946 to 1959
- George James Webb (1803–1887), composer
- William H. Wiley (1842–1925), represented New Jersey's 8th congressional district from 1909 to 1911
- Earl Williams (1948–2013), professional baseball player
- Three British Commonwealth war servicemen – a Royal Air Force officer and Canadian Army Sergeant of World War I and a Canadian airman of World War II
