= Mary Artemisia Lathbury =

American poet and hymnwriter (1841–1913)

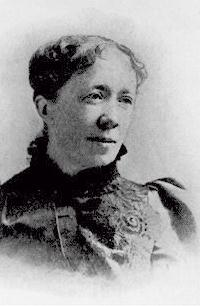
- Born: August 10, 1841
- Died: October 20, 1913 (aged 72)
- Occupation: Writer
- Known for: Poems, hymns

Mary Artemisia Lathbury (August 10, 1841 - October 20, 1913) was an American poet and hymnwriter.

== Early life ==
Lathbury was born on August 10, 1841, in Manchester, New York. Her father and her two brothers were Methodist ministers. As a child, she enjoyed reading, writing, and illustrating poems that she wrote herself. She was originally an artist and also taught art in Vermont and New York schools, but later transitioned more towards religious work and writing. She was the general editor of materials for the Methodist Sunday School. Lathbury said that she became involved with Christian service full-time because God said to her, "Remember, my child, that you have a gift of weaving fancies into verse and a gift with the pencil of producing visions that come to your heart; consecrate these to Me as thoroughly as you do your inmost spirit".

== Career ==
Lathbury has contributed to St. Nicholas, Harper's Young People, and Wide Awake. Her books include Fleda and the Voice, Out of Darkness Into Light, Seven Little Maids, among others. Her hymns include Day is Dying in the West and Break Thou the Bread of Life. She was known as the "Poet Laureate and Saint of Chautauqua".

== Personal life ==
Lathbury had a close friendship spanning many years with the editor, Martha Van Marter.

Lathbury died on October 20, 1913, in East Orange, New Jersey, and was buried at Rosedale Cemetery in the same city.
