= Lewis Locke =

American Civil War Medal of Honor recipient

Lewis Locke aka Louis Tacy
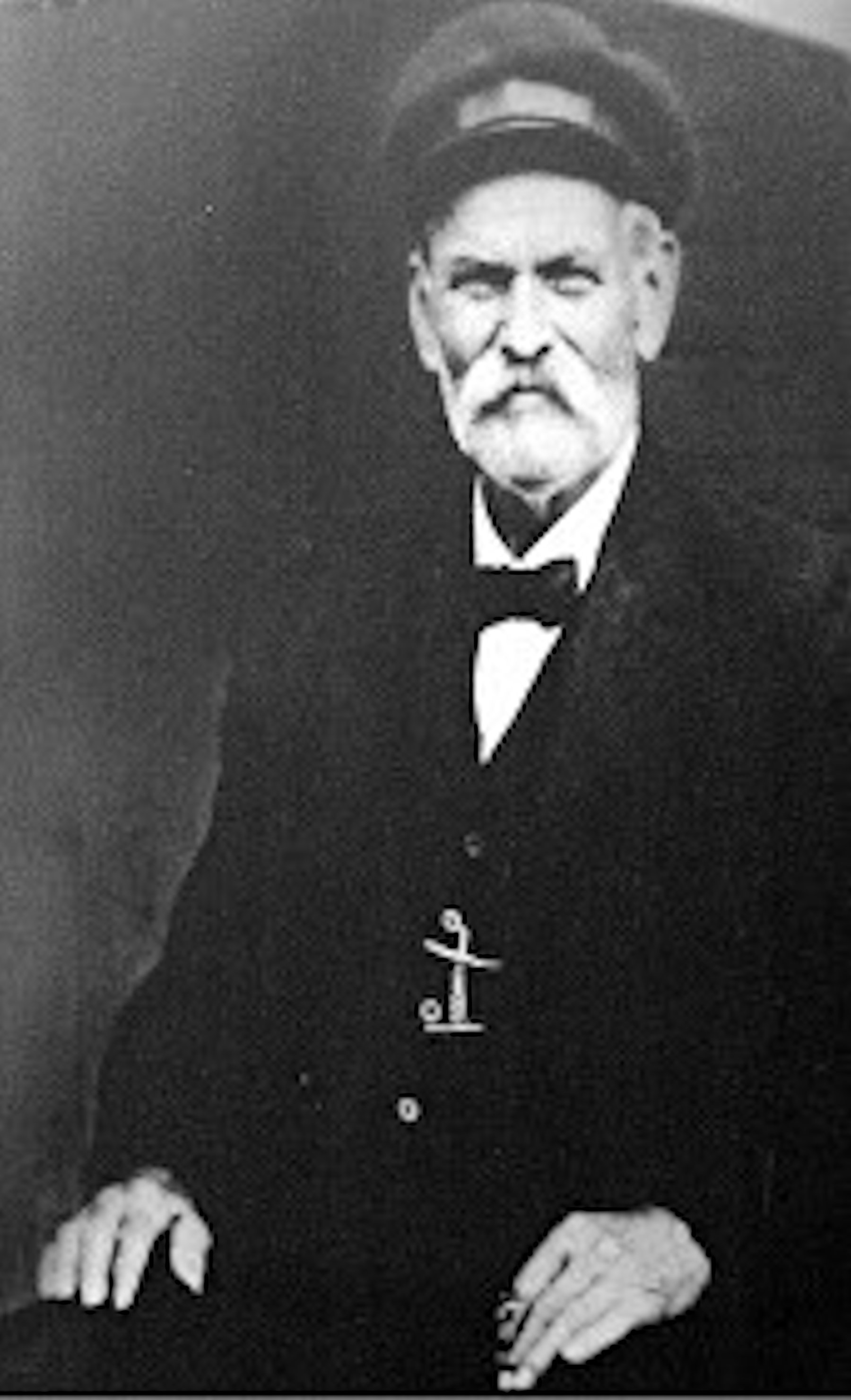
- Lewis Locke aka Louis Tacy c1898
- Born: November 5, 1835; Clintonville, Clinton County, New York
- Died: January 4, 1920 (aged 84); South Hadley, Massachusetts
- Burial place: Northampton, Massachusetts
- Military career
- Allegiance: United States of America; Union
- Branch: United States Army; Union Army
- Service years: 1864 - 1865
- Rank: Private
- Units: Company A, 1st New Jersey Cavalry
- Conflicts: American Civil War
- Awards: Medal of Honor

Lewis Locke (born Louis Tacy) (November 5, 1835 - January 4, 1920) was a Private in the Union Army and a Medal of Honor recipient for his actions in the American Civil War.

Locke joined the 1st New Jersey Cavalry in October 1864, and mustered out with his regiment in July 1865.

== Medal of Honor citation ==
Rank and organization: Private, Company A, 1st New Jersey Cavalry. Place and date: At Paines Crossroads, Va., April 5, 1865. Entered service at: Trenton, N.J. Birth: Clintonville, N.Y. Date of issue: May 3, 1865.

Citation:

Capture of a Confederate flag.

== See also ==
- List of American Civil War Medal of Honor recipients: G–L
