= Mary Fenn Robinson Davis =

Spiritualist lecturer and women's rights advocate (1824–1886)

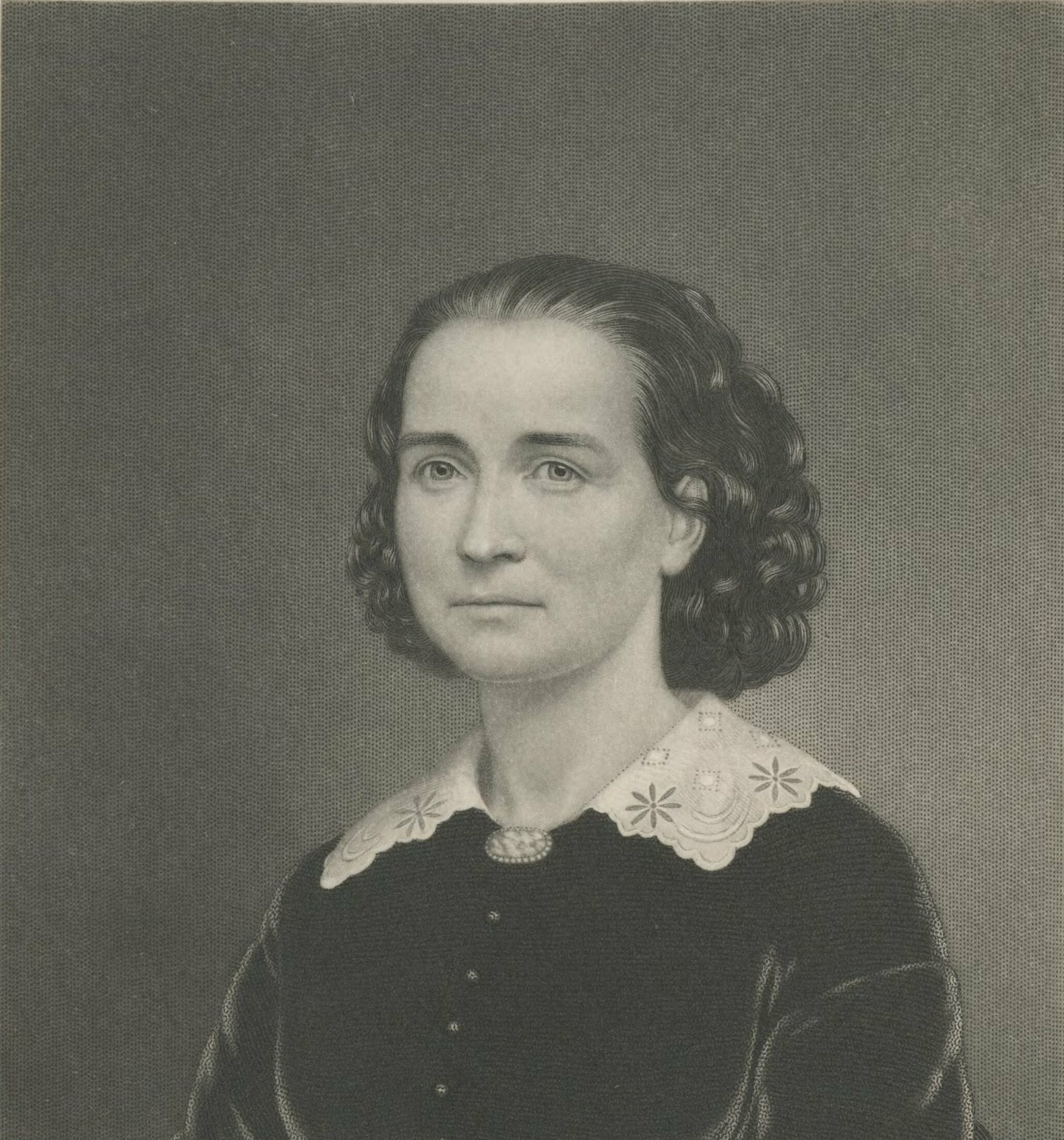
- Engraved by Samuel Sartain from an ambrotype by Isaac Rehn
- Born: Mary Fenn Robinson; July 17, 1824
- Died: July 18, 1886 (aged 62)
- Other names: Mary F. Love; Mary F. Davis; Mary Fenn Davis; Mary Fenn
- Years active: Spiritualist lecturer, poet, and reformer
- Spouses: Samuel G. Love (div. 1854) Andrew Jackson Davis (m. 1855; ann. 1885)

Mary Fenn (Robinson) Davis (1824-1886) was a reformer, spiritualist lecturer, and poet. She was a member of Sorosis, a women's club. She was married several times, first to Samuel G. Love, with whom she had a son. Her marriage to Andrew Jackson Davis after her divorce caused a scandal. She fought against alcohol consumption and slavery and for women's rights.

== Early life ==
Mary Fenn Robinson was born in Clarendon, New York on July 17, 1824. Her parents were farmers Damaris (Fenn) and Chauncey Robinson. They were members of the Baptist church, and Chauncey promoted temperance. Mary went to Le Roy Female Seminary and graduated with honors.

== Marriages and children ==
Mary married Samuel G. Love in 1846 in Buffalo, New York, becoming Mary Fenn Robinson Love. She had two children with her husband, a teacher, Frances and Charles. What had been a happy marriage began to dissolve as Davis became interested in spiritualism and became a medium.

After the Loves heard Andrew Jackson Davis speak about his spiritual experiences at the lecture entitled "Spiritualism, Harmonial Philosophy, and Marriage and Divorce," in 1854, Davis began corresponding with him about spiritualism and the state of her marriage. They believed that they were soul mates. At that time, it was easier to get a divorce in Indiana, and Davis traveled to the state in late 1854 to obtain her divorce. She lived with her parents in Claredon, New York. Her children lived with Samuel G. Love for several years. During that time, Love discovered that the divorce in Indiana did not allow him to remarry. He sued for divorce in the state of New York, declaring that Davis was an adultress, which resulted in a scandal.

Davis married Andrew Davis Robinson on May 15, 1855, and they moved to Orange, New Jersey in 1859. Her husband's sister and her two sons, and his father moved in with the couple. Davis's children, Francis and Charles, moved in with the family in 1865. Francis began working as a teacher and was married in 1871, becoming Francis (Love) Baldwin, and had four children. She died in 1878, after which her children lived with the Davis for ten years. Her daughter's death was difficult for her, but she communicated beyond the veil with her daughter after her daughter's death. Charles worked in Washington, D.C., for the government.

Andrew graduated from United States Medical College in 1883. He left Davis to live in Watertown, Massachusetts and their marriage was annulled by the New York Supreme Court in 1885. Andrew believed that he was mistaken in his belief that he and Davis had been soul mates when they married in 1855.

== Lecture curcuit ==
Before her marriage to Andrew, Davis spoke about temperance. She was a talented speaker about spiritualism in New York, Ohio, and Pennsylvania. From the year of their marriage to Davis until 1858, Davis and her husband lectured about the "harmonial philosophy" in the midwestern and northern United States. Davis spoke about her personal beliefs about spiritualism. There were differing opinions about trances. Davis lectured that "it is an abuse of Spiritualism to yield up selfhood in the absorbing investigation of the phenomena."

== Poet and writer ==
Davis continued to write poetry and articles about equal rights for women, spirituality, and temperance beginning in 1852. Her works were initially published in the Spiritual Telegraph (New York) until 1859. The Davises worked in the New York City area. Andrew edited the paper Herald of Progress, which published Davis's poems and articles about spiritualism and its role in improving social concerns. Davis also edited the paper circulated from 1860 to 1864. She contributed to the Banner of Light (Boston) from 1855 to 1886. Her works include "Danger Signals: An Address on the Uses and Abuses of Modern Spiritualism" (1875) and "Death in the Light of the Harmonial Philosophy" (1876).

== Feminist ==
There was often a correlation between women spiritualists and feminists, like Victoria Woodhull and Caroline Healey Dall. Davis expressed her beliefs that women should be treated as men. She said, "If a woman be a human being, then she is entitled to consideration as an absolute entity — an individual, responsible, immortal being."

In the late 1860s, the couple were founding members and officers of the New Jersey Woman Suffrage Association. Davis was a member of local women's suffrage groups and Sorosis.

== Educator ==
Davis and Andrew founded the Children's Progressive Lyceum in 1863. They led a nationwide movement for spiritualist Sunday schools.

== Later life and death ==
After her divorce from Andrew, she became frail from cancer. Davis went by the name Mary Fenn, using her mother's maiden surname. She died on July 18, 1886, at her home in West Orange, New Jersey, and was buried at Rosedale Cemetery.
