= Martha Van Marter =

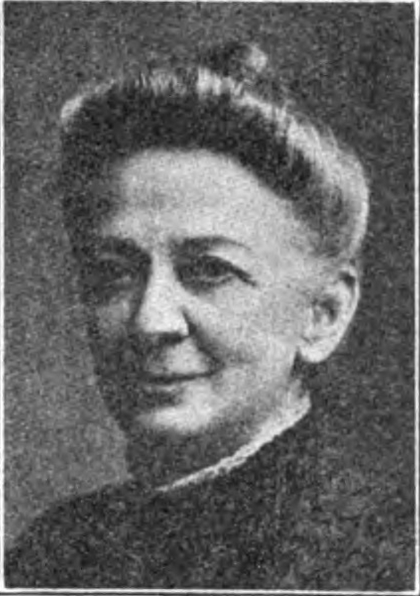
- Van Marter in a 1920 publication
- Born: December 31, 1839; Lyons, New York, U.S.
- Died: December 12, 1931 (aged 91); Ocean Grove, New Jersey, U.S.
- Resting place: Rosedale Cemetery
- Education: Genesee Wesleyan Seminary
- Occupations: Magazine editor; writer
- Partner: Mary Artemisia Lathbury
- Writing career
- Genre: Christian literature
- Notable work: Bible symbols

Martha Van Marter (December 31, 1839 – December 12, 1931) was an American editor and writer associated with the Methodist Episcopal Church (MEC). She was a prominent figure in Sunday school and home missionary publishing, working for decades as an editor of church periodicals. Beginning her editorial career in 1876, she contributed to and later led several publications, including The Sunday School Advocate, The Picture Lesson Paper, Children's Home Missions, and Woman's Home Missions. She authored numerous stories and articles for church papers, as well as several books for children and Sunday school teachers. Born in New York, Van Marter lived and worked primarily in New Jersey, where she also taught and engaged in activities with the Woman's Home Missionary Society (WHMS) and the Woman's Christian Temperance Union (WCTU).

== Early life and education ==
Martha Van Marter was born on a farm in Lyons, New York, December 31, 1839, the youngest of ten siblings. Her parents were Gilbert and Sarah Van Marter. Her mother died when Martha was a young child.

As a child, Van Marter was drawn to the books in her father's library, and especially toward Pilgrim's Progress, which seemed to her lively imagination a story of real happenings. By means of this old classic, she taught herself to read, so that when she entered district school, she was put at once into the Third Reader. Though the great majority of the volumes were above her head, she read them nevertheless, finding her chief delight in biography. She could not know then that this was to be the foundation for years of editorial and literary work, and that she herself would supply in books and periodicals some of the literature for children of a later generation. Before she was fourteen, she was sent to a boarding school, graduating from Genesee Wesleyan Seminary before she was eighteen.

Her religious training was obtained in the MEC, of which her parents were members, and in which her father was a leader.

== Career ==
After graduation, Van Marter taught in district schools and later in seminaries for girls, her teaching interrupted by a year abroad, with special study in France. As a teacher of a primary class of a 150 students in Orange, New Jersey, she visited the children's parents who were factory workers. Frequently, they lived in dire poverty. Some of the families were not afflicted with poverty or illness, but yearned for friendship. Many needed the help that religion could bring them. She did this after hours of editorial work. This was the beginning of home missionary work for Van Marter. Some of the students of her teaching days followed Van Marter into home missionary work.

About this time, Van Marter began a friendship which was a great factor in her life, that with the author and hymn writer, Mary Artemisia Lathbury. Up to the time that Lathbury died, they made their home together. It was through Lathbury's introduction that Van Marter was asked to teach in Drew Ladies' Seminary (later, Drew Seminary for Young Women), in Carmel, New York. In 1876, she followed Lathbury as editor of the "Bay Window" page on the old Sunday School Advocate. This editorial work was unsought; every position Van Marter held came to her unsolicited, as a tribute to her ability and efficiency.

When the WHMS was started (1880), Van Marter joined at once, impelled by the need for such work which had tugged at her in the slums of her own city. She was the first secretary of New York Conference Society and at her own expense, traveled over the Conference territory, organizing about fifty auxiliaries in the local churches.

Until 1896, Van Marter was connected with the Sunday school editorial department of the MEC, editing The Picture Lesson Paper and having much to do with The Sunday School Journal, especially along the lines of help for primary grade teachers, on which she could write with the authority of personal experience. Many editorials in the Journal came from Van Marter, and for a number of years, she was editor of The Sunday School Advocate.

In 1896, Van Marter was made editor of the new home missionary paper for children, Children's Home Missions, which grew under her editorship from small beginnings to a readable, live periodical, read monthly by thousands of children. For several years, she conducted departments on Woman's Home Missions and had much to do with its management.

At the Annual Meeting of the WHMS in 1901, at New York, Harriet C. McCabe resigned her position as editor of Woman's Home Missions. Eighteen volumes of the paper, from January 1884, to December 1901, bore the imprint of her name. Upon the floor of the Convention, McCabe asked the privilege of nominating her successor, Martha Van Marter, who was unanimously elected as editor of Woman's Home Missions. Though aware that her appointment was a possibility, it had not occurred to Van Marter that it might be made so public a procedure, and when summoned to the platform, Van Marter walked up stunned. Van Marter had for six years been serving as editor of Children's Home Missions, and came to both positions with the qualifications that resulted from a long experience of exclusive devotion to literary work and sympathy with the aims of the WHMS. Woman's Home Missions had from its beginning a record of encouraging increase in subscriptions. Neither publisher nor editor ever felt quite satisfied with the advance in a given year, even though there was steady increase from year to year while Van Marter was the editor. At the annual meeting of the WHMS in 1916, held in Columbus, Ohio, Van Marter's resignation was announced and her successor, Mrs. Levi Gilbert, introduced.

Bible symbols

Many of Van Marter's stories and articles appeared in the Church papers; she has served for years on the press committee of the annual meetings of the WHMS and she was the author of several books for children and Sunday school teachers. These included Jessie in Switzerland, The Primary Teacher, and Bible Studies, among others.

At the same time as Van Marter began her activities with the WHMS, she was actively connected with the WCTU of Orange, New Jersey, holding no office on account of her other work, but taking an active place on committees and finding her particular interest in the evangelistic services held on Sunday afternoons, where hundreds were converted. The Charities Society of Orange claimed her attention, too, and she was one of the dozen founders of this organization, which was one of the first of its kind. All this was done in addition to her editorial work, which she never gave up.

== Death ==
After a prolonged illness, Martha Van Marter died at the WHMS's Bancroft-Taylor Rest Home in Ocean Grove, New Jersey, on December 12, 1931, with interment at Rosedale Cemetery, in Orange, New Jersey.

== Selected works ==
- Bible symbols; designed and arranged to stimulate a greater interest in the study of the Bible by both young and old (with Frank Beard), 1904 (text)
- Called to the colors (Council of Women for Home Missions, 1919)
- Jessie in Switzerland, 1875 (text)
- Light for the Little Ones (Phillips & Hunt, 1879)
- The Ministry of Service, 1917
- The Primary Teacher: With Helps and Exercises, 1893 (text)
