= William B. Hooper =

American Civil War Medal of Honor recipient

- Born: 1841; Willimantic, Connecticut, US
- Died: 1870 (aged 28–29); Caldera, Chile
- Burial place: Windham, Connecticut, US
- Military career
- Allegiance: United States
- Branch: United States Army
- Rank: Corporal
- Units: Company L, 1st New Jersey Volunteer Cavalry
- Conflicts: American Civil War
- Awards: Medal of Honor

William B. Hooper (1841 – January 16, 1870) was a Union Army soldier in the American Civil War who received the U.S. military's highest decoration, the Medal of Honor.

Hooper was born in Willimantic, Connecticut. He was awarded the Medal of Honor for extraordinary heroism shown on March 31, 1865, while serving as a corporal with Company L, 1st New Jersey Volunteer Cavalry, at Chamberlains Creek, Virginia. His Medal of Honor was issued on July 3, 1865.

He died at the age of 29, on January 16, 1870, in Caldera, Chile. An "In Memory Of" government-issued headstone is in the family plot at the Old Willimantic Cemetery in Windham, Connecticut. His exact burial location is unknown.

== Medal of Honor citation ==
The President of the United States of America, in the name of Congress, takes pleasure in presenting the Medal of Honor to Corporal William B. Hooper, United States Army, for extraordinary heroism on 31 March 1865, while serving with Company L, 1st New Jersey Cavalry, in action at Chamberlain's Creek, Virginia. With the assistance of a comrade, Corporal Hooper headed off the advance of the enemy, shooting two of his Color Bearers; also posted himself between the enemy and the lead horses of his own command, thus saving the herd from capture.
