= 1st New Jersey Cavalry Regiment =

The 1st New Jersey Cavalry Regiment was a Union Army regiment from the U.S. state of New Jersey that participated in the American Civil War.

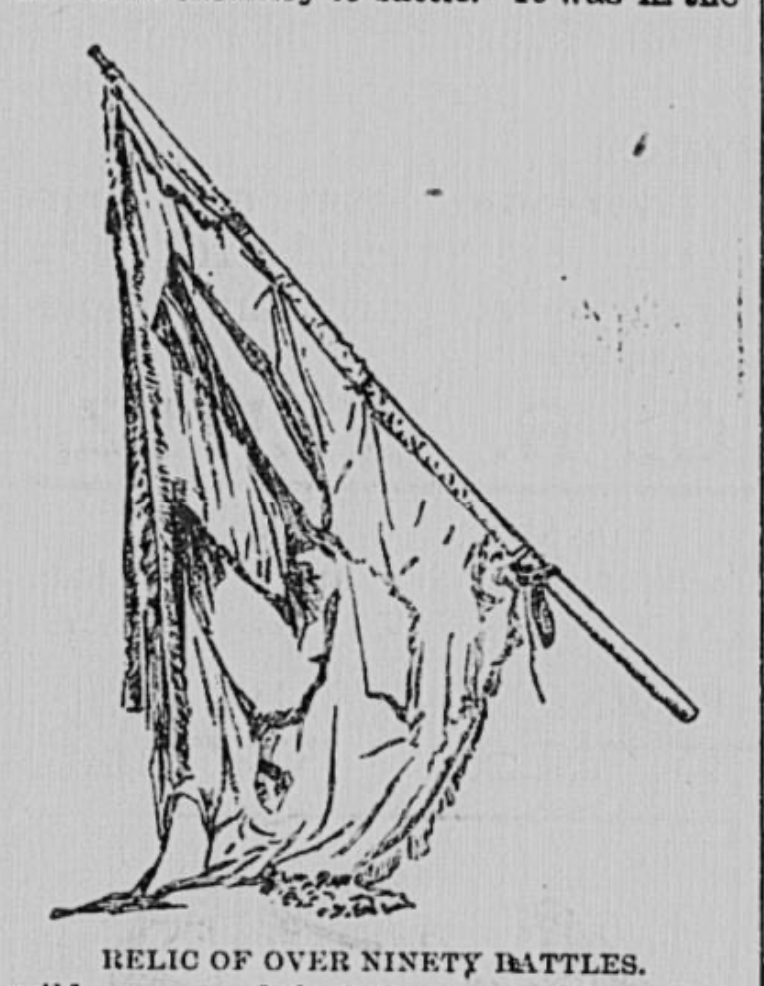
Regimental flag

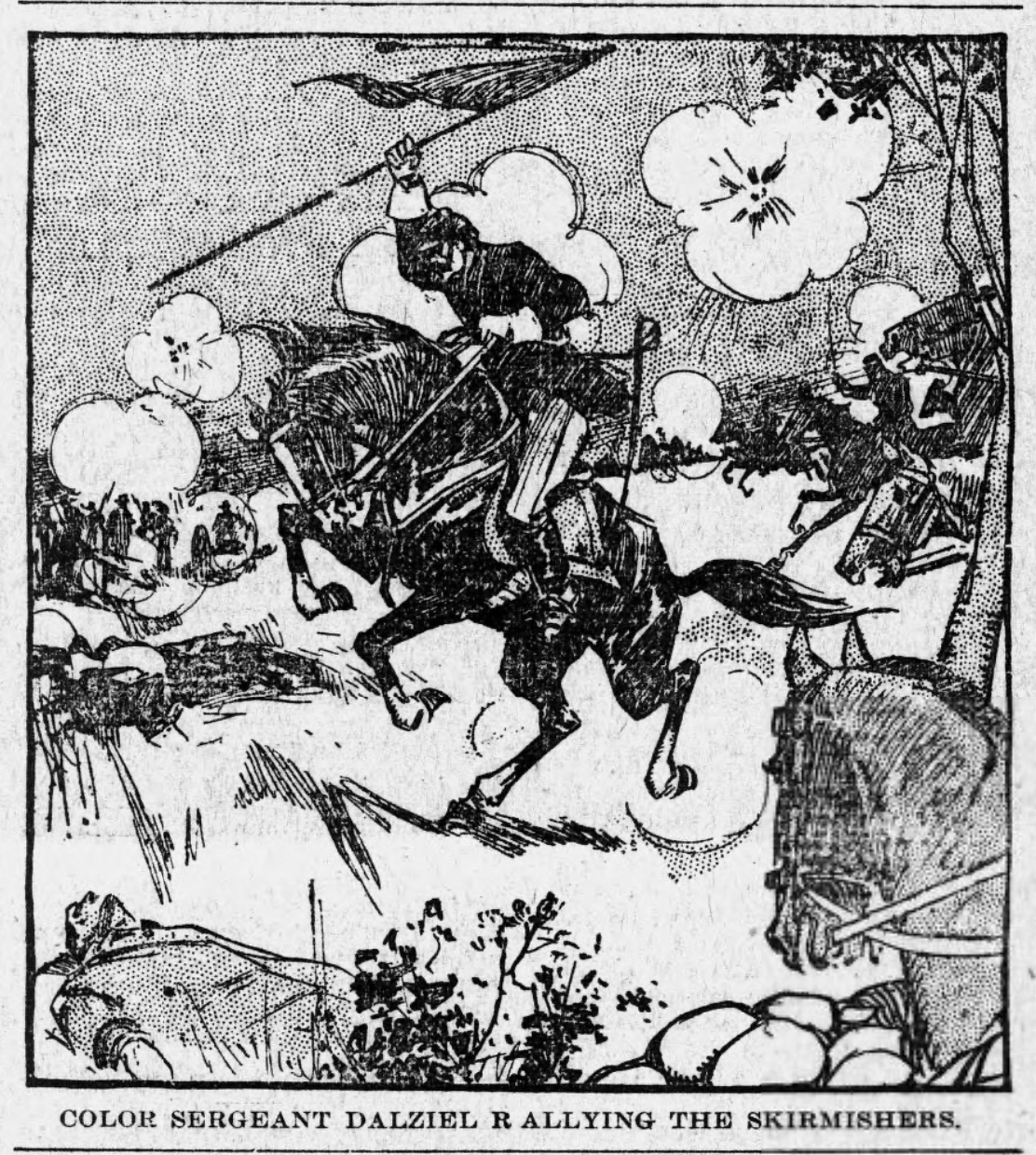
Sargent James Dalziel carrying the regimental flag during the Battle of the Wilderness, 1864

== Organization and unit history ==
The 1st New Jersey Cavalry Regiment was organized at Trenton, New Jersey, under authority of the United States Department of War on August 14, 1861, by William Halstead, a former congressman who served as first Colonel of the regiment.

The regiment was mustered out at Cloud's Hills, Virginia, on July 24, 1865.

== Medal of Honor recipients ==
Twelve enlisted soldiers of the regiment performed actions which later earned them the Medal of Honor. These men included:

- Sgt. James T. Clancy, C Company - Vaughan Road, 1 October 1864
- Cpl. William B. Hooper, L Company - Chamberlain's Creek, 31 March 1865
- Pvt. Lewis Locke, A Company - Paine's Crossroads, 5 April 1865
- Sgt. William Porter, H Company - Sayler's Creek, 6 April 1865
- Sgt. John C. Sagelhurst, B Company - Hatcher's Run, 6 February 1865
- Sgt. David Southard, C Company - Sayler's Creek, 6 April 1865
- 1st Sgt. George W. Stewart, E Company - Paine's Crossroads, 5 April 1865
- Pvt. Christian Streile, I Company - Paine's Crossroads, 5 April 1865
- Sgt. Charles Titus, H Company - Sayler's Creek, 6 April 1865
- Sgt. Aaron B. Tompkins, G Company - Sayler's Creek, 5 April 1865
- Sgt. Charles E. Wilson, A Company - Sayler's Creek, 6 April 1865
- Sgt. John Wilson, L Company - Chamberlain's Creek, 31 March 1865

== Casualties ==
During its service it lost 12 Officers and 116 Enlisted men killed and mortally wounded and 4 Officers and 185 Enlisted men by disease; for a total of 317.

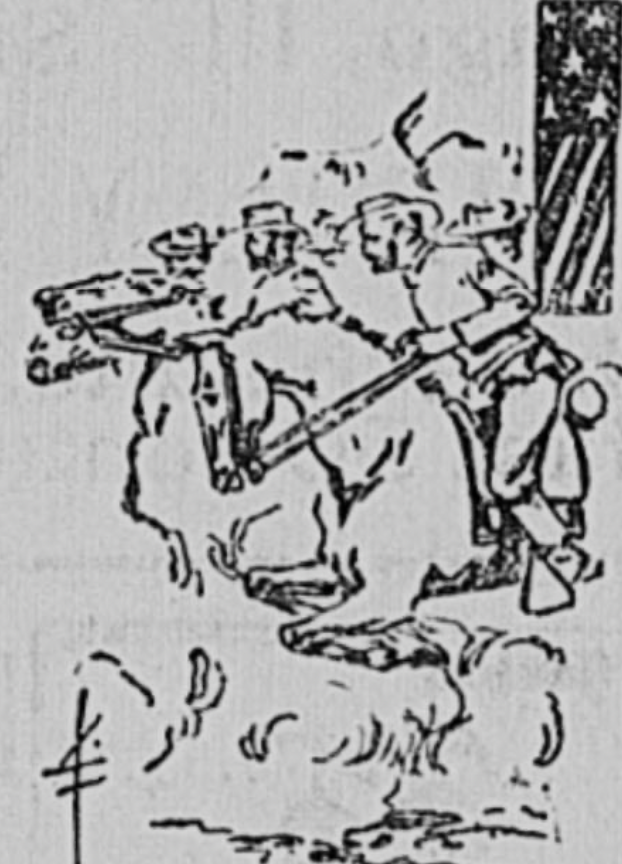
1893 Illustration of the regiment's men charging

== Successor unit ==
The 102nd Cavalry Regiment, part of the New Jersey Army National Guard, was originally designated the 1st New Jersey Cavalry Regiment. It was composed of existing cavalry troops throughout the state when it was established in 1913. While it is informally considered to be the successor to the 1st New Jersey Volunteer Cavalry, the official lineage was not carried over due to the nearly half-century lapse in regimental structure.

== See also ==
- List of New Jersey Civil War Units
