= List of weapons in the American Civil War =

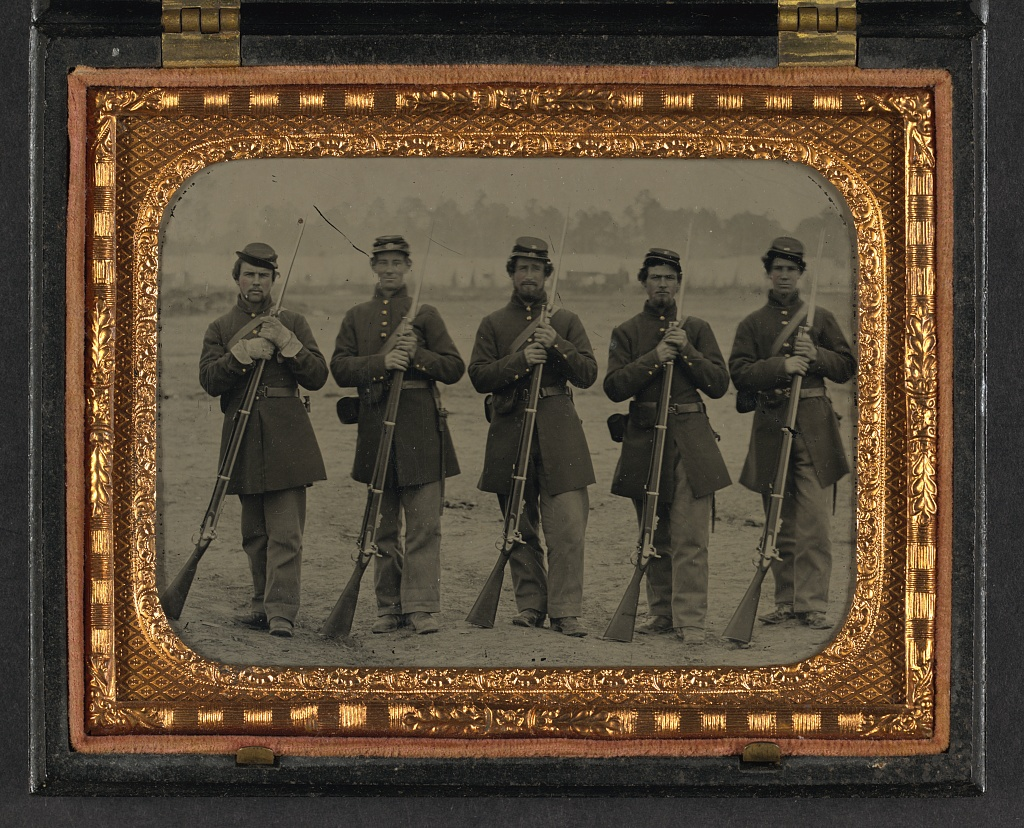
Muzzleloaders dominated the battlefields of the Civil War, being used by both sides in hundreds of thousands. The bayonets attached to the guns were an important force multiplier during the war.

There were a wide variety of weapons used during the American Civil War, especially in the early days as both the Union and Confederate armies struggled to arm their rapidly-expanding forces. Everything from antique flintlock firearms to early examples of machine guns and sniper rifles saw use to one extent or the other. However, the most common weapon to be used by Northern and Southern soldiers was the rifled musket. Born from the development of the percussion cap and the Minié ball, rifled muskets had much greater range than smoothbore muskets while being easier to load than previous rifles.

Most firearms were muzzleloaders which were armed by pouring the gunpowder and bullet down the muzzle. While they only fired once before needing to be reloaded, a trained soldier could achieve a rate of fire of three rounds per minute. Newer breechloaders were easier and quicker to reload, but perhaps the most revolutionary development were repeating firearms, which could fire multiple times before reloading. However, for a number of reasons, repeating firearms did not see widespread use.

The diversity of long guns in the war led to a classification system which categorized them by their quality and effectiveness. There were "first class" weapons like Springfield rifles, "second class" weapons like the older M1841 Mississippi rifle, and "third class" weapons like the Springfield Model 1842 musket. Efforts were made to ensure that troops had the best possible firearms available, including rearming with captured enemy weapons after a battle.

== Personal weapons ==
=== Melee weapons ===
The most common melee weapon carried by both sides was the bayonet given to infantry soldiers. Beyond its use as a weapon, the bayonet had utilitarian purposes, such as a makeshift entrenching tool and even a spit. Infantry sergeants and officers were also equipped with a sword. Sabers were the traditional weapon of the cavalry, although Union cavalry tended to place greater emphasis on their use in combat over the Confederates. Another traditional cavalry weapon, the lance, was very rare: the 6th Pennsylvania Cavalry Regiment was one of the only units to carry them, and they eventually discarded their lances in May 1863.

One weapon which saw an unexpected revival during the Civil War was the pike. The Confederacy in particular suffered from a shortage of modern weapons, and by 1862 prominent military leaders like Robert E. Lee and Stonewall Jackson advocated the manufacture and distribution of pikes as a stopgap measure. Joseph E. Brown, governor of Georgia, was the strongest proponent of pikes and procured thousands of them for local state militia. Such weapons were primarily given to home guard units until they could be rearmed with guns.

Model	Notes for the subject
Arkansas toothpick	Could be used as a short sword in combat
Bayonet	Attached to rifles and muskets
Bowie knife	Often carried by Confederates instead of bayonets
M1832 foot artillery sword	Issued to artillerymen, based on the Roman gladius
M1833 dragoon saber	Issued to the US Cavalry. An engraved version was privately purchased by senior officers.
M1840 army noncommissioned officer's sword	Issued to infantry sergeants
M1840 cavalry saber	Issued to Union cavalry
M1840 light artillery saber	Issued to mounted artillery
M1850 army staff & field officer's sword	Regulation officer's sword, though in practice most officers used cavalry sabers. Southern officers sometimes carried ancestral blades from the American Revolutionary War or even from the War of 1812.
M1852 naval officer's sword	
M1860 cutlass	Issued to naval boarding parties. Sailors also had access to harpoons, axes and grappling hooks.
M1860 light cavalry saber	Issued to Union cavalry
Mameluke sword	Carried by Marine officers
Hatchet	Issued to mounted riflemen from the elite Lightning Brigade
USMC noncommissioned officer's sword	
Jeb Stuart with a cavalry saber M1832 artillery sword M1850 regulation infantry officer's sword M1860 light cavalry saber Mameluke sword (top) and scabbard (bottom)

=== Sidearms ===
Many different pistols and revolvers were used in the Civil War, although the most common were cap and ball revolvers with five or six chambers. The most popular revolvers were those produced by Colt, with over 146,000 purchased by the US government. The bullet and gunpowder could be packaged together as a paper cartridge or loaded separately into each chamber. Some models also came with a shoulder stock.

Revolvers were the standard sidearm of infantry officers; many soldiers also brought with them handguns when they first volunteered, but these were often discarded to reduce weight. Nearly all cavalry soldiers carried at least one handgun but more frequently two. John Mosby's rangers were famous for carrying four revolvers, with the additional pair held in saddle holsters.

Model	Notes
Adams M1851 revolver	A double-action only revolver and predecessor to the Beaumont–Adams M1862.
Allen & Thurber M1837 revolver pepperbox	With the shortage of pistols in the American Civil War, many soldiers on both sides carried these as a backup arm.
Allen & Wheelock M1861 revolver	
Beaumont–Adams M1862 revolver	Imported by both the Union and the Confederacy
Butterfield M1855 transitional revolver	A transitional revolver with tape primer invented in 1855 by Jesse Butterfield of Philadelphia. Two thousand were ordered by the US Army, but production was canceled in 1862.
Colt M1836 Paterson revolver	The first true revolver produced by Colt in 1836.
Colt M1847 Walker revolver	Issued to the US Cavalry. A heavy .44 caliber revolver invented during the Mexican War and designed for killing the mounts of charging enemy troopers.
Colt M1848 Dragoon revolver	A .44 caliber revolver that was developed from the Colt M1847 Walker
Colt M1849 Pocket revolver	A popular revolver that was never officially issued but was often bought privately.
Colt M1851 Navy revolver	Colt's most popular revolver for the 1850s civilian market in .36 caliber. The name 'Navy' came from the cylinder of the revolvers being engraved with a scene of the victory of the Second Texas Navy at the Battle of Campeche on May 16, 1843. The preferred sidearm of the Confederacy, copies such as the Griswold & Gunnison were made all over the South.
Colt M1860 Army revolver	A .44 caliber revolver made for the US Cavalry to replace the heavier Colt M1848 Dragoon. The Bessemer steel process invented in the 1850s made a lighter stronger revolver in .44 caliber possible.
Colt M1861 Navy revolver	Updated version of the .36 caliber Colt M1851 Navy with lines similar to the Colt M1860 Army
Colt M1862 Police revolver	The .36 caliber Colt M1862 originally made for the New York Metropolitan Police Department
Colt Root M1855 revolver	The first of Colt's revolvers to use a "creeping" loading lever mechanism
Deringer M1825 Philadelphia caplock pistol	
Elgin M1838 cutlass caplock pistol	Issued to navy personnel but proved unpopular and was quickly replaced with the M1860 cutlass
Harpers Ferry M1836 pistol	A single shot horse pistol predominantly used by the Confederacy
Kerr M1855 revolver	A five shot back-action revolver made by the London Armoury Company was used by Confederate cavalry.
Lefaucheux M1854 revolver	A pinfire revolver imported from France by Union and Confederate officers
Lefaucheux M1858 revolver	
LeMat M1856 revolver	Perhaps the most well known foreign designed revolver during the Civil War. It had two barrels, a .42 caliber barrel on top and a 20 gauge shotgun barrel underneath. The creator, a French doctor living in New Orleans named Jean Alexandre LeMat, moved back to France to create more revolvers for the Confederacy. The French-made revolvers, however, proved unreliable and difficult to manufacture.
Moore M1864 revolver	A seven shot revolver firing the .32 teat-fire cartridge
Remington M1858 revolver	Colt's chief competitor, the Remington Repeating Arms Company, also made revolvers during the Civil War. The most common was the Remington M1858 New Army in .44 caliber. The .36 caliber version referred to as the Remington M1858 New Navy.
Remington M1860 Elliot revolver pepperbox	
Savage-North M1861 Navy revolver	A proto double-action revolver with a second trigger underneath the first was used by the Navy and a few Army regiments.
Smith & Wesson Model 1	Used as an alternative to the Colt and Remington revolvers. These usually fired brass rimfire cartridges.
Smith & Wesson Model No. 2 Army	A larger version of the Smith & Wesson Model 1 chambered in .32 caliber rimfire
Spiller & Burr M1861 revolver	A cheaper version of the Whitney M1857 with a frame made from gunmetal (bronze) instead of iron and the steel in the cylinder was replaced with twisted iron. The muzzle was also rounded instead of having sharp edges.
Starr M1858 and M1863 revolver	A double-action revolver which was briefly used in the western theater of the war, until the U.S. Ordnance Department persuaded Starr Arms Co. to create a single-action variant after the discontinuation of the Colt revolver. The company eventually complied, and the Union acquired 25,000 of the single-action revolvers for $12 each.
Tranter M1856 revolver	The first model also had a proto double-action with a second trigger underneath the first. But in a later model this was reduced to a single trigger that could work with both single-action and double-action.
Volcanic M1855 repeating pistol	This was a lever-action repeating pistol made in 1855 and chambered in .44 rimfire that was privately owned by those who could afford them.
Walch M1859 revolver	A very rare 12 shot revolver, fewer than 200 were made
Wesson and Leavitt M1850 Dragoon revolver	A large single-action revolver in .40 caliber
Whitney M1857 revolver	First produced in 1857, this .36 caliber percussion revolver was the first to be produced with a solid frame, which meant that it was much sturdier than the traditional Colt revolver.
Allen & Thurber M1837 revolver pepperbox Allen & Wheelock M1861 Navy revolver and Allen & Wheelock M1861 Army revolver Beaumont–Adams M1862 revolver Colt M1836 Paterson, Colt M1847 Walker, and Colt M1848 Dragoon revolvers Colt M1849 Pocket revolver Colt M1851 Navy revolver Colt M1860 Army revolver Colt M1861 Navy revolver Colt Root M1855 revolver Deringer M1825 Philadelphia caplock pistol used by John Wilkes Booth to assassinate Abraham Lincoln Elgin M1838 cutlass caplock pistol Lefaucheux M1854 revolver Lefaucheux M1858 revolver LeMat M1856 revolver Moore M1864 revolver Remington M1858 revolver Remington M1860 Elliot revolver pepperbox Smith & Wesson Model 1 Starr M1858 DA revolver Volcanic M1855 repeating pistol

=== Carbines ===
Carbines were the preferred long gun for cavalry as they were smaller, lighter and more robust than infantry rifles. While accuracy was comparable, their range was lower on account of their shorter barrels and lighter gunpower loads. Early models had been muzzleloaders, but because of the difficulty reloading them on horseback, the majority during the war were breechloaders employing linen cartridges. The largest number of these was the Sharps carbine, which was also available as a rifle.

As the war progressed, increasing numbers of Federal cavalrymen were armed with repeating carbines. The most widespread of these was the Spencer carbine, which was adopted as the Union cavalry's official carbine in 1864. However, since the South was incapable of producing the metallic cartridges necessary for their function, Confederate troopers were severely limited in their use of repeating firearms. As late as 1863, the British officer Arthur Lyon Fremantle observed Confederate cavalry in Texas armed with a wide variety of weapons: rifles, shotguns, carbines and revolvers.

Model	Notes
Burnside M1855 carbine	A breech-loader invented by Ambrose Burnside and issued to the US Cavalry
Colt revolver carbine	The Colt M1855 was an early repeater that was not favored by the troops because it tended to discharge all of its cartridges at the same time.
Enfield P1861 musketoon	
Gallager M1861 carbine	A single-shot breech-loading carbine with 17,782 sold to the US Army
Henry repeating rifle	The Civil War precursor to the Winchester repeating rifle based on early lever-action repeating rifles made by New Haven Arms Company Co. These highly prized weapons were privately purchased by those who could afford them.
Jenks M1841 Mule ear carbine	
Joslyn carbine	The Joslyn was made in both percussion and rimfire configurations.
M1814 Blunderbuss	Although considered obsolete by the 1860s, cap and ball blunderbusses were issued in limited numbers to the US Navy, including a brass swivel gun designed by John Dahlgren for the fighting top of ships of the line such as the USS Constitution.
Maynard M1851 carbine	
Merrill M1858 carbine	
Remington M1865 split breech carbine	Issued in limited numbers to Union cavalry in the final year of the war
Sharps carbine	The Sharps carbine was a falling-block firearm used during and after the American Civil War. The carbine version was very popular with the cavalry of both the Union and Confederate armies and was issued in much larger numbers than the full-length rifle.
Sharps & Hankins M1862 carbine	Carbines manufactured for the navy that were made with a protective leather barrel cover
Smith carbine	Patented by Gilbert Smith in 1857
Spencer repeating carbine	The Spencer M1860 was a manually operated lever-action repeating carbine fed from a tube magazine with cartridges. A shorter and lighter version of the Spencer rifle, it was adopted by the Union Army's cavalry in 1864.
Springfield M1847 musketoon	
Starr carbine	
Tarpley carbine	A Southern breech-loader which was not widely produced due to mechanical flaws
Wesson carbine	The Wesson M1859 was a breech-loading, metallic rimfire cartridge rifle used during the American Civil War and the Indian Wars. The carbine was used by US Cavalry, typically purchased by state governments or individuals.
Burnside M1855 carbine Colt M1855 revolver carbine Enfield P1861 musketoon Gallager M1861 carbine Henry M1860 repeating rifle Joslyn M1864 carbine Sharps M1863 carbine Spencer M1860 repeating carbine Tarpley M1863 carbine

=== Rifles and muskets ===
Over 100 types of muskets, rifles, and rifled muskets were used in the Civil War, though the two most common were the Springfield Model 1861 and Pattern 1853 Enfield. Rifled muskets had a significantly longer range than the older smoothbore types, but their accuracy at these distances was limited: gunpowder created billowing clouds of obscuring smoke and the bullet's high trajectory required accurately estimating the distance to the target, a difficult proposition for an untrained shooter.

Some soldiers preferred to stick with smoothbore muskets as it allowed them to fire buck and ball shots. The combination of a bullet with several buckshot was devastating at short distance, but rifled firearms could not use them as they damaged the spiral groves. Thus, even as rifled muskets became more available, some regiments kept their smoothbores; the 12th New Jersey for example carried theirs for the duration of the war.

Although breechloading and repeating rifles were available as early as 1861, few were issued for reasons such as cost, technical complexity, and institutional resistance. This did not stop some individuals from purchasing these weapons themselves. One of the most famous examples of this was the Lightning Brigade, whose wealthy commander, Colonel John T. Wilder, purchased Spencer repeating rifles for the entire formation.

Model	Notes
Augustin M1842 musket	The Augustin was an Austrian musket that featured in the U.S. Civil War in very small numbers.
Ballard M1861 rifle	
Brunswick rifle	A British percussion rifle imported in small numbers by the Confederacy
Charleville musket	French muskets converted to percussion cap from flintlock and used in small numbers
Colt revolver rifle	The Colt was an early repeater that was not favored by the troops because it tended to discharge all of its cartridges at the same time.
Deringer M1814 Common rifle	
Deringer M1817 Common rifle	
Pattern 1853 Enfield	The Enfield rifle was used by both the North and the South in the American Civil War and was the second most widely used infantry weapon in the war.
Fayetteville rifle	
Hall rifle	A few of these single-shot breech-loaders invented in 1811 were used by the Confederacy.
Harper Ferry M1803 rifle	
Hawken rifle	A frontier rifle used by Confederate sharpshooters
Henry M1860 repeating rifle	The Civil War precursor to the Winchester repeating rifle based on early lever-action repeating rifles made by New Haven Arms Company Co. These highly prized weapons were privately purchased by those who could afford them.
Joslyn rifle	The Joslyn was made in both percussion and rimfire configurations.
Lorenz rifle	This Austrian firearm was the third most common rifled musket and imported by both sides. Many were modified to fire the same .58 caliber Minié ball as the Enfield and Springfield rifled muskets.
Mississippi M1841 rifle	A 2 band rifle with a sword bayonet which was issued to Confederate NCOs
Brown Bess musket	A caplock conversion of older flintlock muskets imported by the Confederacy
Potzdam musket	Prussian caplock muskets converted from flintlock and imported during the conflict
Richmond rifled musket	A Confederate copy of the Springfield M1855 without Maynard tape primer
Sharps rifle	The Sharps rifle was a falling-block rifle used during and after the American Civil War. It was particularly associated with the 1st and 2nd United States Sharpshooters.
Spencer repeating rifle	The Spencer M1860 was a manually operated lever-action repeating rifle fed from a tube magazine with cartridges. Fewer of these were issued compared to the carbine variant.
Springfield M1795 musket	The first .69 caliber smoothbore flintlock musket made in the US for the military
Springfield M1812 musket	
Springfield M1816 musket	Many of these old flintlock muskets were converted to the percussion system and some of the barrels were even rifled to accept the Minié ball. The quality of these conversions varied from one manufacturer to the next.
Springfield M1822 musket	
Springfield M1835 musket	
Springfield M1840 musket	The Springfield M1840 musket was the last flintlock musket manufactured for the US military, most were converted to percussion and rifled.
Springfield M1842 musket	The Springfield M1842 musket was the first musket produced with a percussion lock and last .69 caliber smoothbore, a large number were rifled prior to the start of the war.
Springfield M1855 rifled musket	The M1855 was the first standard issue rifled musket and in .58 caliber and used both the Maynard tape primer system and the Minié ball.
Springfield M1861 rifled musket	The M181 was the most widely used rifled musket of the civil war. Its main feature was the elimination of the Maynard tape primer from the earlier Springfield M1855.
Springfield M1863 rifled musket	A slightly modified version of the Springfield M1861
Volcanic M1855 repeating rifle	Volcanic M1855 used the same system as the Volcanic M1855 repeating pistol but had a longer barrel, magazine, and lever loop; and a stock. The repeating rifle was never issued but was bought privately.
Wesson M1859 rifle	The Wesson M1859 was a breech-loading, metallic rimfire cartridge rifle used during the American Civil War and the Indian Wars.
Whitworth rifle	The Whitworth rifle was the world's first sniper rifle, it was used particularly by the Confederate Whitworth Sharpshooters.
Enfield P1853 rifled musket Fayetteville M1862 rifle Lorenz M1854 rifled musket M1814 common rifle Mississippi M1841 rifle Richmond M1861 rifled musket Springfield M1842 musket Springfield M1855 rifled musket Springfield M1861 rifled musket Tarpley M1863 carbine Volcanic M1855 repeating rifle Whitworth P1857 rifle

=== Grenades ===
Thousands of hand grenades were used by belligerents on both sides, although shortcomings in the weapons of the time kept them from seeing widespread use; primarily they were reserved for sieges or trench warfare. One of the most common were Ketchum grenades, of which the Union government purchased 90,000 in total. Others included the Adams grenade and the Haynes "Excelsior" percussion grenade. Many artillery shells were also converted into makeshift grenades and either thrown or rolled down onto the enemy.

== Land mines and sea mines ==
The American Civil War saw the use of land mines, sea mines, booby traps and improvised explosive devices, which were collectively referred to as "torpedoes". These weapons were primarily used by the Confederates, who established a Torpedo Bureau to oversee their production. Gabriel J. Rains, who ran the Torpedo Bureau, pioneered the use of explosive devices on land, while Matthew Fontaine Maury was responsible for developing the first sea mines.

Although these explosive devices were effective, they were considered by officers on both sides to be cowardly, uncivilized weapons. Confederate general James Longstreet banned their used under his command, while Union general William T. Sherman hated them so much he reportedly ordered Confederate prisoners of war to march ahead of his troops to trigger any hidden explosives.

The first time American soldiers encountered torpedoes came during the Siege of Yorktown after the Confederates had abandoned the city. Gabriel Rains, then the commander of an Alabama and Georgia brigade, had taken upon himself to attach sensitive detonation devices of his own making to artillery shells; these he concealed not only in front of the Confederate lines, but within their own trenchworks and the city itself. This included boobytrapping many common items placed throughout the city. In the room of one Yorktown house, under a table was a coffeepot connected by string to a weight. If the pot was moved, the weight would fall on a torpedo, detonating it. An electrical telegraph station was rigged to blow if anyone touched the instrument, which it did when an operator attached to III Corps attempted to use it, killing him instantly.

== Machine Guns ==
There were machine guns available during the Civil War but their impact was minimal as very few were fielded by either side. One reason for this was opposition to their adoption by the military establishment, but also important were drawbacks in these early weapons' design. The use of black powder meant obscuring smoke quickly formed after just a few firings. The weapons themselves were too heavy to be carried except on a carriage, which limited where they could move. Their ammunition also was heavier, making it more difficult to carry enough rounds for adequate use.

Model	Notes for the subject
Agar machine gun	Nicknamed the "Coffee Mill" by Abraham Lincoln, the Agar fired a .58 caliber round from a single barrel. The rate of fire was kept at 120 rounds per minute to avoid overheating the barrel.
Billinghurst Requa Battery	The Billinghurst Requa Battery was a volley gun which had eight banks of cartridge chambers that were rotated into alignment behind the row of 25 barrels. A crew of three could fire seven volleys a minute, but its powder train was exposed to the elements.
Confederate revolving cannon	This breechloading cannon had a 2-inch bore and fired five rounds thanks to a revolving cylinder. At least one was used by the Confederates at the Siege of Petersburg and later captured by the Union.
Claxton machine gun	The Claxton was a double-barreled weapon invented by F.S. Claxton, son of naval officer Alexander Claxton. It was never adopted as it was considered too frail in construction.
Gatling gun	Arguably the most successful Civil War machine gun, the Gatling gun could sustain 150 rounds a minute thanks to its rotating barrel design. Although Chief of Ordnance James Wolfe Ripley was against its adoption, that did not stop individual generals like Benjamin Butler from purchasing them for their own use. Several were also used by The New York Times to defend their office during the New York City draft riots.
Gorgas machine gun	Invented by Josiah Gorgas, the Confederate Chief of Ordnance, this weapon also used a revolving cylinder to fire 18 rounds of 1.25-inch ammunition. Although it tested well it was not put into production before the war ended.
Vandenburgh volley gun	Invented by General Origen Vandenburgh, this volley gun was originally intended for service with the Union but they were rejected after testing. Vandenburgh later sold them to the Confederates, with at least one taking part in the Siege of Petersburg.
Williams gun	This Confederate "secret weapon" could fire 65 rounds per minute and was considered very reliable. The only exception was that its breach would expand after repeated firing and cause the lock to not secure properly.

== Artillery ==
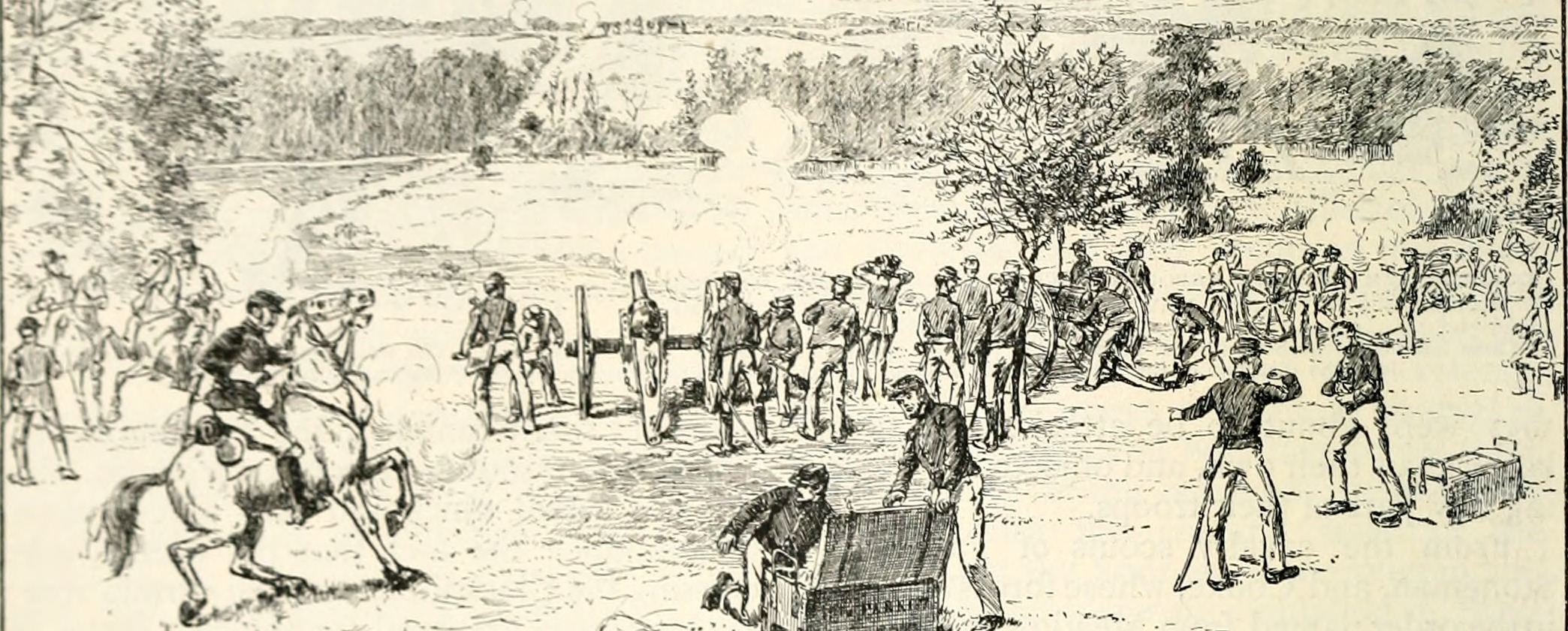
Artillery in action at the Battle of Beaver Dam Creek

Artillery during the Civil War was classified based on a variety of factors, such as weight, caliber, and mobility. The common types of artillery pieces were guns, which fired at long ranges along a flat trajectory; howitzers which were lighter and shorter, and fired a larger round with a light charge; and mortars which were very short and heavy, and fired a large projectile on a higher trajectory. A recent development was the gun-howitzer which combined aspects of a gun and howitzer into one weapon.

Both smoothbore and rifled artillery pieces found widespread use during the war. Rifled guns had the distinct advantages of greater range and superior accuracy, while smoothbore pieces were more reliable and could achieve a greater rate of fire. This was due in part to smoothbore artillery using fixed ammunition, with the projectile and charge bound together, while rifled pieces used semi-fixed rounds where these were loaded separately. Guns could fire solid shot, shell, spherical case (shrapnel), and canister shot. Howitzers could fire all but solid shot, and mortars could only fire shell and spherical case.

Bronze (sometimes erroneously referred to as brass) allowed for lightweight smoothbore artillery pieces. Some rifled artillery was also made of bronze but the rifling would erode too quickly. Instead, most rifled artillery was made of wrought iron, or cast iron reinforced with wrought iron bands. Heavyweight smoothbores were almost all wrought iron as well. Although steel was increasing in availability, it was still too expensive and too difficult to produce in large enough quantities to be used for artillery.

=== Field artillery ===
Field artillery were cannons and howitzers light enough to be mounted on gun carriages and maneuvered around on the battlefield. Each piece was hooked up to a limber allowing it to be pulled by a team of six horses driven by three drivers. An accompanying caisson carried additional ammunition and was also pulled by a similar six-horse team. The cannoneers who operated each piece marched alongside the artillery when it was on the move but could ride on the limber and caisson if necessary. Horse artillery, also known as "flying artillery", differed in that every man was mounted on a horse.

In 1841, the US Army had selected a field artillery system based on bronze smoothbore muzzleloaders: the M1841 6-pounder field gun, the M1841 12-pounder howitzer and 12-pounder gun, the M1841 mountain howitzer, the M1841 24-pounder howitzer and the M1844 32-pounder howitzer. The introduction of the M1857 12-pounder Napoleon represented a significant development as the gun-howitzer could replace several of the outdated pieces at once. The Napoleon, along with the 10-pounder Parrott rifle, the 20-pounder Parrott rifle, and the 3-inch ordnance rifle, came to constitute the vast majority of Union field artillery during the Civil War. The Confederates meanwhile had to make do with a wider variety of field artillery and went so far as to melt down outdated pieces so they could be recast as newer models.

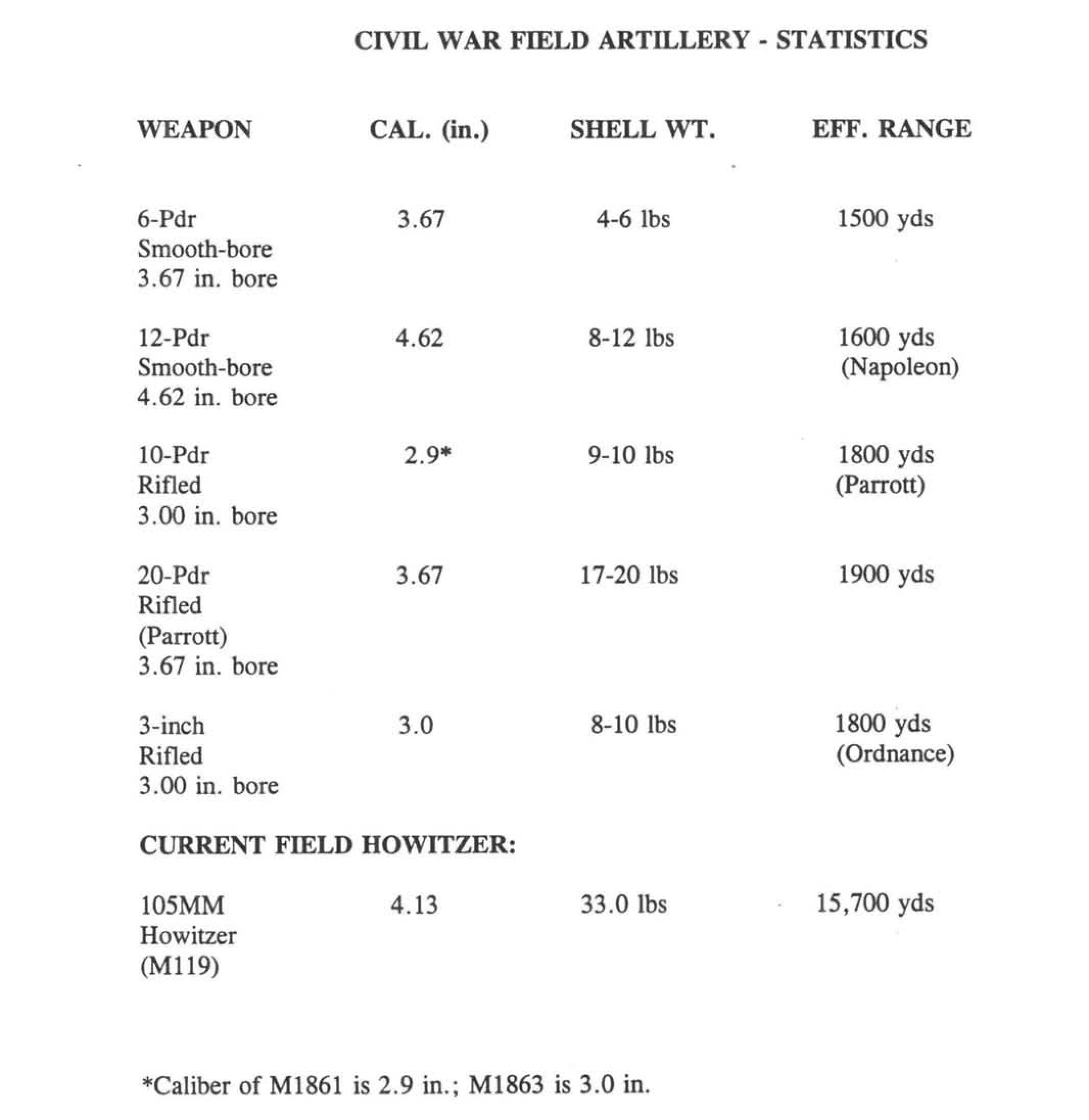
Comparison of common Civil War field artillery with the modern M119 howitzer

=== Heavy artillery ===
Heavy artillery during the Civil War consisted of siege artillery, garrison artillery, and coastal artillery. Siege and garrison artillery were larger versions of field artillery, mounted on heavyweight carriages which allowed them very limited mobility: the M1839 24-pounder smoothbore was the largest one which could still be moved by road. Siege artillery fired the same ammunition as field artillery with the addition of grapeshot, which by 1861 had been abandoned by field pieces. Coastal artillery was meant to be used from fixed positions and, as weight was not an issue, included some of the largest pieces of the war. Coastal artillery could also fire heated shot.

While smoothbore siege artillery had been common previously, the superiority of rifled guns in destroying fortifications saw them dominate during the Civil War. Early examples of siege artillery include the 4.5-inch siege rifle and James rifles. These were joined by larger versions of Parrott rifles and Blakely rifles. Coastal artillery included massive columbiads like the Rodman gun.

Siege and coastal mortars ranged from 8-inch models which could accompany an army's siege train to massive 13-inch monsters which had to be disassembled and carried by rail or ship to travel any distance. The Coehorn mortar however was a type of small mortar light enough to be carried by four men. This made it very useful for trench warfare and even during mobile battles like at Cold Harbor.

=== Naval ordnance ===
The Dahlgren gun was the standard weapon of the United States Navy. These smoothbore guns were also referred to as "shellguns" as they were designed to fire massive exploding shells. Rifled artillery also found use on Navy ships, some of which were just identical versions of Army models while others were designed especially for naval use. The Confederate Navy was heavily reliant on British imports for their naval artillery, although they managed to manufacture some domestic models, which were used both at sea and on land.

Although naval artillery was primarily mounted on and intended to destroy ships, it could play a role in land battles of the Civil War, including being brought ashore as occurred during the Siege of Vicksburg. The 12-pounder Dahlgren in fact was designed to be used mounted on the bow of a small boat, then be transferred to a field carriage in a matter of minutes.

Types of Artillery during the Vicksburg Campaign
Type	Model	Bore Dia (in.)	Length (in.)	Tube wt. (lbs)	Carriage wt. (lbs.)	Range (yds) /deg. elev
Field Artillery
Smoothbores
6-pounder	Gun	3.67	65.6	884	900	1,513/5°
12-pounder "Napoleon"	Gun; Howitzer	4.62	72.15	1,227	1.128	1,680/5°
12-pounder	Howitzer	4.62	58.6	788	900	1,072/5°
24-pounder	Howitzer	5.82	71.2	1,318	1,128	1,322/5°
Rifles
10-pounder	Parrot	3.0	78	890	900	2,970/10°
3-inch	Ordnance	3.0	73-3	820	900	2,788/10°
20-pounder	Parrot	3.67	89.5	1,750		4,4011/15°
Siege and Garrison
Smoothbores
8-inch	Howitzer	8.0	61.5	2,614	50.5 shell	2,280/12°30'
10-inch	Mortar	10.0	28.0	1,852	87.5 shell	2,028/45°
12-pounder	Gun	4.62	116.0	3,590	12.3 shot	
24-pounder	Gun	5.82	124.0	5,790	24.4 shot	1,901/5°
Rifles
18-pounder*	Gun (Rifled)	5-3	123.25			
30-pounder	Parrot	4.2	132.5	4,200	29.0 shell	6,700/25°
*The Confederate "Whistling Dick" was an obsolete smoothbore siege gun, rifled and banded.
Seacoast Artillery
Smoothbore
8-inch	Columbiad	8.0	124	9,240	65 shot	4,812/27°30'
9-inch*	Dahlgren	9.0				
10-inch	Columbiad	10-0	126	15,400	128 shot	5,654/39° 15'
11-inch	Dahlgren	11-0	161	15,700		3,650/20'
32-pounder	Gun	6-4	125-7	7,200	32-6 shot	1,922/5°
42-pounder	Gun	7-0	129	8,465	42.7 shot	1,955/5°
Rifles
6.4-inch	Brooke	6.4	144	9,120		
7-inch	Brooke	7-0	147.5	14,800		
7.5. inch**	Blakely	7.5	100			
100-pounder	Parrott	6-4	155	9,700	100 shot	2,247/5°
*A Confederate produced copy of Dahlgren's basic design
**The famous Confederate "Widow Blakely" was probably a British 42-pounder smoothbore shortened, banded, and rifled.
Naval Artillery
Type	Model	Bore Dia (in.)	Length (in.)	Tube wt. (lbs)	Projectile wt. (lbs.)	Range (yds) /deg. elev
Smoothbores
8- inch	Dahlgren	8	115.5	6,500	51 shell	1,657/5°
9-inch	Dahlgren	9	131.5	9,000	72-5 shell	1,710/5°
11-inch	Dahlgren	11	161	15,700	136 shell	1,712/5°
12-pounder	Howitzer	4.62	63.5	760	10 hell	1,08515°
24-pounder	Howitzer	5.82	67	1,310	20 shell	1,270/5°
32-pounder	Gun	6-4	108	4,704	32 shot	1,756/5°
64-pounder	Gun	8	140.95	11,872		
Rifles
30- pounder	Parrott	4.2	112	3,550	29 shell	2,200/5º
42-pounder**	Gun(rifled)	7	121	7,870	42 shot	
50-pounder	Dahlgren	5.1	107	6,000	50 shot	
100-pounder	Patron	6.4	155	9,700	100 shot	2,200/5°
Mortars
13-inch	Mortar	13	54.5	17,120	200 bell	4,200/45°
Some naval guns served ashore as siege artillery. Moreover, many guns mounted on the boats of the Mississippi River Squadron were in fact Army field artillery and siege guns.
**Converted smoothbore

== Special weapons ==
- Rockets had fallen out of favor in the 19th century due to improvements in artillery, but the start of the Civil War inspired a reexamination of the technology. Congreve rockets, which had seen use in the War of 1812 and the Mexican-American War, saw a resurgence of use by the Confederates, while the Union made use of the improved Hale rockets. Special rocket artillery units were also formed, such as the New York Rocket Battalion and the Confederate Rocket Battalion, but the poor performance of their weaponry saw such units disbanded and rearmed with traditional artillery.
- Chemical weapons were not actively employed during the Civil War, although individuals on both sides sent proposals for their use to their respective war departments. These ranged from using artillery shells, to hot-air balloons, to glass hand grenades as methods to deliver poisonous gas on the enemy, but these suggestions were not acted upon for the most part. Louis M. Goldsborough reportedly discovered a Confederate plot to steal the USS Monitor by the crew of the CSS Virginia releasing chloroform gas before boarding her, but it never came to fruition. The closest that chemical weapons came to actual use was during the Siege of Petersburg: after the Battle of the Crater, Confederate engineer William W. Blackford dug counter-tunnels and placed smoke cartridges which, when activated by a nearby sentry, would asphyxiate any Union sappers. However, the Union attempted no further mining operations and so the system was never activated.
- Biological weapons, like chemical weapons, were not released by either side during the Civil War but proposals were made to do so. Many such ideas would have never worked however due to a misunderstanding in how these diseases were spread. A proposal to spread yellow fever among Union troops, for example, relied on using contact with infected persons or materials when it was actually spread by mosquitoes. In his retreat from the Siege of Vicksburg and being chased by William T. Sherman, Joseph E. Johnston ordered livestock driven into local water sources and shot so that their dead bodies would taint the water. However, Sherman's troops were in such close pursuit that the carcasses did not have time to fully decompose and so the water remained safe if unappealing to drink.
- The Winans Steam Gun was a unique weapon which used centrifugal force rather than gunpower to launch projectiles at a supposed rate of fire of 200 a minute. First built by William Joslin and Charles S. Dickinson, a pair of Ohio inventors, it was seized by Union forces when Dickinson attempted to sell it to the Confederates. The weapon was never used in actual combat however and eventually scrapped.
- Calcium floodlights were employed during the siege of Fort Wagner, allowing Union forces to bombard the fortress both day and night under illumination. Such lights were also used to spot blockade runners.

== Vehicles ==
=== Animals ===
- Horse
- Pack mule

=== Carriages ===
- Horse drawn carriages
- Steam powered carriages

=== Trains ===
- BLW Armed train

=== Ships ===
- Ships of the Union navy
- Ships of the Confederate Navy

=== Submarines ===
- USS Alligator
- CSS Hunley
- CSS Pioneer
- CSS Pioneer II (Also known as CSS American diver)
- CSS Bayou Saint John

=== Aircraft ===
==== Air balloons ====
- Union Army Balloon Corps
- Confederate Army Balloon Corps

==== Airships ====
- Andrews Aereon airship

== See also ==
- French weapons in the American Civil War

== Bibliography ==
- Andrews, Evan (September 2018). "8 Unusual Civil War Weapons". History.
- Broadwater, Robert (2014). Civil War Special Forces: The Elite and Distinct Fighting Units of the Union and Confederate Armies. Bloomsbury Publishing USA. ISBN 1440830584.
- Coggins, Jack (1983). Arms & Equipment of the Civil War. The Fairfax Press. ISBN 0517402351.
- Gabel, Christopher R., Staff ride handbook for the Vicksburg Campaign, December 1862-July 1863. Fort Leavenworth, Kan.: Combat Studies Institute Press, 2001. OCLC 47296103.
- Myatt, Frederick (1994). The Illustrated Encyclopedia of 19th Century Firearms: An Illustrated History of the Development of the World's Military Firearms During the 19th Century. Crescent Books. p. 216. ISBN 0-517-27786-7.
- Ricketts, Howard (1964). Firearms. Weidenfeld and Nicolson. p. 115.
- Rutherford, Kenneth (2020). America's Buried History: Landmines in the Civil War. Savas Beatie. ISBN 1611214548.
- King, Curtis S., William G. Robertson, and Steven E. Clay. Staff Ride Handbook for the Overland Campaign, Virginia, 4 May to 15 June 1864: A Study on Operational-Level Command.. Fort Leavenworth, Kan.: Combat Studies Institute Press, 2006. OCLC 62535944.
