= Broach =

Broach may refer to:

- Broaching (metalworking), a machining operation that uses a metalworking tool with a series of chisel points mounted on one piece of steel
- Broach (nautical), a sudden loss of control of a vessel caused either by wind action or wave action
- BROACH warhead, an advanced multi-stage warhead developed by a consortium of British companies
- Broach spire, a spire that starts on a square base and is carried up to a tapering octagonal spire by means of triangular faces
- Barbed broach, a dental instrument
- Bharuch, in older English sources spelled Broach (in Sanskrit documents known as Bhrigukaccha, also Bharukaccha; Greeks knew it as Barygaza), is a city at the mouth of the river Narmada in Gujarat in western India. Bharuch is the administrative headquarters of Bharuch District.
- Brioche —it is a bread.

== People ==
- Chris Broach (born 1976), American musician in the band Braid
- Elise Broach (born 1963), American author

== See also ==
- Brooch, a decorative item designed to be attached to garments
- Bharuch, also known as "Broach", a city and district in south Gujarat state in India
