= Frank Wesson Rifles =

Frank Wesson rifle
- Type: Carbine, Rifle
- Place of origin: United States

Service history
- In service: 1861–1865
- Used by: United States Army; Missouri State Militia
- Wars: American Civil War; Indian Wars

Production history
- Designer: Frank Wesson
- Designed: 1859, 1862
- No. built: 44,000+
- Variants: sporter, carbine, military

Specifications
- Mass: 6 lb (2.7 kg) carbine, to 8.5 lb (3.9 kg)
- Length: 43 inches (1,100 mm)
- Cartridge: .44 long rimfire (military).22 long.32 long.38 long
- Barrels: 24 inches (610 mm) carbine up to 34 inches (860 mm)
- Action: Break-action
- Rate of fire: 8–10 shots per minute
- Muzzle velocity: 1,000 ft/s (300 m/s)
- Effective firing range: 200 yd (180 m)
- Maximum firing range: 500 yd (460 m)
- Sights: Tang and iron sights

Frank Wesson rifles were a series of single-shot rifles manufactured between 1859 and 1888 in Worcester, Massachusetts. They were purchased by many state governments during the American Civil War, including Illinois, Indiana, Kansas, Kentucky, Missouri, and Ohio. They were one of the first rifles to use rimfire metallic cartridges.

The rifles were initially made in .22, .32, .38, and .44 rimfire. Centerfire cartridges were added later, and some rifles were capable of firing rimfire or centerfire cartridges, by altering an adjustment on the hammer.

== History of the rifle ==
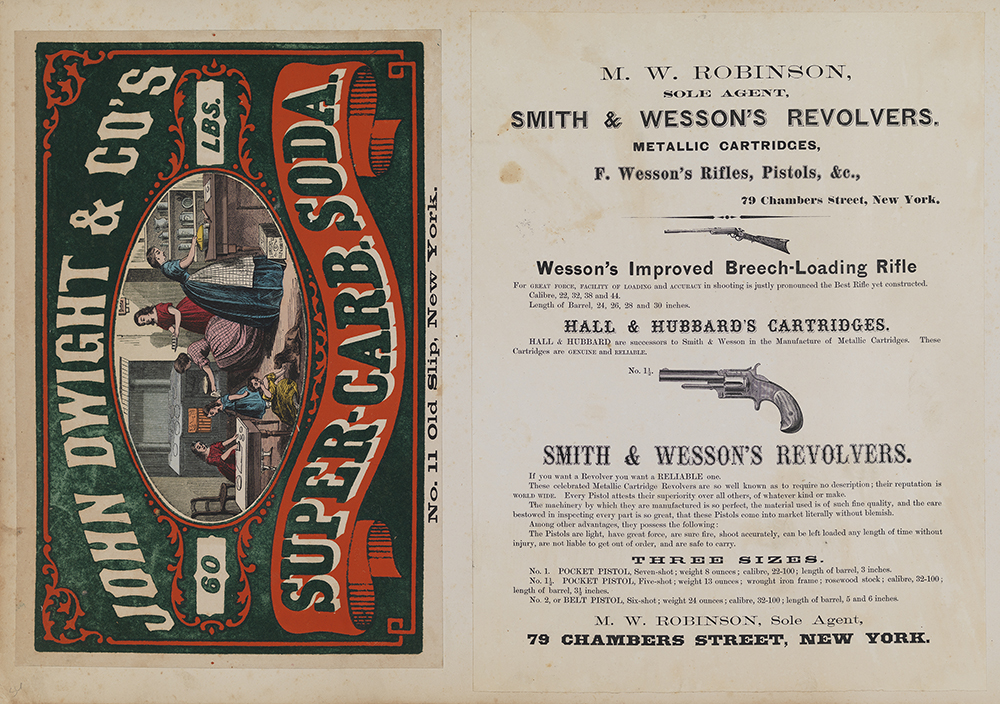
Frank Wesson Rifles advertisement

By 1859, there were a number of single-shot breech-loading rifles available to the American military and public. These included the Sharps rifle (1848), the Smith carbine (1857), and others. Those most suitable for military use were loaded through the breech, but required a separate percussion cap to ignite the cartridge.

Copper rimfire cartridges which contained their own primer were introduced just prior to the American Civil War. Only a few manufacturers came out with guns which could use this ammunition; these included the Henry repeating rifle (cartridge introduced in 1860), Spencer repeating rifle, Maynard carbine, Frank Wesson rifles, and Ballard rifles. The .44 caliber Frank Wesson and Ballard rifles could use the same cartridge as each other, and these cartridges were very close in size to the .44 Henry rimfire.

The Frank Wesson rifle was the first breech-loading rifle designed for these metallic cartridges.

Frank Wesson (1828–1899) and N.S. Harrington were granted patent 25,926, 'Improvement in Breech-Loading Fire-Arms' in 1859, and Frank Wesson was granted patent 36,925, 'Improvement in Breech-Loading Fire-Arms' in 1862.

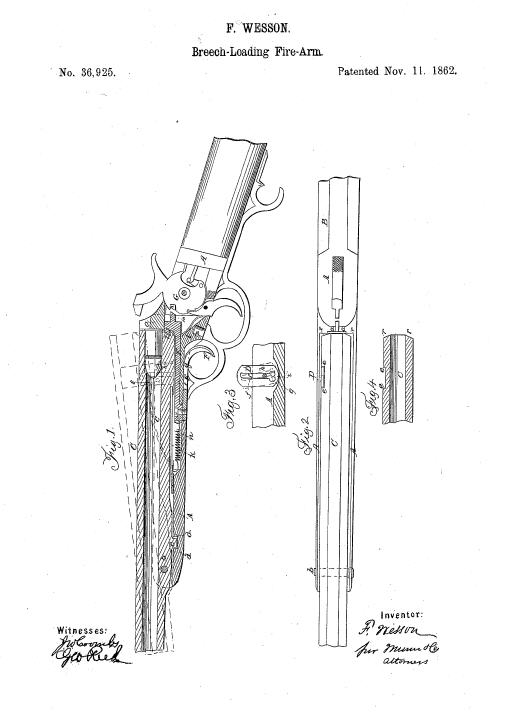
Patent 36,925 drawing of breech opening mechanism, and slotted link for controlling opening of rifle. Model shown is Frank Wesson two trigger model.

The 1862 patent added the use of a slotted link to stop the barrel from pivoting too far, which made the gun much easier and quicker to load. The carbine with a 24-inch barrel weighed only 6 pounds, low weight being desirable in a weapon to be carried by cavalry. The 28 and 34 inch barrel models weighing 7 and 8 pounds respectively.

By 1866, twenty thousand Frank Wesson rifles had been made, of which 8,000 were military.

=== Shooting Trials ===
On October 7, 1863, at the Missouri State Fair, in a contest between three infantry companies, shots fired from a Wesson rifle hit a man-sized target 45 times out of 100, at a distance of 300 yards. In a trial at St. Louis, competing against other rifles, a man-sized target was hit 56 times out of 100, the second best rifle scoring 10 of 100. At the Massachusetts State trial of breech-loading weapons, at Readville, 20 shots in a row hit a target at 200 yards, and 50 shots were fired in 4 minutes. A Dr. I.J. Wetherbee, of Boston, shot a string of 12 shots at 110 yards, with telescopic sights, with a 34-inch barreled breech-loading rifle. His target is shown here.

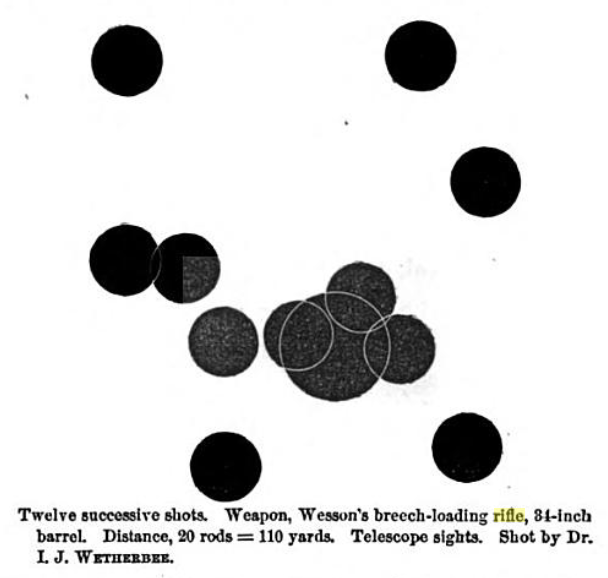
Target shot by I.J. Wetherbee, at 110 yards, with telescopic sights, using a Two-Trigger (tip-up) Frank Wesson rifle.

The rifle was also tested at Leavenworth, Kansas, and by General P.F. Robinson, Kentucky.

== Use during the American Civil War ==
Between 3000 and 4000 of these carbines were used by the military during the war. Over 2000 Wesson rifles were sold to militia in the states of Kentucky and Illinois. 44 caliber carbines were purchased by individuals and state governments during the Civil War. Many of these weapons were sold through a company called Kittredge & Co, of Cincinnati, Ohio, who have their name stamped on the barrel of these weapons.

In July 1862, Brigadier-General J. T. Boyle of Kentucky complained about Gallagher guns, calling them 'worthless'. He stated that 'They snap often, the cartridge hangs in after firing; difficult to get the exploded cartridges out often with screw-driver; men throw them away and take musket or any other arm. They are unquestionably worthless.' He then requested 'Sharps, Wessons, Ballards, or any other kind of carbine.' He mentioned that Wesson carbines can be had for $25 or less from Cincinnati.

The Wesson carbine was used primarily by the Union armies, as the Confederacy did not manufacture rim fire cartridges. However, in November 1862, the Confederacy did arrange for the smuggling of 10 Wesson rifles, and 5,000 cartridges to Texas, via Cuba. These rifles were smuggled by Harris Hoyt, who was brought to trial in January 1865. The rifles at that time cost $25 each, the cartridges $11 per thousand.

Wesson carbines were in use at battle of Gettysburg in 1863, and at the battle of Westport in 1864.

In January 1863, the state of Ohio had 150 Wesson carbines on hand. At that time, they also had 54,000 Wesson cartridges. The 11th Cavalry regiment was issued 100 Wesson carbines and 400 Spencer repeating rifles. The states of Kentucky and Illinois purchased 2000 for their state militias.

In July 1863, in a letter to Major S.B. Shaw, St. Louis, Mo, T.F. Robinson, Quartermaster-General of Kentucky reported that portions of two Kentucky regiments had been armed with the "Wesson Cartridge Rifle", were pleased with it, and would not exchange it for any other rifle.

Following the Lawrence Massacre on August 21, 1863, the surviving men formed a rifle company, using Wesson rifles. These weapons, along with their revolvers were carried at all times.

Kentucky purchased 1366 Wesson carbines, Indiana purchased 760 for their cavalry, from B. Kittredge & Co., Cincinnati, and the numbers for Ohio, Kansas and Missouri are not known. Individual soldiers of Kansas and Missouri purchased an unknown number of these rifles. Missouri had over 690 in their regimental armories in 1864.

In 1862, the 7th Kentucky Cavalry was issued 500 Wesson carbines at a price of $25 each. In the summer of 1863, individuals from the 11th Regiment, 1st Battalion, Ohio Volunteer Cavalry, purchased 200 Wesson rifles. Companies I and L were also issued Wesson rifles by the state. At least 300 individuals from the 5th Missouri State Militia (MSM) Cavalry purchased this weapon during the war, some of which were used during Price's Raid. In that raid, the men of the 5th were placed on specific parts of the battlefield in order to take advantage of their more rapid rate of fire. Troopers from the 3rd MSM also carried Wesson carbines. At that time, the cost of this carbine was $40 each. The 48th Illinois Infantry carried an unknown number of Wesson carbines, and ran out of ammunition for these rifles during the Battle of Ezra Church (part of the Atlanta campaign) on July 28, 1864. During that battle, some regiments expended 100 bullets per soldier. At the Battle of Westport, also during Price's Raid, some men of the 19th Kansas State Militia carried this rifle.

=== Advantages of rimfire breech-loading rifles ===
The primary advantages of rimfire breech-loading rifles during the American Civil War were that the rifle could be loaded easily, that the ammunition was self-contained, and that the ammunition was relatively weather-proof.

Most rifles used during the American Civil War were muzzle loading rifles. To load these rifles, powder would be poured into the muzzle, a patch would be placed around the ball or Minie ball, the ball would be forced down the barrel using a ramrod, the ramrod would be replaced, a percussion cap would be pressed onto a nipple on the rifle, and the hammer would be drawn back.

To load these rifles quickly, it was necessary for the soldier to stand. This made these rifles difficult to use for cavalry, which required that the cavalry typically be dismounted if using muzzle loading rifles. Breech loading rifles, on the other hand, could be loaded while mounted on horseback.

Most rifles, including some that were breech-loading, also used a percussion cap, which required that the soldier carry percussion caps in addition to other ammunition requirements. These requirements would have been powder, bullets, patches, and percussion caps. A soldier using a Frank Wesson or Henry rifle would have only needed to carry cartridges.

For rifles which used separate ball and powder, the ball and powder would be contained in a paper cartridge. In wet weather, these cartridges were easily damaged. The copper cartridges used by Henry, Wesson, Ballard and others tolerated moisture better, and were more impervious to wet conditions.

== Sales and use following the American Civil War ==
Frank Wesson rifles continued to be made until 1888. On November 21, 1877, Buffalo Bill, following one of his Wild West shows, competed with Lincoln C. Daniels, a marksman. Both competitors were using new Wesson rifles. Other members in his troupe also used Wesson rifles. The competition was held in Worcester, Massachusetts, where the Wesson factory was located.

In 1867, the War Department authorized sale of many weapons, including 19,551 weapons at the Leavenworth arsenal in Kansas. This sale included Wesson carbines, as well as many other revolvers, rifles and carbines of the period (29 different types).

In 1869, the War Department purchased far fewer weapons of all kinds than it had in the Civil War. Only three Frank Wesson carbines were purchased during the year, for $20 each. At the same time, it purchased, or had modified 13,098 Sharps carbines (listed as 'Sharps carbines, altered'), at approximately $4 each.

As late as 1873, Indiana still had 716 Kittredge marked Wesson carbines in their armory. In June 1873, Kentucky had 314 of these carbines, and in August 1875, had 298 of these rifles in good condition, erroneously recorded as 'Smith & Wesson rifles, calibre .44', though they were Wesson carbines. These rifles were stored in their state arsenal.

Bullets from a Frank Wesson rifle were found at the Hembrillo Battlefield (1880), New Mexico; and at the Battle of Little Big Horn (1876), Montana.

== Rifle models ==
On all 'two-trigger' models, the front trigger opened the rifle, the rear trigger fired it. The following models of rifles were made by Frank Wesson. Dates are approximate. Military models had a three position sight, for 100, 250 and 500 yards.

=== Two-trigger models ===
Models:

- 1st Type - a slotted link to keep the barrel from swinging too high was on the right hand side of the rifle. In later years of this model, an extractor was on the left hand side. The frames were iron or brass. (1859-1864)
- 2nd Type - the slotted link moved to the left hand side of the rifle, the extractor moved to the right side. Iron frames only. (1863-1876)
- 3rd Type - an adjustable hammer, patented in 1872, was available for rimfire or centerfire. (1872-1888)
- 4th Type (aka Mid Range No. 2) - globe front sight replaced the German silver sight. (1872-1888)
- 5th Type (aka New Model) - Frame was flat on vertical sides to the left and right of the hammer mechanism.(1876-1888)

== Calibers of Ammunition ==
The Wesson rifle was available in .22, 32, .38 rimfire and .44 rimfire. It was also available in 30-30 Wesson and .44 Wesson Extra Long.

== See also ==
- Sharps rifle, .56 calibre
- Maynard carbine, .50 calibre, requires percussion cap
- Smith carbine, .50 calibre, requires percussion cap
- Henry rifle, .44 calibre
- H & R Firearms
- Rifles in the American Civil War
