= Edward Maynard =

American firearms inventor

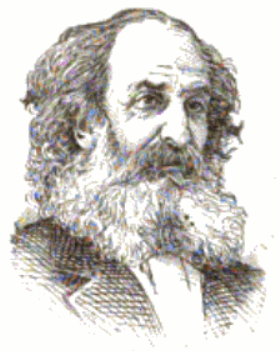
- Born: April 26, 1813; Madison, New York
- Died: May 4, 1891 (aged 78); Washington, D.C.
- Occupations: Dentist, firearms designer
- Spouses: Sophia Ellen Doty (m. 1838) Nellie Long (m. 1869)

Edward Maynard (April 26, 1813 – May 4, 1891) was an American dentist and firearms inventor, most famous for his breechloading rifle design, the Maynard carbine.

== Life ==
Edward Maynard was born in Madison, New York, on April 26, 1813. In 1831 he entered the United States Military Academy at West Point but resigned after only a semester due to ill health and became a dentist in 1835.

Maynard continued to practice dentistry for the rest of his life, becoming one of the most prominent dentists in the United States. Practicing in Baltimore and Washington, D.C., his clientele included the country's political elite, including Congressmen and Presidents, and it is reported that he was offered but declined the position of Imperial Dentist to Tsar Nicholas I. In 1857 he became professor of theory and practice in Baltimore College of Dental Surgery.

Maynard had two wives; his first was Sophia Ellen Doty (born 1826, and to which all of his known children were born) and Nellie Long (born 1845). Maynard's son, George Willoughby Maynard, was born in Washington, D.C., on March 5, 1843, and became a successful artist. His other children included John (born 1855), Ellen (born 1858), Josephine (born 1860), Marie (born 1852), Virginia (born 1854), and Edna (born 1870).

In 1845 Maynard patented the first of 23 firearms-related patents he was awarded during his life.

In 1888 he held the chair of Dental Theory and Practice at the National university in Washington. He died in Washington on May 4, 1891, and was buried in the Congressional Cemetery.

== Firearms inventions ==
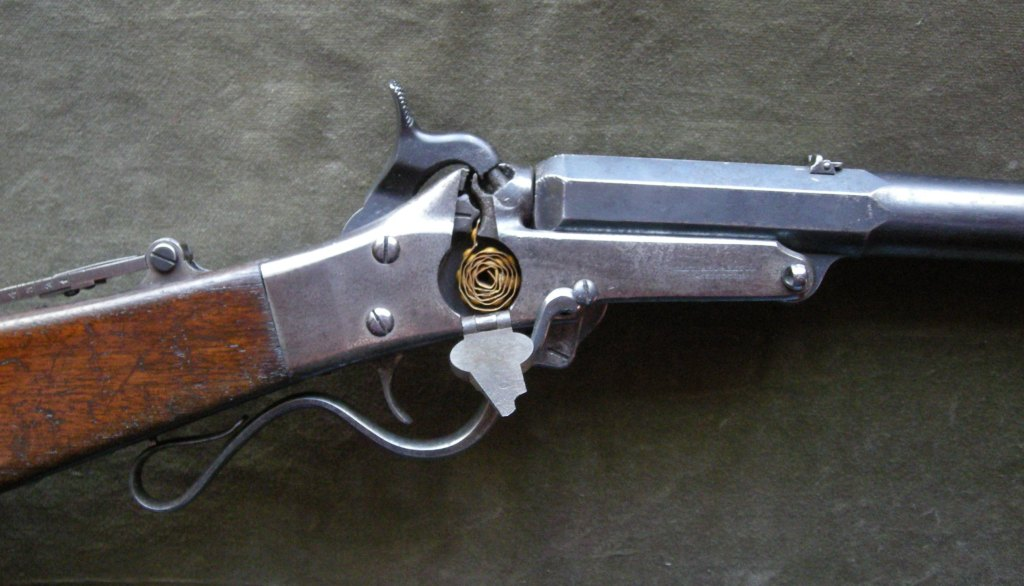
Maynard priming system

Maynard invented many dental methods and instruments, such as the barbed broach—a demonstration of which prompted Tsar Nicholas to offer Maynard the title of Actual Dentist to His Imperial Majesty. However, Maynard is more famous for his firearms inventions, many of which were incorporated into the Maynard carbine that bears his name. He achieved lucrative fame for his first patent, an 1845 priming system which cycled a small mercury fulminate charge to the nipple of a percussion cap firearm. His system used a magazine from which a paper roll, not unlike modern cap guns, advanced a charge over the nipple as the gun was cocked; this was intended to accelerate the gun's rate of fire as the shooter could concentrate on loading and firing the gun. The system was quickly adopted by several commercial gun makers, and the United States government decided to test it.

In 1845 the Maynard system was installed on 300 converted percussion muskets and trials were considered successful. Maynard turned over the patent rights to his priming system to the United States Federal Government in exchange for a royalty of $1.00 per weapon: a substantial sum at the time (the cost of making an entire 1861 Springfield was $18.00.) In 1855 the Maynard Tape Primer System was installed on all 1855 model .58 caliber military rifles and carbines made at Federal arsenals.

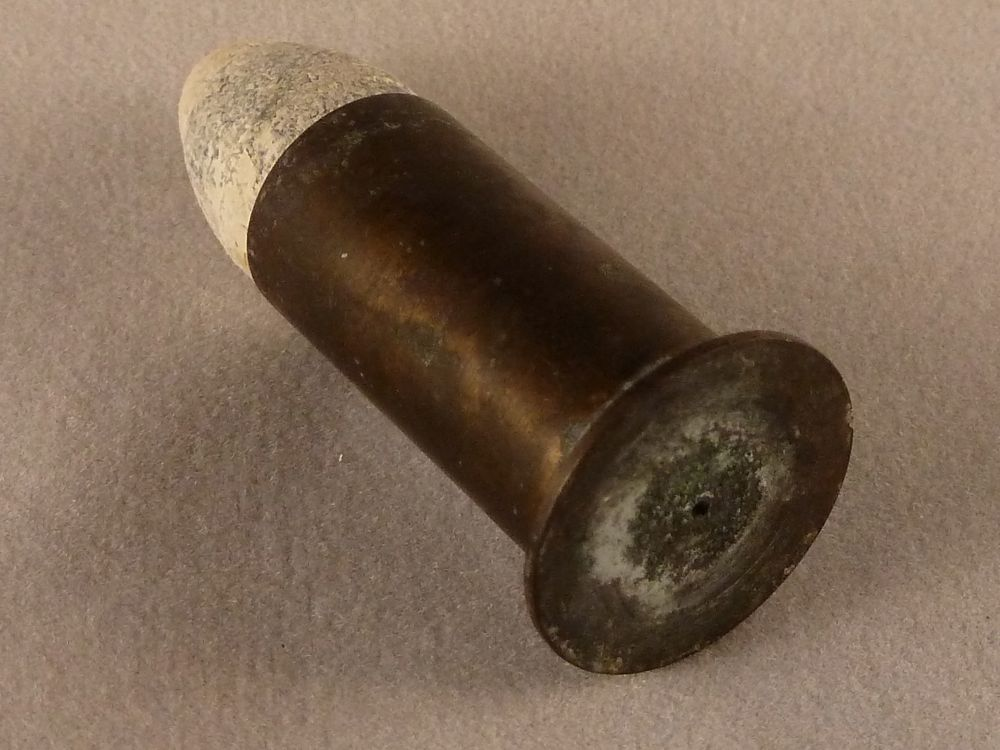
The base of an unfired Maynard 52 caliber cartridge showing the hole in the middle of the base

However the system was complicated and often malfunctioned in wartime conditions. During the Crimean War British cavalrymen had been equipped with 2,000 Greene carbines, a Maynard system firearm, and the system was found to be unreliable in the field. In 1860 U.S. ordnance officers recommended dropping the Maynard Tape Primer System, and the famous 1861 Springfield rifled muskets did not use it.

In 1851, however, Maynard had patented a more successful idea: a simple lever-operated breechloading rifle, which used a metallic cartridge his own invention. When the gun's lever was depressed the barrel rose, opening the breech for loading. Afterwards the lever was raised to close the gun's breech. Once cocked the loaded weapon could be primed by either placing a percussion cap directly on its nipple or by using Maynard's priming system to advance a primer to the nipple. The brass Maynard cartridge did not have an integral percussion cap; a small hole in the middle of its base fired it when the external cap was detonated. The cartridge, which had a wide rim permitting swift extraction, was reloadable up to 100 times. This was of particular advantage to the Confederacy, as the cartridges could be manufactured without the sophisticated equipment that the south generally lacked. Another significant feature was that the use of a metallic cartridge prevented gas escape at the breech, a concern for early externally primed breechloaders.

Most of the pre-war production run of the first model Maynard carbines were purchased by Southern states in the run-up to the American Civil War, and subsequently saw use by Confederate cavalry units. The improved 1863 model Maynard lacked the tape primer and stock patch box of the first model, relying on percussion caps instead. The 1863 model was produced in larger numbers and used by Union cavalry during the later stages of the conflict. The Maynard carbine was one of the most-accurate breechloading carbines used in the war and was highly valued by soldiers on both sides who had access to the weapon.
