= Richmond rifle =

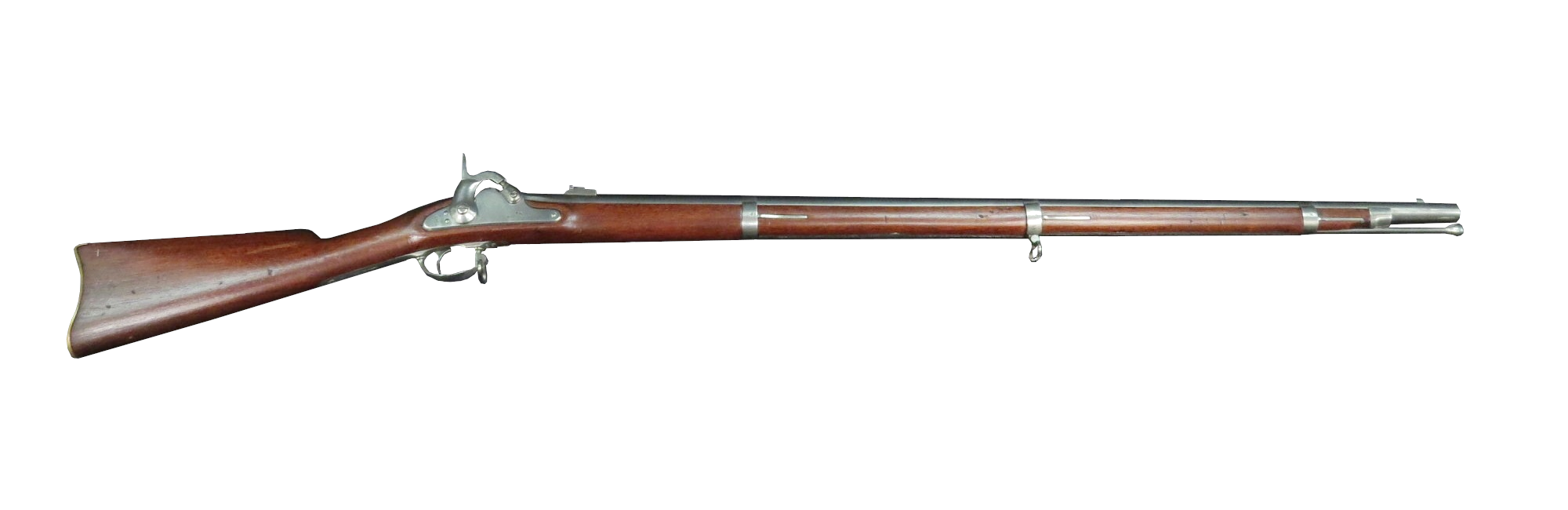
- Type: Rifled musket
- Place of origin: Confederate States

Service history
- Used by: Confederate States
- Wars: American Civil War

Production history
- Designer: Confederate Ordnance Department
- Designed: 1861
- Manufacturer: Richmond Armory
- Produced: 1861–1865
- No. built: 32,000 rifles (Note: Estimate were built from 30k to 35k. Other carbines made less than 10k unit. Another estimated total production of rifle muskets at the arsenal is projected to range between 32,500 and 39,200 units. Some estimates suggest the figure may reach as high as 64,000 rifles.); 5,400 carbines 1,350 short rifles

Specifications
- Length: 56 inches (1.4 m)
- Barrel length: 40 inches (1.0 m)
- Cartridge: Paper cartridge, .58 Minié ball, Pritchett-type, hexagonal-type bullets
- Caliber: 0.58, .577, .45 cylindrical
- Barrels: 40-inch standard model, 33-inch short model, and 25-inch carbine model
- Action: Caplock
- Rate of fire: 2–3 per minute
- Muzzle velocity: 1,000–1,200 feet per second
- Effective firing range: 600 yards
- Feed system: Muzzle-loaded
- Sights: a "steady pin" rear sight based on the US M1858 two-leaf pattern, carbine and short rifle variants used a "pinched" front sight

The Richmond rifle, referred to as a 'High Hump' rifle, was a rifled musket produced by the Richmond Armory in Richmond, Virginia, for use by the Confederate States Army during the American Civil War.

Richmond carbine variant

== Background ==
At the start of the American Civil War, the Confederacy suffered from a lack of resources with the capability to produce small arms weapons. Virginia appropriated funds to modernize the Old State Armory building in Richmond with arms-making machinery manufactured in England, but the confrontation at Fort Sumter initiated the Union blockade which prevented delivery of the machinery. In April 1861, the Confederacy led by Thomas Jonathan Jackson captured the Union-held town of Harper's Ferry in western Virginia, and salvaged the machinery used to manufacture Springfield Model 1855 muskets by Turner Ashby's cavalry regiment. Confederate troops captured 33,993 black walnut stocks with the machinery. The machinery and stocks were shipped on the Winchester and Potomac Railroad to Winchester, Virginia, where they were transferred by wagons over the Valley Pike to be reloaded onto the Manassas Gap Railroad at Strasburg, Virginia for delivery to Richmond. The rifling machinery was transferred to the Fayetteville Arsenal.

== Production history ==
Close-up of a rifle lock plate

The Old State Armory building with Harpers Ferry Machinery was transferred to Confederate control in June 1861. Production began in October 1861 retaining the general form of the Model 1855, but without the Maynard tape primer mechanism and patch box and retained the pronounced high hump on the lockplate characteristic of the Maynard system, though Confederate models did not use this system; they incorporated captured Federal parts and had iron furniture with some brass accents, classified as Type I. Developed slightly later, Type II rifles featured a lower profile lockplate compared to Type I, reflecting gradual Confederate adaptations. These rifles often included some Richmond-manufactured components along with a mix of captured stocks and barrels The lock plate milling machine was modified in March 1862 to make manual capping easier by lowering the characteristic tape primer hump. Forged iron butt plates were replaced by brass butt plates concurrently with the lock modification. Type III produced from 1862 until the end of Richmond rifle production in 1865, these rifles are the most numerous and are sometimes called the three-band Springfield-style Richmond rifles. Type III rifles had a distinct low hump on the lockplate, were fully Confederate-manufactured, often had brass butt plates and nose caps, and incorporated the standard .58 caliber rifled barrel. They were designed for percussion caps, typically muzzle-loaded, and served extensively throughout the US Civil War. Most Confederate rifles also differed from the Union rifles they were based on with a different rear sight and brass nosecap. Richmond-made chamber rifle variant design, tooling, or lineage derives from the British Enfield system.

Virginian armory produced a variety of small arms for the Confederate States during the American Civil War, also known as the War Between the States. While tens of thousands of full-length rifles were made, including short rifles and musketoons. Schedule manufacturing both M1855 long fluted steel bayonets and short three-square iron bayonets similar in design to the Springfield Model 1847.

Gunstock machinery was moved south in response to Union advances and became operational in the former railway depot at Macon, Georgia in October 1862. Finished stocks were shipped to Richmond by rail. Richmond Armory began production of a cavalry carbine in November 1862 by reducing barrel length to 25 inches (64 cm) and overall length to 41 inches (1.0 m). Gunstock production at Macon peaked at two thousand per month in April 1863. Attempts were made to harvest stock blanks in North Carolina when the supply of captured gun stocks was exhausted, but Union sympathizers burned the North Carolina sawmill. Gunstock machinery was evacuated from Macon to avoid Sherman's March to the Sea. Production at Richmond shifted to a 49 inches (1.2 m) short rifle with a 33 inches (84 cm) barrel to use shorter pieces of wood considered unsuitable for normal-length rifles until the vanishing wood supply halted production in January 1865. After the war, many surviving rifle were surrendered to the US Army and many were sent to Mexico to arm the Mexican Army in their fight against the French.

== Reproductions ==
Euroarms Italia S.r.l., now Pedersoli, was an Italian firearms manufacturer based in Concesio, specializing in the production of black powder and antique replicas, including modern models such as the C.S. Richmond, the Springfield Model 1855, and other muzzleloaders. Ownership of the US importer Euroarms of America.

Confederate models can also shoot the .577 Pritchett ball, or Metford-Pritchet.

James Earl Jones, actors was famous for his iconic acting roles, but he was also known for collecting firearms, including historically significant pieces like a Richmond Model 1862 musket.

== See also ==
- Rifles in the American Civil War
- Duke of Richmond's muskets
