= Barbed broach =

A barbed broach is a hand-operated endodontic tool used to remove the pulp tissue during root canal treatments. They have been in widespread use at least since the early 1900s, and their introduction allowed dentists to remove tissue from much smaller root canals than before.

Barbed broaches are made from stainless steel with a plastic handle and tapered, round, soft iron wires, and the smooth surface is notched to form barbs. These barbs are designed to entangle the tissue so it can be removed intact from the canal wall. Shorter barbed broaches were also used as of the early 1900s to file down canal walls. Related are smooth broaches; originally used to dress or to wrap cotton to dry the root canal, they have since found broader use as pathfinders into the canal. Often thinner than barbed broaches and sometimes made of carbon steel, they are less prone to collapsing in fine canals. Hybrids of smooth and barbed broaches called "apex broaches" were also in use, with varying handle lengths.

Barbed broaches were pioneered by Edward Maynard in the mid-1800s. When Maynard demonstrated their use in St. Petersburg in 1845, using a watch spring filed down to a hair's thickness, Czar Nicholas was so impressed that he offered to appoint Maynard as Actual Dentist to His Imperial Majesty. Maynard declined.
