= Daniel Leavitt =

American inventor and arms maker

- Born: Daniel Leavitt; November 16, 1813; Rye, New Hampshire, United States
- Died: July 27, 1859 (aged 45); Chicopee, Massachusetts, United States
- Occupations: Inventor, arms maker
- Spouse: Ruth Jeannette Ball

Daniel Leavitt (November 16, 1813 – July 27, 1859) (Note: Daniel Leavitt was alive at the time of Samuel Colt's patent infringement trial of 1852, but his interests were represented by Edward Leavitt. Whether Leavitt was a brother or other relation is unclear. Leavitt was issued a patent for a rifle mechanism in June 1859 but would be dead the following month.) was an early American inventor who, with his partner Edwin Wesson, patented the first revolver after Samuel Colt's, and subsequently manufactured one of the first American revolving pistols. The innovative design was manufactured only briefly before a patent suit by Colt forced the company to stop producing the Leavitt & Wesson Dragoon revolver. But Leavitt's early patents, and those of his partner Wesson, stoked competition and helped drive the technological and manufacturing boom that produced the modern firearms industry.

== Early life ==
Leavitt was born November 16, 1813, at Rye, New Hampshire, the son of Benning Leavitt, influential businessman, state senator, county commissioner and later Chicopee Selectman, and his wife Olive (Jenness) Leavitt. Daniel Leavitt married in 1838 at West Springfield, Massachusetts, Ruth Jeannette Ball. They had three children.

== Leavitt's early patent ==
Leavitt took out a patent on his new design on April 29, 1837, when the U.S. Patent Office granted him United States patent number 182 for an 'improvement in many-chambered cylinder fire-arms.' The early weapon, the second of its kind, was a .40-caliber percussion, 6-shot single-action revolver with a 6 3/4-inch octagon tip-up barrel.

Leavitt took out his patent less than a year after Samuel Colt had obtained a patent on his seminal revolver, and before Colt had a chance to bring his new weapon to market. The patent was granted to Leavitt at his residence in Cabotville, Massachusetts, now part of Chicopee, Massachusetts. The design was radical in one respect. "The revolving cylinder which I use does not differ from such as have been previously employed in many-chambered guns," Leavitt wrote in his patent application. "The improvement which I have made consists in giving a convex form to that end of the revolving cylinder which is in contact with the barrel."

Leavitt's innovation was the beveled face of the cylinder, which was designed to direct flash from the fired cylinder away from adjacent chambers, thus preventing multiple discharges, the major problem with early percussion revolvers. In his design, Leavitt attempted to solve the problem through the beveling and the new convex shape he imparted to the revolving cylinder.

Leavitt's design, wrote Philadelphia's Journal of the Franklin Institute in 1838, was "one of those fire arms which have several chambers bored in a cylinder, the axis of which is parallel to the axis of the barrel of the gun, and which chambers can be successively made to coincide with the said barrel." But Leavitt's innovation, noted the Journal, was to make the end of the cylinder convex to draw off the fumes and flash of the cartridge explosions.

== Early firearm manufacturing ==
The inventor's early patent demonstrated that the firearms industry was attracting considerable innovation and competition as it was getting off the ground. (In the same year that Leavitt's patent was granted, the U.S. Patent Office granted two other men patents on innovations in many-chambered firearms). On February 25, 1836, Samuel Colt had been granted a U.S. patent (later renumbered X9430) for his patent for a 'revolving gun.'

The revolvers were produced in small quantities by the firm of Wesson, Stephens & Miller in nearby Hartford, Connecticut. In 1839 Edwin Wesson, principal of the manufacturing concern and himself an inventor, make some modifications to Leavitt's initial design, dubbing the new product the 'Wesson & Leavitt' revolver, which he began producing at a factory in Massachusetts, a concern which led to the formation of the Massachusetts Arms Company of Chicopee Falls, Massachusetts. After a patent grant to Wesson in 1850, awarded posthumously, (Note: Edward Wesson died suddenly in 1850 of a heart attack, leaving his brother Daniel to try to collect on his patents and attempt to organize the manufacturing based on them. The Massachusetts Arms Company had been organized by the heirs and kin of Edwin Wesson for the manufacture of revolvers under Wesson and Leavitt's patents. Born in Worcester, Massachusetts, in 1825, Daniel Baird Wesson went to work in his brother Edwin's manufactory in Northborough, Massachusetts, in 1843 as an apprentice.) the first Wesson & Leavitt revolvers rolled off the line at Chicopee Falls. The enormous 40-caliber handgun weighed over 4 pounds and was nearly 15 inches long, with 7.1 inches of that in the barrel itself.

In 1850/51 the firm produced some 800 copies of the new revolver, which could be reloaded by simply pressing a latch, raising the barrel and pulling the cylinder forward and off the axis pin. Along with the standard model, another thousand smaller .31-caliber Belt models were manufactured with a shorter barrel.

The new revolvers were embraced by customers. General Winfield Scott, for instance, carried one of the smaller Wesson & Leavitt 32-caliber six-shot revolvers in the Mexican–American War.

== Samuel Colt sues for patent infringement ==
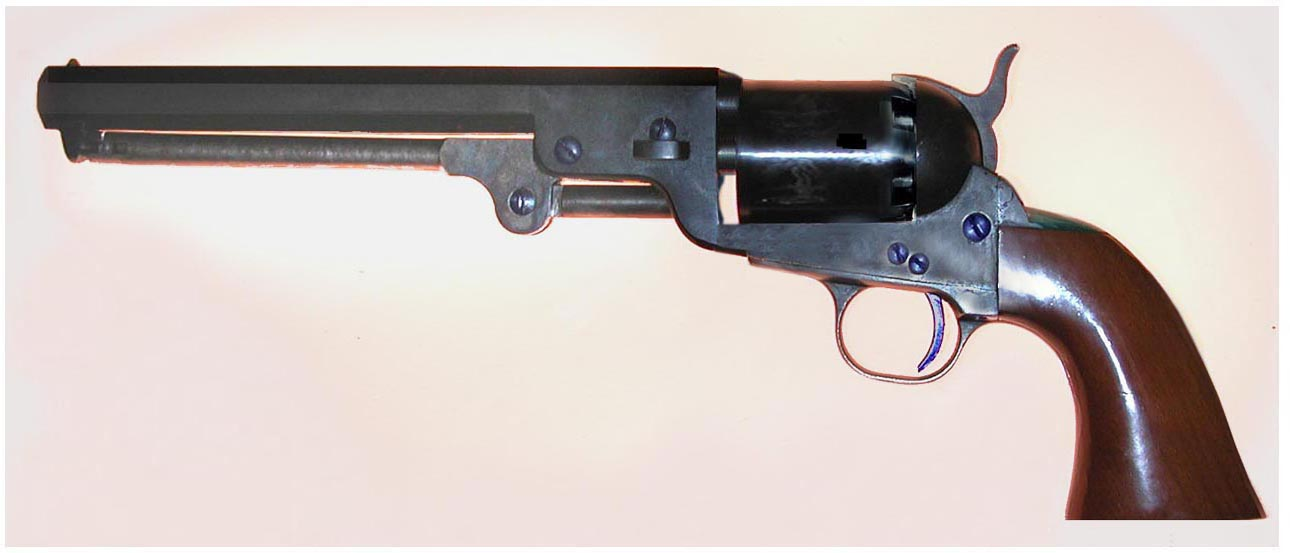
1851 Colt Navy revolver

The success of the fledgling company's weapon soon attracted the attention of Samuel Colt, who sent his cousin Henry Sargeant to purchase one of the revolvers. Emboldened by the recent extension of his original patent until 1857, Colt sued Wesson & Leavitt, now run by Edwin's brother Daniel Wesson, who had gone to work for his brother Edwin in 1843 and who took over after Edwin's 1849 death. Colt's lawsuit alleged infringement of Colt's original patent on the revolver. The case went to trial in October 1852 before the United States circuit court for the District of New York. Both sides alleged tampering with the original U.S. Patent files as well as fraudulent exhibits. The case was extensively covered by the New York City newspapers. A month later, Colt had overwhelmed the tiny manufacturer in court and won large damages. Massachusetts Arms Co. continued to manufacture revolvers based on alternate version of their revolvers with various less useful methods for revolving the cylinder to get around Colt's patents. The original company dissolved after the Civil War in 1866.

Following Colt's victory, his attorney Edward N. Dickerson fired off a circular at the manufacturers in the firearms business. "You will please to take notice," Dickerson wrote, "to desist forthwith from the sale of any REPEATING FIRE ARMS, in which rotation, or locking or releasing, are produced by combining the breech with the lock; or in which the cones are separated by partitions, or set into recesses; except such as are made by Col. Colt, at Hartford."

"Needless to say," write the authors of Samuel Colt: Arms, Art, and Invention, "this circular had a chilling effect on the American arms industry." A number of the firms warned by Dickerson capitulated and paid damages to settle with Colt. But despite this early victory, Colt's attorney warned his client not to persist with his patent infringement suits. "Nothing is easier than to get into a big law suit", said Dickerson, "but there are many easier things than to get out successfully. Your luck, as I suppose you will call it, has hitherto been very good – better than any other inventor in America by far, but it may turn, and another suit may bring out something which we know not of, and which may destroy us...."

Dickerson may have been smarting from confrontations in the U.S. District Court battle, which turned into a jousting match between two of the foremost attorneys of the day: Dickerson representing Colt; and Rufus Choate representing the Massachusetts Arms Company. Nevertheless, it was Dickerson – and his client Colt, who was away on business in Europe during the trial – who came out on top in the first courtroom dust-up.

Despite the warning of Dickerson to his client not to press his luck, Colt's litigious salvos had one effect: they virtually shut down the output of his competitors for several years, and his firm became the largest manufacturer of civilian firearms during the 1850s.

== Aftermath of Colt's litigation ==
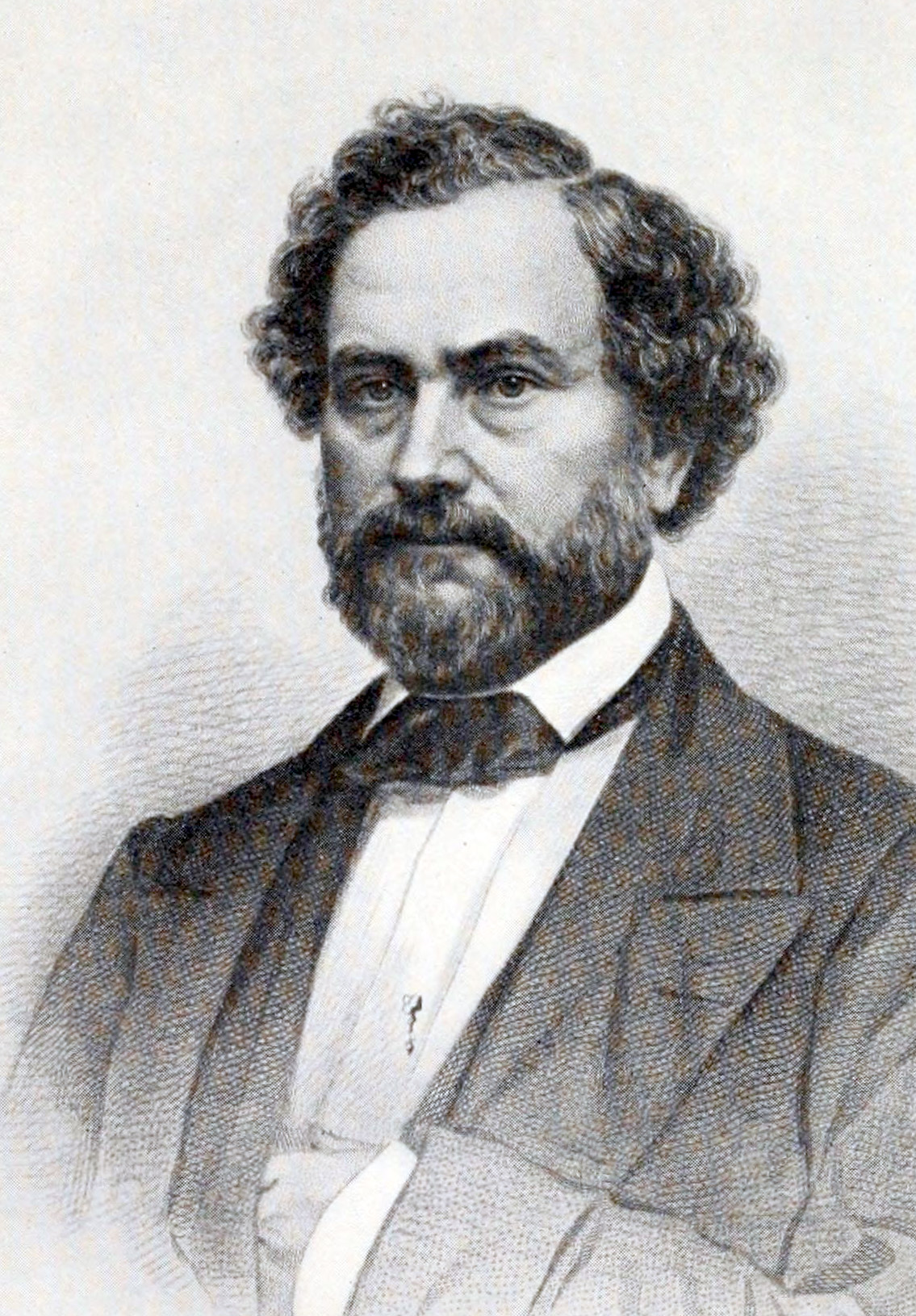
Samuel Colt, firearm manufacturer who crushed his competitors in his patent infringement case in 1852

Altogether the Massachusetts Arms Company – considered a predecessor of arms manufacturer Smith & Wesson – manufactured roughly a thousand of the .31-caliber belt models of the original patented revolver, 200 of which were purchased by the abolitionist Massachusetts-Kansas Aid Committee in 1856. Many of these firearms later found their way to abolitionist John Brown.

The Massachusetts Arms Company continued in business, and after the expiration of some of Samuel Colt's original patents, as well as improvements in the design of its revolvers, the company manufactured an assortment of weapons. (Note: From the beginning Samuel Colt's manufactory had far better distribution than its competitors, and its weapons found their way into the hands of Western frontiersmen in far great numbers than those of its competitors.) Several of its early employees, notably designer Joshua Stevens, went on to found other successful weaponry companies. (The J. Stevens Company, founded by former Wesson & Leavitt employee Stevens, was ultimately sold to New England Westinghouse Company in 1915 to produce military arms (Note: The former J. Stevens Company later became famous for its heavy Browning Machine Rifles.) for World War I).

The early inventor, although eventually crushed by the legal team of arms magnate Samuel Colt, had helped spur competition and drive technological improvements in the design of American pistols – guns later used in the Old West, the American Civil War and elsewhere, and the envy of the world's firearm manufacturers. Leavitt himself served in the Massachusetts Volunteer Militia in 1847 as Captain of Company F, 10th Regiment, 6th Brigade and was a member of the Chicopee Freemasons lodge.

Leavitt did not confine himself to the design of firearms. On August 18, 1842, he was granted a patent (number 2755) for a 'Mode of Securing Bobbins in Shuttles for Weaving'. Leavitt's patent for an innovation for bobbins used in power looms demonstrated that the inventor had his eye on another emerging New England industry. It was an industry in which Leavitt had more than passing interest: his father Benning owned a Chicopee factory that produced bobbins. There is no indication whether Leavitt's patent for textile manufacturing was more successful than his firearm patents.

== Death ==
Leavitt died at Chicopee, Massachusetts on July 27, 1859.
