= Massachusetts Arms Company =

American firearms manufacturer (1849-1930)

- Company type: Private
- Industry: Firearms
- Founded: Chicopee Falls, Massachusetts, United States (1849)
- Defunct: 1866 as an independent concern, 1930 as a trade name
- Fate: Bankruptcy
- Headquarters: Chicopee Falls, Massachusetts, United States
- Key people: Horace Smith, Daniel Wesson
- Products: Firearms
- Footnotes / references Trade name once used by J. Stevens Arms and Tool Company

The Massachusetts Arms Company, of Chicopee Falls, Massachusetts was a 19th century manufacturer of firearms and firearm-related products. The company made a variety of carbines and revolvers in the years leading up to the American Civil War, and was a supplier of weapons to the Union army once the war began.

== History ==
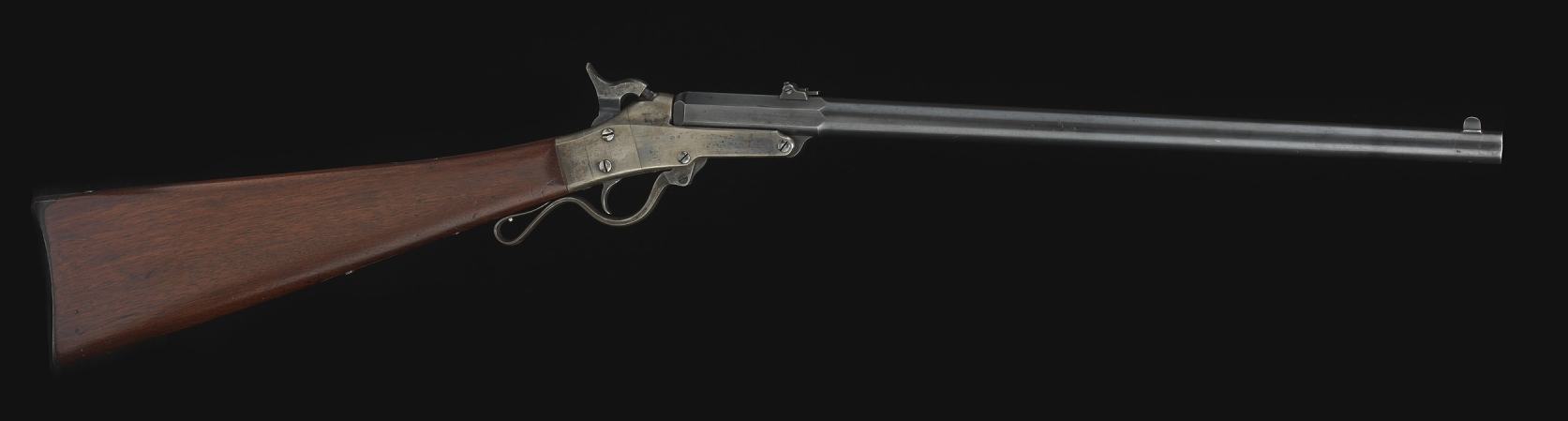
Maynard Carbine manufactured by the Massachusetts Arms Company

The Massachusetts Arms Company was incorporated on March 5, 1850 by Timothy W. Carter, James T. Ames, Daniel B. Wesson, and Benjamin F. Warner.

The company initially made percussion revolvers based on designs created by Daniel Wesson's brother Edwin and Daniel Leavitt. However, this led to a patent infringement lawsuit by Samuel Colt, who successfully obtained an injunction against the Massachusetts Arms Company to stop them from making revolvers that infringed on Colt's designs. After Colt's patent expired the company resumed manufacturing revolvers, and in 1857 the company sold 200 revolvers to abolitionist John Brown at a discount, in support of his activities during the Bleeding Kansas events.

In the 1850s through the American Civil War period, the company received contracts to manufacture the Maynard carbine, Adams revolver, and Greene carbine. Most of the initial pre-war production run of the first model Maynard carbines were purchased by Southern states and used by Confederate cavalry regiments.

The company also produced single- and double-barrel shotguns, including both box-locks and external central hammers. Later it manufactured a selection of 20- and 28-bore Maynard-action shotguns of 1865 and 1873 patterns.

The Chicopee Falls factory burned down in January 1861, halting production until the factory was rebuilt in 1863. The company then received an order for 20,000 of the simpler Second Model Maynard carbines, and they saw service with various Union cavalry regiments during the later phases of the war. The advent of the repeating rifle caused a downturn in sales for the breechloading rifle designs the company was known for, and Massachusetts Arms went bankrupt after the end of the war.

In 1893 the company was purchased by the J Stevens Arms & Tool Company, also founded by Joshua Stevens. Stevens had left the Massachusetts Arms Company in 1864. The purchase was made to protect the interests of Edward Maynard's widow and provide security for the company's workers.

In the late 19th century the company began producing revolvers on various Smith & Wesson patterns. Production continued until the factory closed permanently during the Great Depression. The Massachusetts Arms Company name was retained by Stevens and later used as a trade name for firearms produced for sale at the Blish, Mize and Silliman Hardware Company of Atchison, Kansas.

== Products ==
Weapons produced by the Massachusetts Arms Company:

- Adams revolver
- Green carbine
- Maynard carbine
- Smith carbine
- Wesson & Leavitt revolver
