= Maynard tape primer =

Primer system designed by Edward Maynard

The Maynard tape primer was a system designed by Edward Maynard to allow for more rapid reloading of muskets, used on the Springfield Model 1855, before it was abandoned in favor of conventional copper percussion caps in 1860 due to reliability problems under bad weather conditions. Variations of the tape primer are used in modern toy cap guns.

== History ==
Muskets in the early 19th century were flintlocks, which had a high rate of misfire and performed poorly in damp and humid weather. In 1807 the first percussion ignition system was patented by Alexander Forsyth based on research on fulminates conducted by Edward Charles Howard, but practical percussion lock systems did not become available until the 1820s, after Forsyth's patent had expired.

While copper caps filled with mercury fulminate proved to be safe and reliable by the late 1820s, several gunmakers and inventors still worked on alternatives that were easier to handle, as a soldier had to manually insert small copper caps for every bullet; as early as 1821, a tape primer system was patented by the French inventor de Valdehon. In 1834, another Frenchman, Charles Louis Stanislas Heurteloup filled a patent for a system similar to de Valdehon's, in which the gun hammer simultaneously cut off small strips and detonated the primer off a long tube or tape primer (l'amorce continué) made of a soft metal alloy of lead, zinc, and tin, positioned on the gun's breech, which he named the Koptipteur. The Koptipteur was improved several times between 1837–1841, tested by the British in 1837 and 1842, and ultimately rejected for introduction in the British army, though it saw limited adoption by the French, Belgian, and Russian armies; while in Sweden a locally developed version of the Koptipteur was less successful, with the only known examples being the guns presented to King Frederick VI of Denmark in 1838. Heurteloup unsuccessfully attempted to use a small, teethed wheel to automatically crank up the tape roll when the gun was cocked.

In 1839, a design featuring a box containing a coil of tape primer with a cutting and striking hammer based on the Koptipteur that could be easily be fitted into a conventional flintlock musket was patented in Paris by M. Martin, an improvement that was copied by Heurteloup in his British patent of 1841 and Belgian patent of 1843 (under the name of Sigrist), while another French inventor Augustin Thibert filled a patent in 1842 on similar lines. All these tape primer designs had a tendency of burning the entire strip like a slow match if the cutting hammer blow failed to cleanly cut off a portion of the tape primer. A problem that would be solved by Dr. Edward Maynard in his 1854 patent.

Maynard embedded tiny pellets of priming material in thin strips of paper (less bulkier than the metal strips used in Europe) at regular intervals, then glued a second strip of paper on top of the first, to seal the fulminate powder. He also designed a simplified and improved feeding system to go along with his paper tapes. Maynard claimed that his tape primer was cheaper than conventional percussion caps, costing 10–20 cents (equivalent to $3–7 in 2025) per thousand in comparison to $1 (equivalent to $33 in 2025) per thousand copper caps, and safer to use as his system automatically cranked the primers in place while soldiers had to manually fit a percussion cap possibly with cold hands or under stress of combat.

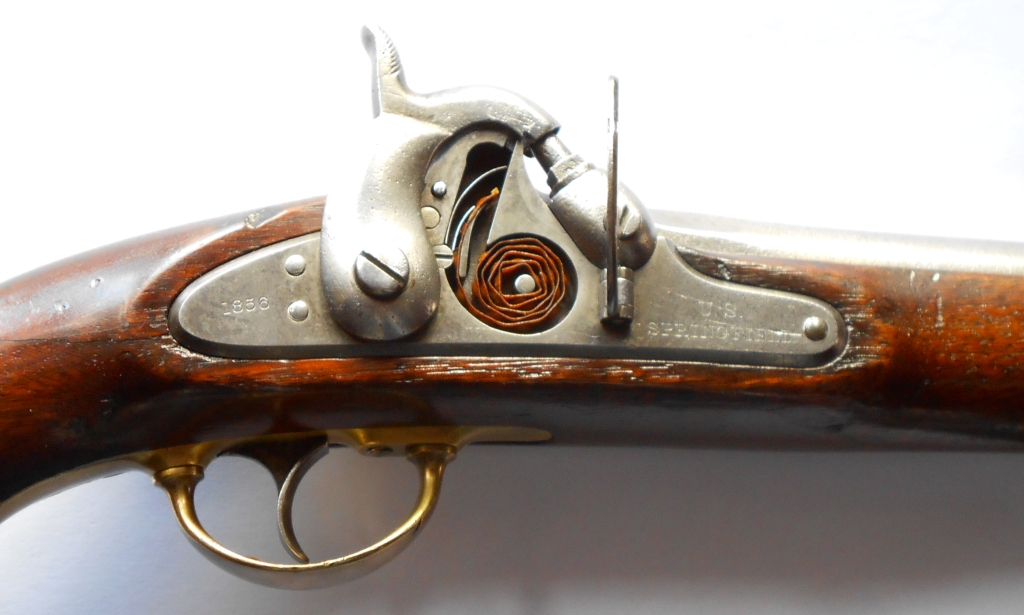
Springfield Model 1855 with Maynard tape primer mechanism

In 1845, the United States Ordnance Department gave Maynard a contract of $4,000 (equivalent to $131,277 in 2025) to convert a total of 4,000 muskets to use his tape primer system, with the first conversions being 200 Springfield Model 1840 flintlock muskets for test trials. On 9 February 1848, an additional order for 1,000 conversions were made at the cost of $3 (equivalent to $90 in 2025) per gun, and on 22 November 1848 another batch of 1,000 guns were converted for $4 (equivalent to $120 in 2025) each. After Jefferson Davis took the post of Secretary of War, he ordered further trials with the Maynard's tape primer, subsequently approving an additional payment of $50,000 (equivalent to $1,405,011 in 2025) on 3 February 1854 for the right of unrestricted use of Maynard's design on all US Army and US Navy firearms, most notably the Springfield Model 1855 rifled musket. Combat experience proved that the Maynard tape was unreliable under field conditions and subsequent versions of the Model 1855 rifled musket reverted to using conventional copper primers.

The Maynard tape priming system was also used into some Sharps rifle models—including the M1850 and M1855 rifles, and the M1851 carbine—all marked "Edward Maynard Patentee 1845", Jenks carbines produced by E. Remington & Sons in 1847–1848, some revolvers produced by the Massachusetts Arms Company between 1851 and 1860, the first version of the Maynard carbine, sporting rifles and carbines, and experimentally applied to M1836/1842 flintlock pistols. Functionally, Maynard's priming system is similar to modern toy cap guns.

== Design ==
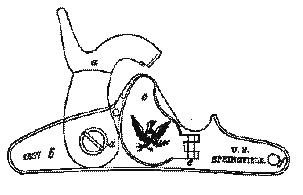
Diagram of a Springfield Model 1855 Musket's lock mechanism. The small plate with the eagle on it is the cover for the Maynard tape system.

Maynard's priming system used a roll of tape with primer patches embedded throughout its length that was fed into a pan covered with a hinged lid. As the roll was threaded over the percussion lock's nipple, the cutting edge of the hammer sliced off the tape, readying the gun to fire. Once fired, the system automatically positioned another cap for the next shot.

This mechanism still required the musket's powder and Minié ball to be loaded conventionally into the barrel, but the tape system meant that the percussion cap no longer needed to be manually loaded onto the nipple. This saved the soldier a step during the reloading process, increasing overall rate of fire. According to author William B. Edwards, Jefferson Davis approval of Maynard's design was possibly influenced by the difficulties his volunteers experienced loading their rifles with conventional copper caps during the Mexican–American War.

The Maynard tape worked well as long as the tapes were kept dry, proving to be fragile in comparison to copper caps, and unreliable under bad weather conditions, prone to misfire when wet. In 1860, the Maynard system was deemed by the War Department as unreliable and abandoned.

The Springfield M1855 was designed to use either the Maynard system or standard percussion caps, remaining functional even with the problems of the Maynard system, though subsequent versions only accept conventional copper caps. Its successor, the Springfield Model 1861 only used copper cap primers.

== Gallery ==
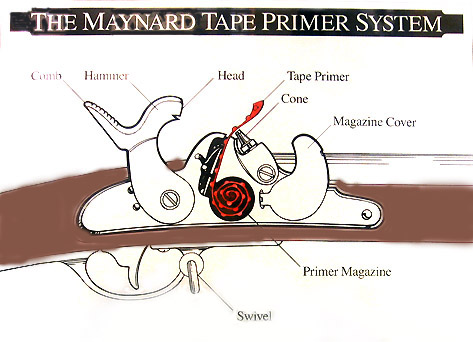
Diagram of the Maynard tape primer system

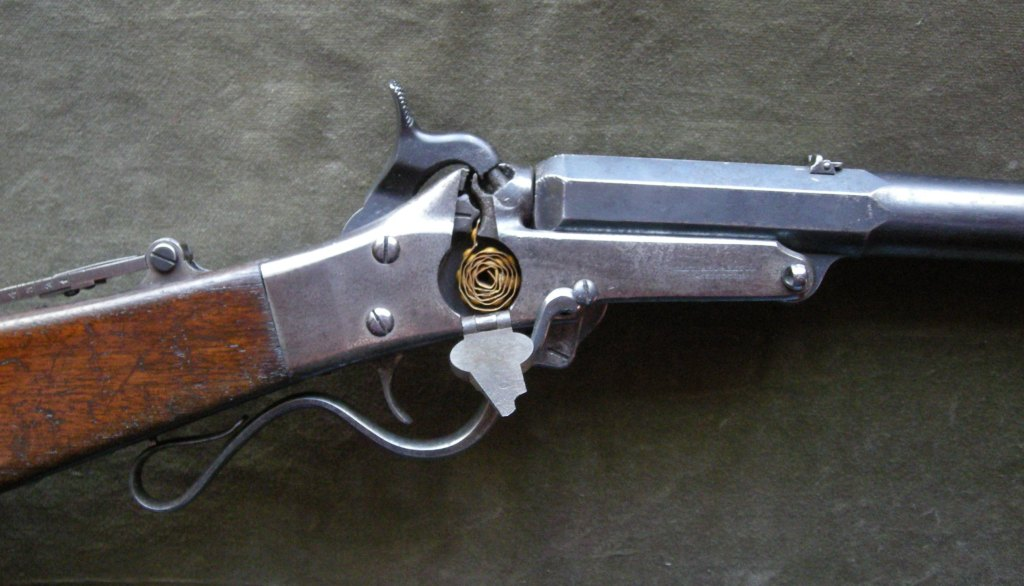
Maynard carbine, tape-primer

Model 1855 pistol-carbine with a Maynard tape primer
