= Smith carbine =

Smith Carbine
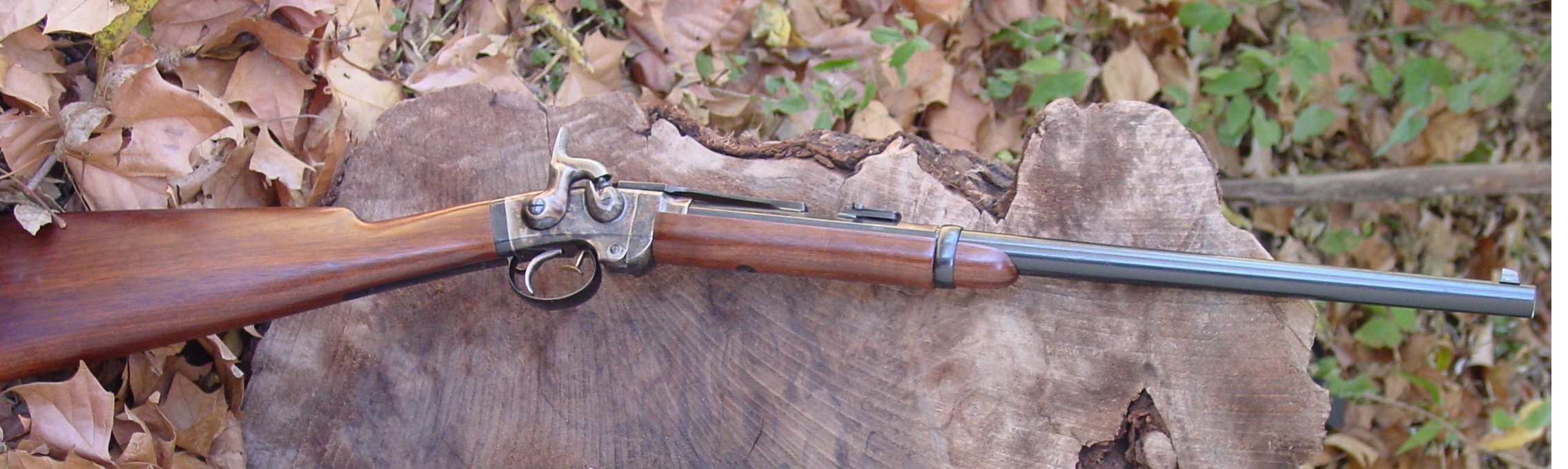
- Type: Carbine
- Place of origin: United States

Service history
- Used by: United States; Argentina
- Wars: American Civil War; Paraguayan War; Argentine Civil Wars

Production history
- Designer: Gilbert Smith
- Designed: 1857
- Manufacturer: Massachusetts Arms Company
- Unit cost: $35 (1859), $32,5 (1861)
- No. built: 30,062

Specifications
- Mass: 7.5 lb (3.4 kg)
- Length: 39.5 in (1,000 mm)
- Barrel length: 21.6 in (550 mm)
- Caliber: .50
- Action: Break-action
- Sights: Blade (front); Block and single Leaf sight (rear)

The Smith Carbine was a .50 caliber breech-loading black powder percussion rifle patented by Gilbert Smith on June 23, 1857 and successfully completed the military trials of the late 1850s. It was used by various cavalry units during the American Civil War.

The Smith Carbine was unique in that it broke apart in the middle for loading and it used rubber and paper/brass foil cartridges which sealed the gases in the breech. The downside was that these rubber cartridges were sometimes difficult to remove from a hot breech.

The carbines were built by Massachusetts Arms Company of Chicopee Falls, Massachusetts; the American Machine Works in Springfield, Massachusetts; or the American Arms Company in Chicopee Falls. The name of the distributor for the manufacturer, Poultney & Trimble of Baltimore, Maryland, is often stamped on the carbine's receivers.

== Smith Carbine Replica ==
Italian gun manufacturer F.LLI Pietta produced a fairly good quality Smith Carbine replica in "Artillery" and "Cavalry" (with saddle ring) versions. Although it seems, after a final production run in 2024, F.LLI Pietta stopped the production of the Smith Carbine. As of late 2024, they are still available in small numbers from several vendors in Europe.

== Smith Carbine Cartridge ==
Modern reusable cartridges cases are available from several manufacturers made from polyamide (black, contains 30-35 grain BP), polyurethane rubber (transparent red, with brass flash hole liner, 35-40 grain BP) and turned brass (various models, 30-50 grain BP). It is also relatively easy to build period correct one-way paper cartridge cases from packaging paper and strong aluminium foil (sourced from beer or soda cans).

While the thick walled, turned brass cartridges last almost indefinitely and can be easily reloaded, they don't provide an almost 100% gas seal like the "plastic" and paper cartridges. According to users, the reusable "plastic" cartridge cases last about 15-20 shots (similar to modern drawn cartridge cases).

== Smith Carbine bullets ==
Period correct Smith Carbine bullet moulds are available from Eras Gone Bullets and others. The Smith Carbine bullets have about .515 diameter (13,1mm) and weight about 365 grains. To fit the brass cases, the bullets have to be sized to .508-.510 diameter (12,9-12,95mm).

== Service history ==
Early versions are often known to modern collectors as artillery models, but all Smiths were issued to cavalry units. Units known to have received the Smith Carbine include:

- 1st Connecticut Cavalry Regiment
- 7th Illinois Cavalry Regiment
- 11th Illinois Cavalry Regiment
- 1st Massachusetts Cavalry Regiment
- 10th New York Cavalry Regiment
- 6th Ohio Cavalry Regiment
- 9th Ohio Cavalry Regiment
- 7th Pennsylvania Cavalry Regiment
- 17th Pennsylvania Cavalry Regiment
- 3rd West Virginia Cavalry Regiment
- 1st Alabama Cavalry Regiment (Union)
- Hatch's Minnesota Cavalry Battalion

In 1865 the Argentine Armed Forces acquired through Schuyler, Hartley & Graham around 400 examples to be used by cavalry and other forces in the fight against the Indians and the rebellions in the interior. A few were sent to the front in Paraguay.

In 1871, 371 were issued to line forces and four to the borders. Some were used on the western frontier, .50 Smith bullets were exacated at Fort General Paz (today Carlos Casares).

They remained in use for line forces up to 1874 (the last inventory of the Artillery Park where they are mentioned dates from 1874), afterwards they were used by the Guardia National of Buenos Aires and other Buenos Aires volunteer forces until 1881.

== See also ==
- Rifles in the American Civil War
