= Maynard carbine =

Rifle of the American Civil War

Maynard Carbine
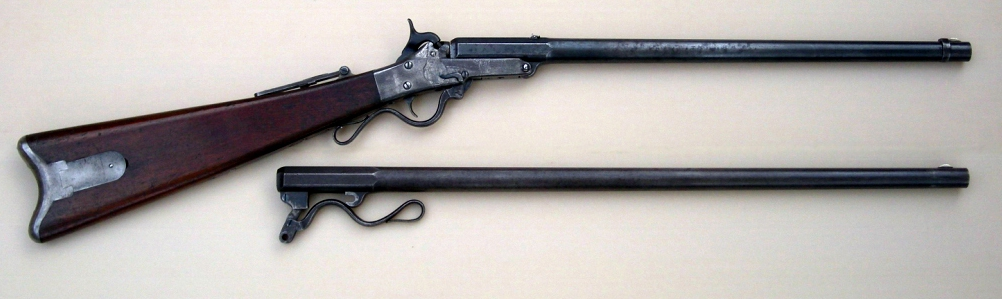
- Maynard carbine, the short barrel is for 50 caliber rounds and the longer barrel is for 35 caliber
- Type: Carbine
- Place of origin: United States

Service history
- Used by: United States; Confederate States; Argentina (Limited)
- Wars: American Civil War

Production history
- Designer: Edward Maynard
- Designed: 1851
- Manufacturer: Massachusetts Arms Company
- Produced: 1860–1869
- No. built: 21,000+

Specifications
- Length: 40 in (1,000 mm)
- Barrel length: 21.5 in (550 mm)
- Caliber: .50, .52, .35
- Action: Breech-loaded, lever-action
- Rate of fire: 12 rounds per minute
- Maximum firing range: 600 yd (550 m)

The Maynard carbine was a breech-loaded carbine used by cavalry in the American Civil War. Designed by dentist Edward Maynard, the initial production run between 1858 and 1859 was mostly purchased by the Southern states that would go on to form the Confederacy in 1861. The later 1863 model entered mass production in 1863 and was mainly used by Union forces.

== Design ==
The inventor of the weapon, Dr. Edward Maynard, was a dentist and skilled engineer who designed and manufactured much of his own dentistry equipment. Maynard patented the breechloading design of his carbine in 1851, and it was trialed by the US Army in 1856. Other early breechloaders often had problems with gas escaping from the breech, an issue Maynard resolved by introducing a wide-rimmed metal cartridge that formed a better seal when the breech was closed.

== Mechanical operation ==
When the gun's lever was depressed, the barrel rose, opening the breech. The Maynard cartridge was loaded in, and then the lever was raised to close the gun's breech. The first model used a spooled primer tape system (invented by Maynard and used in some other firearms of the period) built into the stock, the 1863 model was compatible with percussion caps.

The brass Maynard cartridge did not have an integral percussion cap. The cartridge had a small hole in it, when either the primer tape or percussion cap was struck by the gun's hammer, the resulting spark travelled through the hole in the base of the cartridge to ignite the powder inside. The cartridge, which had a wide rim permitting swift extraction, was reloadable up to 100 times. This proved to be a significant feature for the Confederate troops equipped with the Maynard Carbine, as the South lacked advanced industrial manufacturing facilities.

== Gallery ==
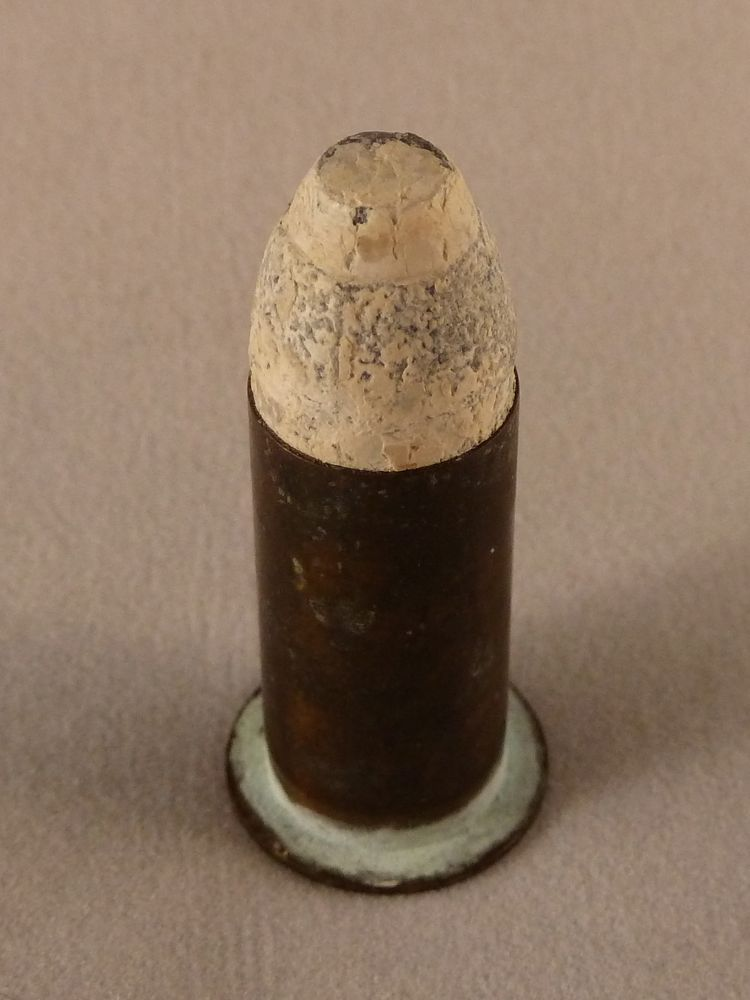
An unfired Maynard 52 caliber cartridge

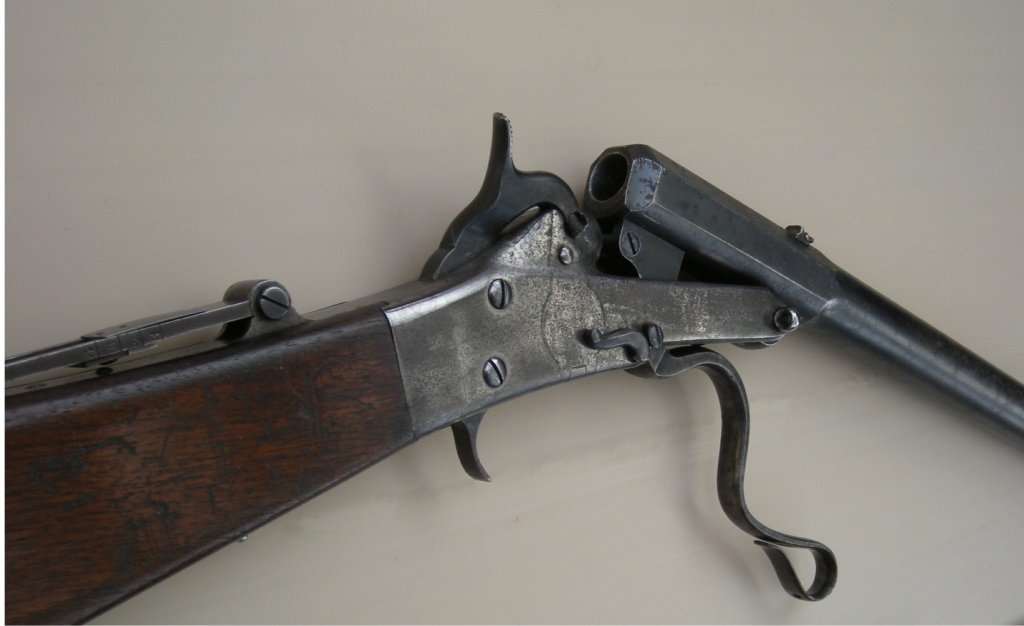
Maynard carbine, break action, serial # 4815

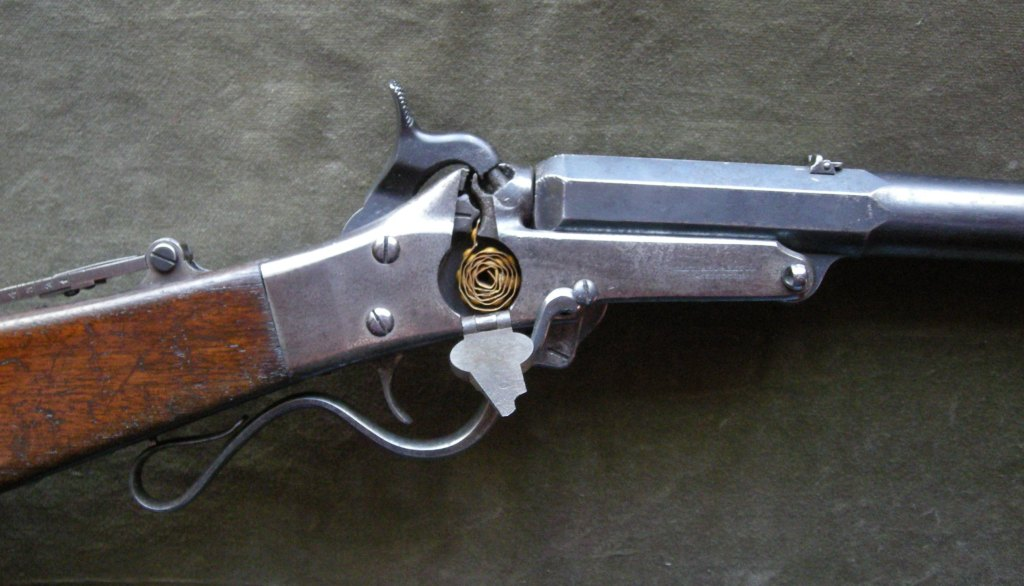
First model Maynard carbine system with Maynard tape-primer

== Production and operational history ==
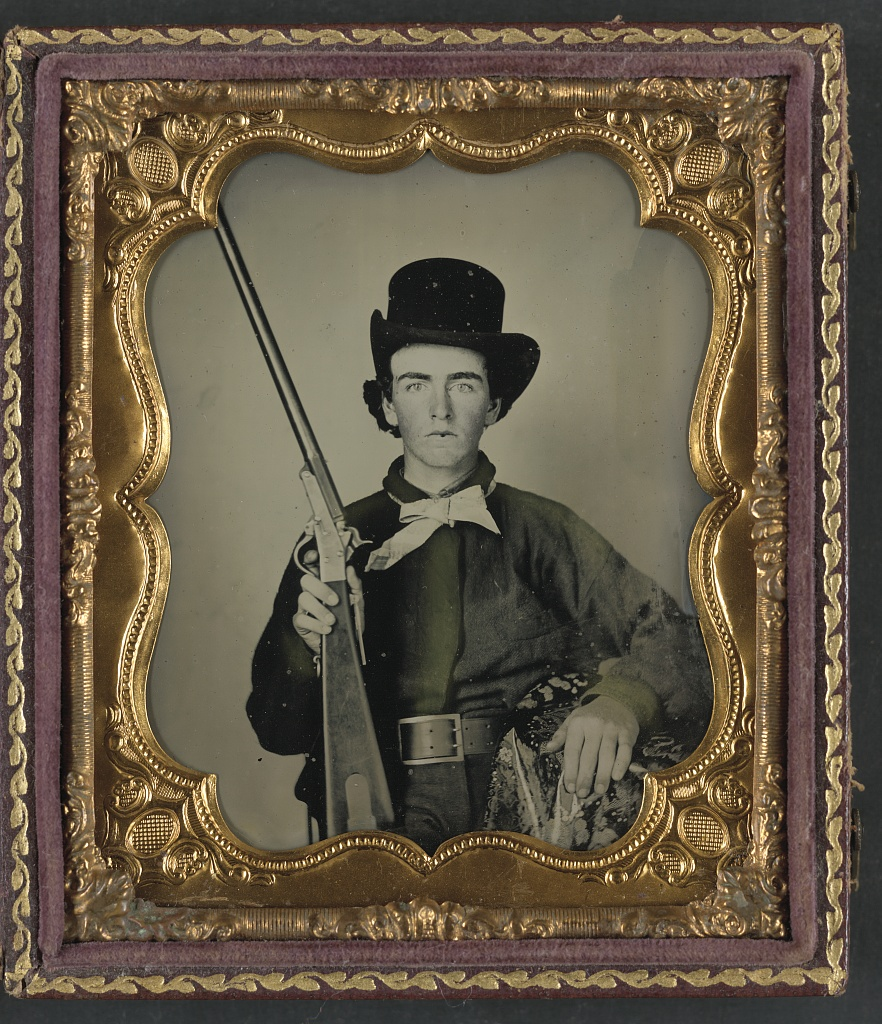
Confederate soldier of the 1st Mississippi Cavalry holding a first model Maynard carbine.

The first model of the carbine was manufactured from 1858-1859, with approximately 5,000 weapons produced. The inventor formed his own company, the Maynard Arms Company, but most of the production was done under contract by the Massachusetts Arms Company. The initial users were the US revenue cutter service and Navy. During the Civil War, on the Union side the first model Maynard carbines were issued to the 4th US Cavalry, 9th Pennsylvania Cavalry, and 1st Wisconsin Cavalry.

However, the majority of the first model Maynards went to Southern states, either purchased by private buyers or by the states themselves as tensions rose leading up to the 1860 United States presidential election. Even after the secession crisis began, Southern purchasing agents were still buying large numbers of weapons like Maynards from Northern factories until hostilities broke out in April 1861. Florida, Mississippi, Georgia, and South Carolina purchased Maynards, and Confederate units who carried Maynards during the war included the 2nd Florida Cavalry, Cobb's (Georgia) Legion, 1st Mississippi Cavalry, and 2nd Florida Infantry.

The Second Model or Model 1863 was manufactured between 1863 and 1865, with a much larger production run of over 20,000 units. This model lacked the tape primer and stock patch box, relying on percussion caps instead. Since the 1863 model was manufactured in the North, it was not available to Confederate units as the first model had been, other than those that were captured on the battlefield. While the first model was made in various calibres, the 1863 model was only produced as .50 calibre. Regiments issued with the 1863 model included the 9th and 11th Indiana cavalry regiments and 11th Tennessee Cavalry, among other Union units.

The Maynard carbine was one of the most-accurate breechloading carbines used in the war. It was highly praised by the soldiers – Private Toby of the 1st Mississippi Cavalry stated that it was "warranted to shoot twelve times a minute, and carry a ball effectually 1600 yards. Nothing to do with Maynard rifle but load her up, turn her North, and pull trigger; if twenty of them don't clean out all Yankeedom, then I'm a liar, that's all."

After the war, the bankruptcy of the Massachusetts Arms Company and the advent of the repeating rifle led to the obsolescence of breech-loaders.

== See also ==
- Rifles in the American Civil War
