= 4th Indiana Volunteer Cavalry Regiment =

Union unit from the American Civil War

4th Indiana Cavalry Regiment (77th Indiana Infantry Regiment)
- Active: August 22, 1862 – June 29, 1865
- Country: United States
- Allegiance: Union
- Branch: Infantry & Cavalry
- Engagements: American Civil War: Confederate Heartland Offensive; Battle of Munfordville; Battle of Stones River; Yazoo Pass Expedition (Company C); Battle of Chickasaw Bayou (Company C); Battle of Arkansas Post (Company C); Battle of Grand Gulf (Company C); Battle of Port Gibson (Company C); Battle of Champion Hill; Siege of Vicksburg (Company C); Battle of Jackson (Company C); Bayou Teche Campaign (Company C); Tullahoma Campaign; Chattanooga campaign; Battle of Chickamauga; Battle of Bayou Bourbeux (Company C); Battle of Mossy Creek; Battle of Fair Garden; Atlanta campaign; Battle of Varnell's Station; Battle of New Hope Church; Shermans March to the Sea; Battle of Columbia; Wilson's Raid; Battle of Ebenezer Church; Battle of Selma

Commanders
- Colonel: Isaac P. Gray
- Notable commanders: John T. Deweese

The 4th Indiana Cavalry Regiment was a cavalry regiment during the American Civil War. It was originally mustered as an infantry regiment as the 77th Indiana Infantry Regiment.

== Service ==
The 77th Indiana Infantry Regiment was organized in Indianapolis on August 22, 1862, with Isaac P. Gray elected as the regiment's Colonel. While organizinbg, it was redesignated the 4th Indiana Volunteer Cavalry and Like other volunbteer cavalry regiments of 1862, it was recruited as a twelve company regiment organized into three battalions as opposed to troops and squadrons of U.S. regular cavalry.. The first two battalions, each with its own commander. Major John A. Platter along with 4 companies were sent to Henderson, Kentucky, while the remaining companies were sent to the interior of Kentucky under Colonel Gray. For much of its early history the regiment served as reconnaissance against John Hunt Morgan who still threatened Kentucky with many bushwhacker and guerrilla warfare attacks. Platter's battalion engaged with Confederate troops in a skirmish near Madisonville, Kentucky on August 26, 1862, and again at Mount Washington, Kentucky on October 1, 1862. On October 5, 1862, Platter's battalion again engaged with Confederate troops at Madisonville. In the Spring of 1863 Platter's battalion joined the rest of the regiment, excluding Company C which was detached to the Western Theater. During the Confederate Heartland Offensive the regiment fought at the Battle of Munfordville and again at Battle of Stones River. The regiment later joined General William Rosecrans during the Tullahoma campaign and the Chattanooga campaign and participated in the Battle of Chickamauga. During the winter of 1863-1864 the regiment took part in the Battle of Mossy Creek where the regiment was lauded for its participation by divisional commanders. Remaining in Col Daniel M. Ray's 2nd Brigade in Col Edward M. McCook's 1st Division in Brig. Gen. Robert B. Mitchell's Cavalry Corps after the retreat to Chattanooga, it fought at Fayetteville, TN, during the lifting of the siege.

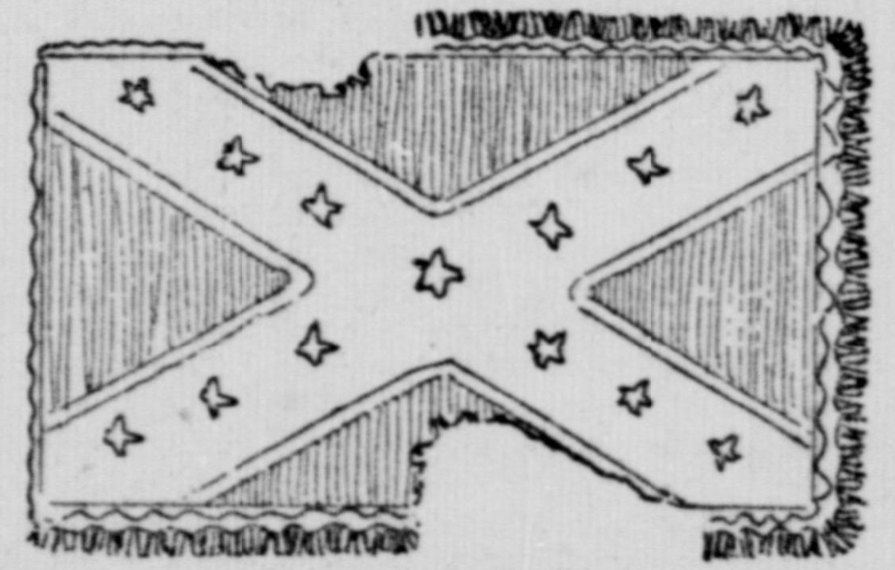
John Hunt Morgan's personal Battle flag captured by the regiment

On January 27, 1864, the regiment took part in the Battle of Fair Garden. During the Battle of Fair Garden the Second battalion under Captain Rosencrantz along with the 2nd Indiana Cavalry Regiment and 1st Wisconsin Cavalry Regiment dismounted as skirmishers and charged the Confederate defenses supported by Eli Lilly's 18th Independent Battery Indiana Light Artillery. In March 1864 the regiment arrived in Cleveland, Tennessee and in May moved with William Tecumseh Sherman's Army of the Tennessee and Army of Georgia during Sherman's March to the Sea. The regiment fought at the Battle of Varnell's Station during the Atlanta campaign and skirmished with Confederate troops at the Battle of New Hope Church. Following the capture of Atlanta the regiment marched into Tennessee and engaged with Confederate forces at the Battle of Columbia in October. The regiment was later stationed near Louisville, Kentucky and was later moved to Nashville, Tennessee and then Waterloo, Alabama. The regiment later took part in Wilson's Raid, the Battle of Ebenezer Church, and the Battle of Selma.

Following the Battle of Selma the regiment returned to Macon, Georgia and alter to Nashville and went into the Provisional Cavalry Camp at Edgefield, Tennessee, where it remained until the regiment was mustered out of service on June 29, 1862. After mustering out the regiment remained in Nashville until all men were discharged and received their money for service in the Union Army.

For the entirety of the war Company C of the regiment served as a detachment belonging to the Headquarters of Union General Andrew Jackson Smith and was attached to the 10th Division of the Union Army's XIII Corps of the Army of the Tennessee. Company C participated in the following engagements: the Yazoo Pass expedition, the Battle of Chickasaw Bayou, the Battle of Arkansas Post, provided reconnaissance at the Battle of Grand Gulf, the Battle of Port Gibson, the Battle of Champion Hill, the Siege of Vicksburg, the Battle of Jackson, the Bayou Teche campaign, Expedition from Opelousas, Louisiana to Barre Landing, the Battle of Grand Coteau, and provost duty in New Orleans.

Original Organization of Regiment
Company	Primary Place of Recruitment	Earliest Captain
A	Hendricks County and Marion County	Lawrence S. Shuler
B	No cities or counties given	John A. Platter
C	Warsaw and Kosciusko County	Joseph P. Leslie
D	Clark and Floyd counties	Warren Horr
E	La Porte County	Nathan Earlywine
F	Pike, Gibson, and Vanderburg counties	John T. Deweese
G	Lawrence County	Jesse W. Keithley
H	No cities or counties given	George H. Purdy
I	Warrick, Montgomery, Tippecanoe, Clinton, Morgan, and Boone counties	John Austin
K	Parke County	Christopher C. Mason
L	No cities or counties given	Josiah Hartley
M	No cities or counties given	Jonas Seely

== Affiliations, battle honors, detailed service, and casualties ==
=== Organizational affiliation ===
The 98th Illinois Volunteer Infantry Regiment was organized at Centralia, IL, and served with the following organizations:

- Unattached Army of Kentucky, Department of the Ohio
- November, 1862, District of Western Kentucky, Department of the Ohio
- March, 1863. 2nd Brigade, 1st Cavalry Division, Cavalry Corps, Army of the Cumberland (AoC)
- October, 1864. 2nd Brigade, 1st Division Cavalry Corps, Cavalry Corps, Military Division of the Mississippi

Co. "C" served detached as of October, 1862:

- Headquarters of Brig. Gen. Andrew J. Smith
- August, 1863, Cavalry Brigade, XIII Corps, Department of the Gulf
- September, 1863, 2nd Brigade, Cavalry Division, Department of the Gulf
- November, 1863, 3rd Brigade, Cavalry Division, Department of the Gulf
- January, 1864, 1st Brigade, Cavalry Division, Department of the Gulf
- June, 1864, Unattached, Department of the Gulf
- September, 1864, rejoined regiment

=== List of battles ===
The official list of battles in which the regiment bore a part:

- Battle of Chickamauga
- Siege of Chattanooga
- Battle of Missionary Ridge
- Battle of Mossy Creek
- Battle of Dandridge
- Battle of Atlanta
- Battle of Fair Garden
- Battle of Resaca
- Battle of New Hope Church
- Battle of Kennesaw Mountain
- Battle of Jonesborough
- Battle of Selma

==== Company C ====
- Battle of Arkansas Post
- Battle of Grand Gulf
- Battle of Port Gibson
- Battle of Champion Hill

=== Detailed service ===
==== 1862 ====
- Actions at Madisonville, Ky., August 25 and September 5, 1862 (4 companies)
- Lebanon Junction, Ky., September 21
- Floyd's Forks October 1
- Bardstown Pike, near Mt. Washington, Ky., October 1
- Madisonville October 5
- Duty in Western Kentucky until January, 1863
- Operations against Morgan December 22, 1862, to January 2, 1863
- Bear Wallow December 23
- Munfordsville December 25
- Burksville Road, near Green's Chapel, December 25

==== 1863 ====
- Ordered to Murfreesboro, Tenn. January, 1863
- Near Murfreesboro January 21
- Expedition to Auburn, Liberty and Alexandria February 3–5
- Franklin April 10
- Triune June 9 and 11
- Tullahoma Campaign June 23 – July 7
- Eaglesville and Rover June 23
- Middleton June 24
- Guy's Gap, Fosterville and Shelbyville June 27
- Bethpage Bridge, Elk River, July 1
- Expedition to Huntsville July 13–22
- Chickamauga (Ga.) Campaign August 16 – September 22
- Reconnaissance toward Rome, Ga., September 11
- Alpine September 12
- Dirt Town, Lafayette road, near Chattooga River September 13
- Reconnaissance from Lee and Gordon's Mills toward Lafayette, and Skirmish, September 13
- Near Summerville September 13
- Near Stevens' Gap September 18
- Battle of Chickamauga September 19–21
- Operations against Wheeler and Roddy September 29 – October 17
- Valley Road, near Jasper, October 2
- Scout to Fayetteville October 29 – November 2
- Fayetteville November 1
- Chattanooga-Ringgold Campaign November 23–27
- March to relief of Knoxville November 28 – December 8
- Mossy Creek Station December 24
- Peck's House, near New Market, December 24
- Operations about Dandridge and Mossy Creek December 24–28
- Mossy Creek December 26
- Talbot's Station December 28
- Mossy Creek, Talbot's Station. December 29

==== 1864 ====
- Near Mossy Creek January 11–12, 1864 (Detachment)
- Operations about Dandridge January 16–17, 1864
- Bend of Chucky Road, near Dandridge, January 16
- Dandridge January 17
- Operations about Dandridge January 26–28
- Fair Garden January 27
- Swann's Island January 28
- Reconnaissance toward Seviersville February 1–2
- Dandridge February 17
- Atlanta (Ga.) Campaign May to September
- Demonstrations on Dalton May 9–13
- Tilton May 13
- Battle of Resaca May 14–15
- Advance on Dallas May 18–25
- Stilesboro May 23
- Burnt Hickory May 24
- Operations on line of Pumpkin Vine Creek and battles about Dallas, New Hope Church and Allatoona Hills May 25 – June 5
- Near Burned Church May 26 and May 30 – June 1
- Ackworth June 3–4
- Big Shanty June 6
- Ackworth June 10
- Operations about Marietta and against Kenesaw Mountain June 10 – July 2
- Allatoona June 15
- Lost Mountain June 15–17
- Assault on Kenesaw June 27
- On line of Nickajack Creek July 2–5
- Chattahoochie River July 5–17
- Siege of Atlanta July 22 – August 25
- McCook's Raid on Atlanta and West Point R. R. July 27–31
- Campbellton July 28
- Lovejoy Station July 29
- Clear Creek and Newnan's July 30
- Expedition to Jasper August 11–15
- Flank movement on Jonesboro August 25–30
- Rousseau's pursuit of Wheeler September 24 – October 18
- Pulaski September 26–27
- Operations against Hood until November
- Ordered to Louisville, Ky., and duty there refitting until December
- Pursuit of Lyons from Paris to Hopkinsville, Ky., December 6, 1864, to January 15, 1865
- Action at Hopkinsville December 16, 1864

==== 1865 ====
- At Nashville, Tenn., until February, 1865
- At Waterloo, Ala., until March
- Wilson's Raid to Macon, Ga., March 22 – April 24
- Centreville April 2
- Selma April 2
- Montgomery April 12
- Columbus Road, near Tuskegee, April 14
- Fort Tyler, West Point, April 16
- Near Opelika April 16
- Near Barnesville April 19
- Capture of Macon April 20
- Duty at Macon until May and at Nashville and Edgefield, Tenn., until June
- Mustered out June 29, 1865.

==== Company C on detached duty 1862 ====
- Movement to Memphis, Tenn., November, 1862
- Sherman's Yazoo Expedition December 20, 1862, to January 3, 1863
- Chickasaw Bayou and Bluff December 26–29

==== Company C on detached duty 1863 ====
- Expedition to Arkansas Post, Ark., January 3–10, 1863
- Capture of Fort Hindman, Arkansas Post, January 10–11
- Reconnaissance to White River and St. Charles January 13, 1863
- Moved to Young's Point, La., January 17
- Duty there and at Milliken's Bend until April
- Movement on Bruinsburg and turning Grand Gulf April 25–30
- Battle of Port Gibson May 1
- Battle of Champion's Hill May 16
- Siege of Vicksburg, Miss., May 18 – July 4
- Advance on Jackson, Miss., July 4–10
- Near Baker's Creek July 7
- Bolton's Depot and near Clinton July 8
- Jackson July 9
- Siege of Jackson July 10–17
- Brookhaven July 18
- Moved to New Orleans, La., August
- Western Louisiana Campaign October 3 – November 30
- Reconnaissance toward Opelousas October 20
- Opelousas and Barre Landing October 21
- Grand Coteau November 3
- Duty in defenses of New Orleans until September 1, 1864, when it rejoined the regiment.

=== Casualties ===
Regiment lost during service included 3 officers and 25 enlisted men killed and mortally wounded, and 5 officers and 193 enlisted men killed by disease, with a total of 226.

== Commanders ==
- Colonel Isaac P. Gray, of Union City, IN - Took command September 4, 1862 - resigned February 11, 1863
- Colonel Lawrence S. Shuler, of Danville, IN - Took command February 12, 1863 - resigned May 16, 1863 due to disability
- Colonel John A. Platter, of Aurora, IN - Took command May 17, 1863 - resigned September 9, 1863 due to disability
- Colonel (Acting) John T. Deweese, of Evansville, IN - Took command September 10, 1863 - resigned March 11, 1864 as a Lieutenant Colonel
- Colonel (Acting) Horace P. Lamson, of Centreville, IN - Took command March 12, 1864 - mustered out June 29, 1865 with the regiment as a Lieutenant Colonel

== Notable people ==
- Isaac Pusey Gray: The future 18th and 20th Governor of Indiana served as the Colonel of the regiment from September 4, 1862, until his resignation on February 11, 1863.
- John T. Deweese: Originally mustered in as the Captain of Company F. Deweese was later promoted to the rank of Lieutenant Colonel and briefly served as the regiment's Colonel before resigning on March 11, 1864.

== Armament/Equipment/Uniform ==
=== Armament ===
The 4h Indiana was an 1862 three-year regiment, part of a levy that greatly increased the number of men under arms in the federal army. Troopers in the 1st Maine were initially armed only with a Model 1840 Cavalry Saber (and a handful of Model 1860 Light Cavalry Sabers) and a Colt .44 "Army" pistols (Remington New Model 1858 .44 "Army" pistols and |Colt Model 1848s were issued as well in small numbers). They were issued Smith Carbines (Note: A .50 caliber breech-loading black powder percussion rifle patented by Dr. Gilbert Smith, from New Yorj, on June 23, 1857 and successfully completed the military trials of the late 1850s. It was used by various cavalry units during the American Civil War. The Smith Carbine was unique in that it broke apart in the middle for loading and it used rubber and paper/brass foil cartridges which sealed the gases in the breech. The downside was that these rubber cartridges were sometimes difficult to remove from a hot breech.) as they became available. (Note: Many individuals in the regiment privately purchased a second or third revolver in the Army (.44) caliber. If they could not obtain a Colt, they frequently bought a Remingtons, Starrs, or Smith & Wessons.) Throughout the winter and spring of 1863, the 4th Indiana and the rest of the AoC's Cavalry Corps were re-arming with carbines such that by the end of the 2nd Quarter in 1863, the 4th Indiana was fully armed with Smith carbines (while retaining sabers and their pistols). As 1863 passed into 1864, like the other cavalry units in the AoC, these nSmiths were gradually turned in and the men iossued repeating Spencer carbines.

==== Sabers ====
Issued weapons

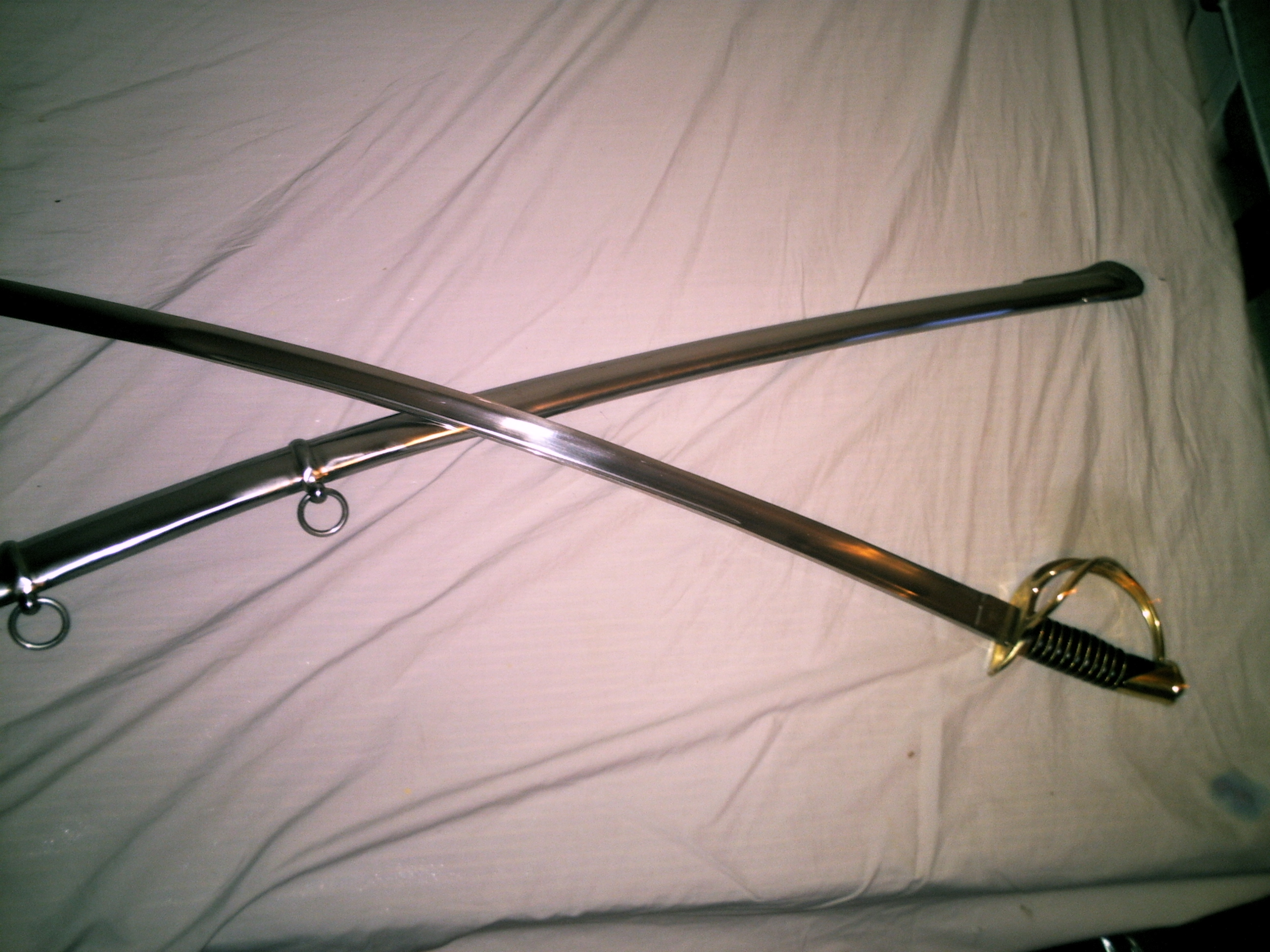
"Old Wristbreaker," Model 1840 Cavalry Saber

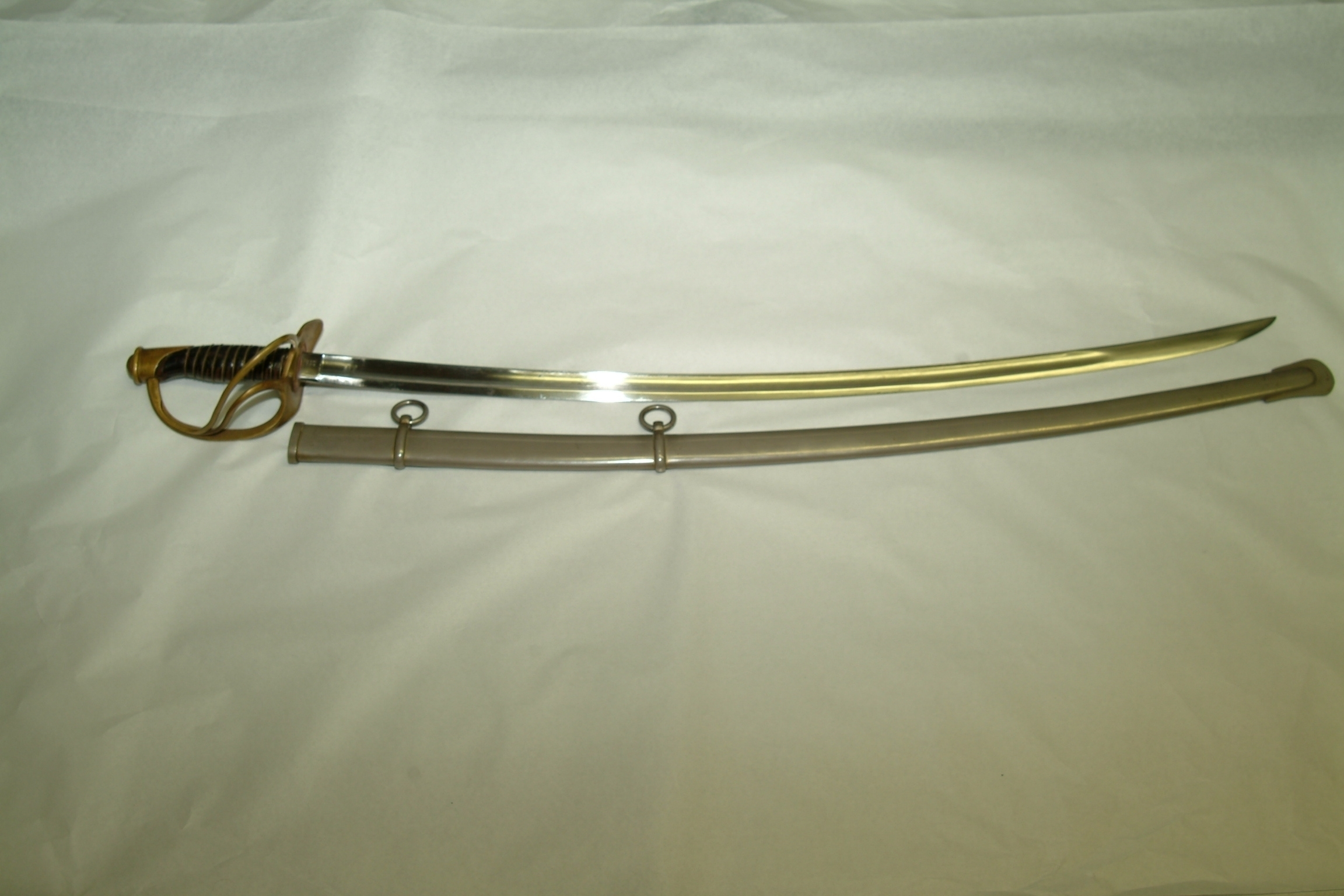
Model 1860 Light Cavalry Saber

==== Pistols ====
Issued weapons

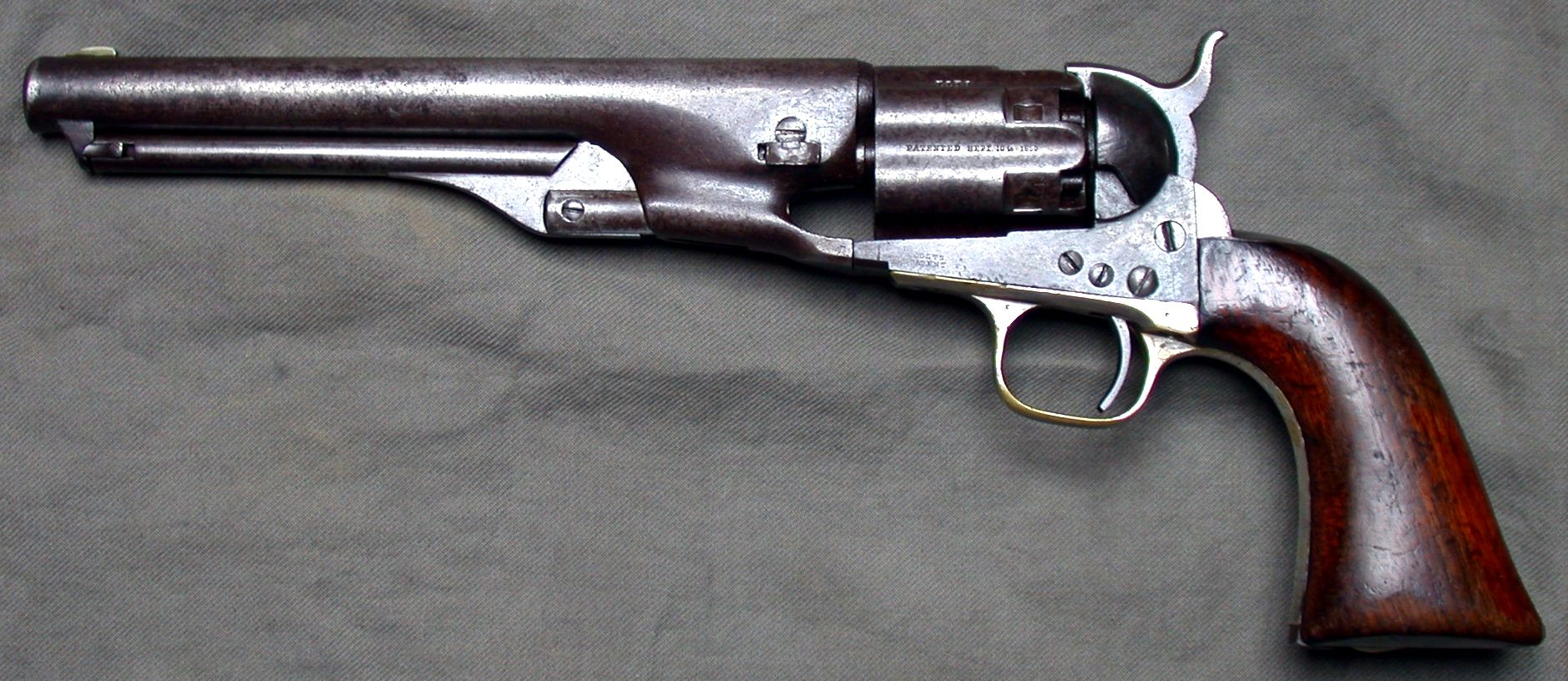
Colt Army 1860

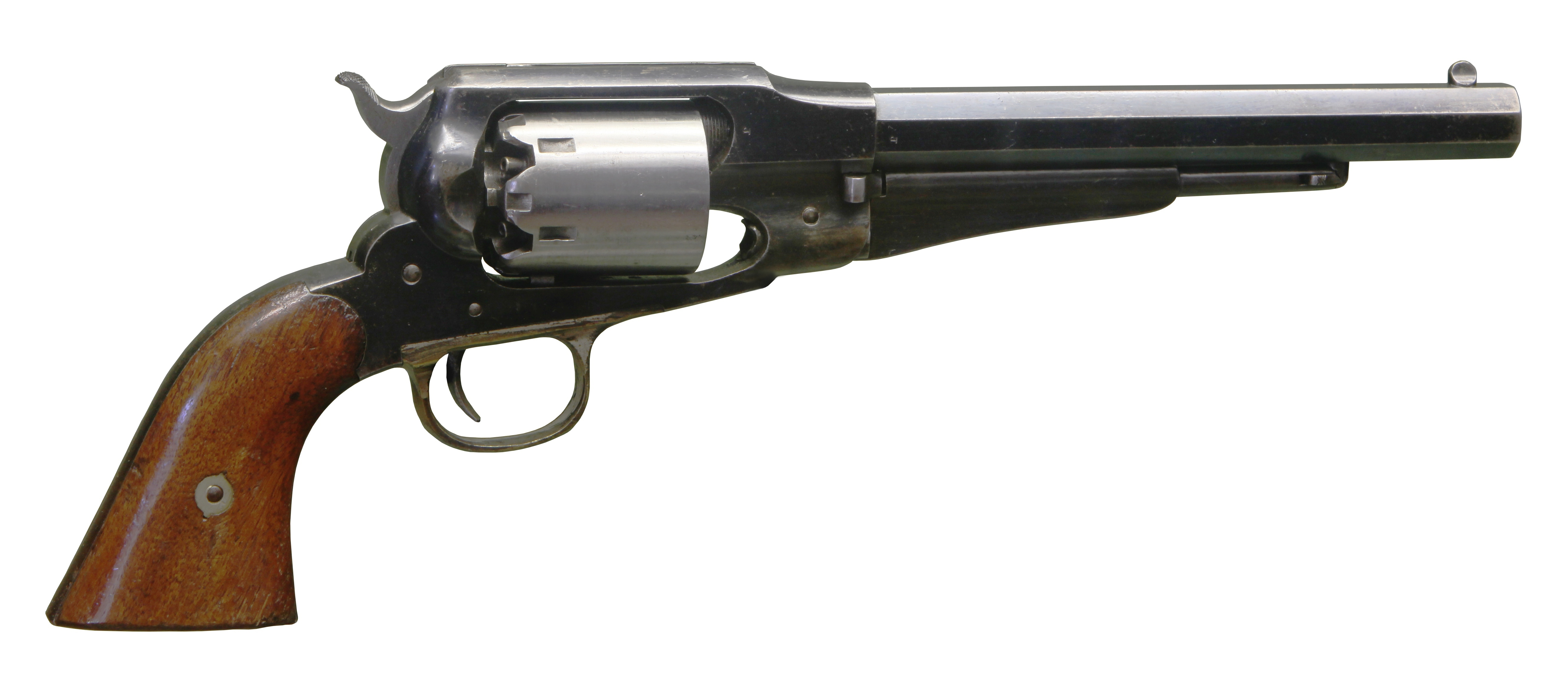
Remington New Model 1858 .44 "Army" pistol

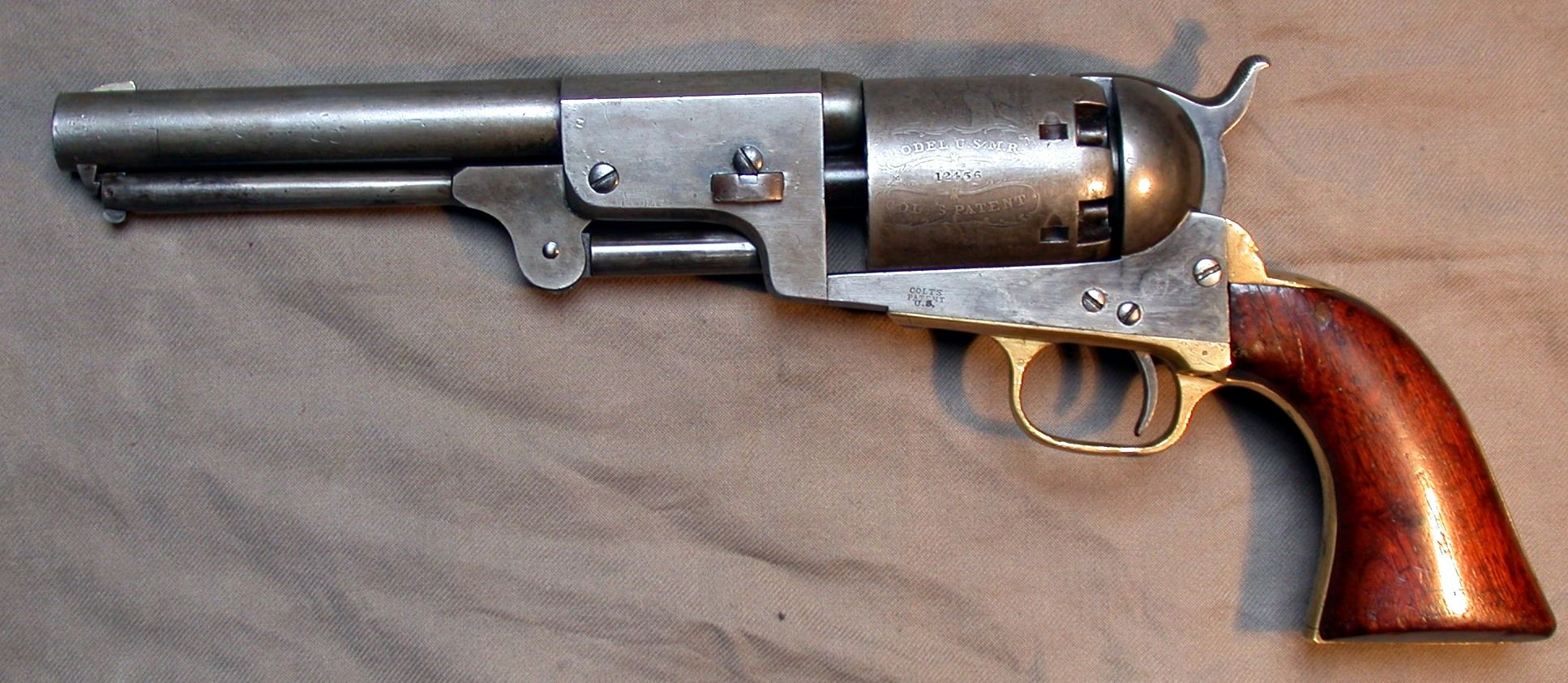
Colt Model 1848

==== Carbines ====
Issued weapons

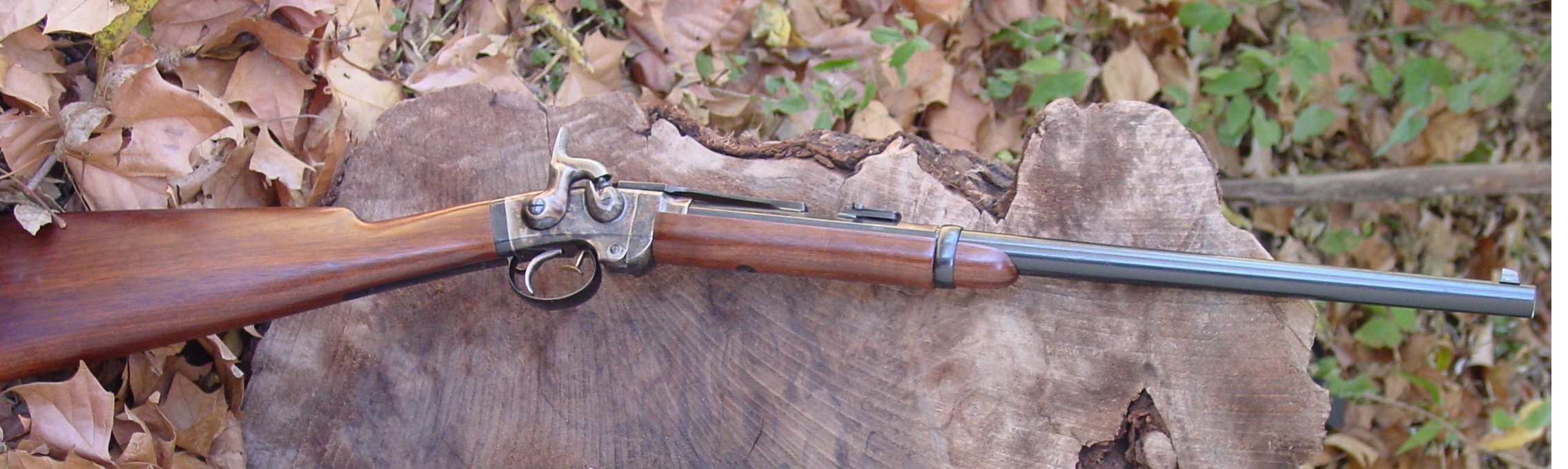
Smith carbine

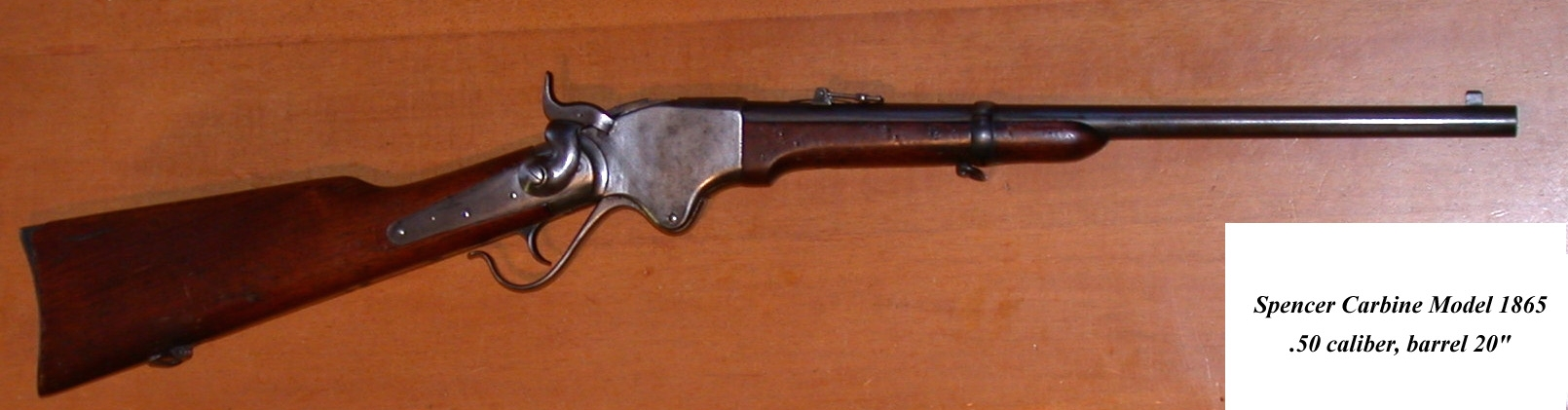
Spencer seven-shot carbine, issued weapon

=== Uniforms ===
The 4th Indiana received standard Federal cavalry jackets trimmed in yellow and reinforced mounted trousers. If there were not enough shell jackets, plain standard army sack coats were issued. Like most of the western U.S. volunteers, an undecorated 1858 Hardee hat or black civilian slouch hat was the normal headgear.
