= List of Confederate arms manufacturers =

This is a list of Confederate arms manufacturers. The Confederate States of America was a government set up from 1861 to 1865 by thirteen Southern states that had declared their secession from the United States. The Confederate States Army was the army of the Confederate States of America while the Confederacy existed during the American Civil War. Companies appearing in this list were manufacturers of arms within the Confederate States.

== Arms manufacturers ==
Company	Location	Founded	Products	Output & Production Numbers
Alexander, John & Co	Charleston, South Carolina	Lightfoot Arms, Atlanta Georgia		
Athens Steam Company	Athens, Georgia			experimental Double-barreled cannon
Atlanta Machine Works	Atlanta, Georgia	1848	Ordnance, rifled cannons	
Augusta Machine Works	Augusta, Georgia		Produced a variant of the Colt 1851 Navy Revolvers	
Leech & Rigdon	Augusta, Georgia		Produced a variant of the Colt 1851 Navy revolver	Or "Leech & Rigdon" <-- this differs how? -->
Bellona Arsenal	Midlothian, Virginia	1810	Artillery	
Bilharz, Hall	see Hodgkins			
Boyle & Gamble	Virginia		Bayonets, knives and swords	
Carruth Armory	Greenville, South Carolina	1819	.69 caliber flintlock smoothbore Harpers Ferry-style muskets.	over 3032 made in 1819, Many converted to percussion cap for Civil War
C. Chapman	Nashville, Tennessee		.54 caliber percussion muzzle-loading carbines	Less than 100
Cameron & Company	Charleston, South Carolina		Rifles	Also "Cameron, Taylor, & Johnson"
Churchill & Sons	Columbiana, Alabama		Artillery	
Columbus	Columbus, Georgia		.58 caliber percussion muzzle-loading carbines	183
College Hill Arsenal	Nashville, Tennessee		Swords and cavalry sabres	
Confederate States Armory	Kenansville, North Carolina	1863	Various edged weapons, lances and equipment	3,700 lance spears, 6,500 bayonets, 11,700 cavalry sabers, 2,700 officers sabers, 600 naval cutlasses, 800 artillery cutlasses
Congaree Foundry	Columbia, South Carolina			
Cook & Brother	New Orleans, Louisiana (before 1863), Athens, Georgia (1863–1866)		Various rifles, bayonets	3,800-4,000 rifles, of them 1,000 .58 caliber percussion muzzle-loading carbines
Davis & Bozeman	Elmore, Alabama		.58 caliber percussion muzzle-loading carbines	90
Dickson, Nelson & Co.	Adairsville, Georgia, Macon, Georgia, Dawson, Georgia		Rifles and carbines	3,600 total for all rifles and carbines (.58 caliber percussion muzzle-loading carbines)
J. M. Eason Bros.	Charleston, South Carolina			
Fayetteville Arsenal	Fayetteville, North Carolina		Rifles	
Georgia State Armory	Milledgeville, Georgia	1863	Rifles, cartridges, artillery equipment	
Wm. Glaze & Co.	Columbia, South Carolina		Rifles	Sometimes stamped his work with this name and sometimes "Palmetto Armory."
Griswold & Gunnison	Griswoldville, Georgia	1862	Produced a variant of the Colt 1851 Navy Revolver	3,700 Griswold & Gunnison revolvers
Hodgkins	Macon, Georgia, Pittsylvania, Virginia		.58 caliber percussion muzzle-loading carbines	400 to 700
Hyde & Goodrich	New Orleans, Louisiana		Rifles	
H. C. Lamb	Jamestown, North Carolina		.50 and .58 caliber percussion breech-loading carbines	532
Maynard	see Perry by Keen, Walker. Not to be confused with northern Maynard of Chicopee Falls, MA			
W. S. McElwaine	Holly Springs, Mississippi		Rifles	
Mendenhall, James & Gardner	Greensboro, North Carolina		Rifles	Contract with N. C. government for 10,000 rifles. Marks, "M. J. & G."
Montgomery Arsenal	Montgomery, Alabama	1861	Rifles (1864)	
Morse	Augusta, Georgia, Columbia, South Carolina		Carbines	
George W. Morse	Greenville, South Carolina		.50 caliber breech-loading carbines	1,000
Murdoch Morrison Gun Factory	Laurel Hill, North Carolina		Rifles	
J. P. Murray	Columbus, Georgia		.58 caliber percussion muzzle-loading carbines	Est. 1,000
Noble Bros. & Co	Rome, Georgia	1855	Various artillery pieces, artillery equipment	
N.C Institute for the Deaf, Dumb, and Blind	Raleigh, North Carolina	1845	.69 caliber Nessler ball variant for Model 1816 Musket and other obsolete flintlock firearm	Raleigh Arsenal produce Est. 1.5 million ammunition
Palmetto Iron Works	Columbia, South Carolina	1850	Model 1842 musket with bayonets, M1841 Mississippi Rifle, variant of the Colt Dragoon revolver, variant of the M1842 dragoon pistol, M1840 Cavalry saber, M1840 light artillery sabers, 10-inch shells, various small arms and ordnance	
J. C. Peck	Atlanta, Georgia		Specialty, rampart rifles	
Perry by Keen, Walker	Danville, Virginia		.54 caliber percussion breech-loading carbines	280
T. W. Radcliffe	Columbia, South Carolina		Rifles	Both maker and importer
Richmond Armory (VA Manufactory of Arms)	Richmond, Virginia	1861 (1798)	Variants of the Richmond rifle	31,000 rifles 5,400 carbines 1,350 short rifles
Thomas Riggins	Knoxville, Tennessee		Rifles	
S. C. Robinson Arms Manufactory (Samuel C. Robinson)	Richmond, Virginia		Produced a variant of the M1859 Sharps carbine	ca. 3,000 .52 caliber Sharps carbines. Marks, "Robinson Arms Co."
Selma Naval Foundry & Ironworks (Selma Arsenal & Gun Works)	Selma, Alabama	1861	Iron plating, Brooke rifled cannon, ironclad ships	over 70 Brooke rifles
Shakanoosa Arms Mfg. Co.			Rifles	
Shelby Iron Company	Shelby, Alabama	1842	Iron plating	
SC State Military Works	Greenville, South Carolina	1861		Also "State Rifle Works"
Spiller & Burr	Macon, Georgia		Rifles, variants of the Whitney model 1857 revolvers	
Samuel Sutherland	Richmond, Virginia		Rifles	
Tallassee	Tallassee, Alabama		.58 caliber percussion muzzle-loading carbines	500
Tarpley, Garrett & Co (Confederate Arms Factory)	Greensboro, North Carolina		Tarpley carbine	ca. 400 Tarpley carbines
George Todd	Austin, Texas		Rifles	
Tredegar Iron Works	Richmond, Virginia	1841	Various artillery pieces including the Brooke rifle, iron plating	ca. 1,100 artillery pieces
Tyler Arsenal	Tyler, Texas		Rifles	Marks, "Texas Rifle. Tyler, C. S."
Union Mfg. Co.	Richmond, Virginia		Rifles	G. P. Sloat, formerly of Philadelphia, Supt.
Virginia Manufactory	Richmond, Virginia		Rifles	
See: 1. Firearms in American History by Charles Winthrop Sawyer, Vol. 3 (Our Rifles), 1920, pp. 219–220.; 2. Civil War Guns and Weapons at thomaslegion.net 3. Civil War Artillery: Confederate Manufacturers

== See also ==
- List of Confederate arsenals and armories
- List of weapons in the American Civil War
- Rifles in the American Civil War
- Field artillery in the American Civil War
- Siege artillery in the American Civil War
