= General Sturgis =

General Sturgis may refer to:

- Samuel D. Sturgis (1822–1889), U.S. Army brevet major general
- Samuel D. Sturgis Jr. (1861–1933) (1861–1933), U.S. Army major general
- Samuel D. Sturgis III (1897–1964), U.S. Army lieutenant general

== See also ==
- Robert Sturges (1891–1970), Royal Marines lieutenant general
