= Model 1840 light artillery saber =

- Type: Saber
- Place of origin: United States of America

Service history
- Used by: United States Army

Production history
- Manufacturer: Ames Manufacturing Company

Specifications
- Length: 42 in (110 cm)
- Blade length: 32.25 in (81.9 cm)
- Blade type: Curved, single-edged
- Hilt type: Brass
- Scabbard/sheath: Iron

The Model 1840 light artillery saber was a saber of about 42 inches in length with a curved, single-edged blade and iron scabbard.

== History ==
The U.S. Model 1840 light artillery saber has a brass hilt and knuckle-bow of about 6 inches in length, the grip wrapped in leather and bound with brass wire, and a blade of 32.25 inches in length. Unlike the Model 1840 Heavy Cavalry Saber the artillery model has no basket.

This model was one of the many weapons produced by the Ames Manufacturing Company. of Springfield (later Chicopee), Massachusetts. The design appears to be a copy of the French saber style of 1829. The mounted artillery units accompanied dragoons to provide them with more firepower. The primary weapon of the mounted artillery were their cannons. The saber was more a traditional accoutrement than a combat weapon. The fact that Ames manufactured far fewer 1840 light artillery sabers than the number of soldiers in the artillery branch attests to this.

== Distinguishing features ==
This saber has a flat, brass handle, black leather grip wrapped in brass wire, and steel scabbard. Its slightly shorter but more steeply curved blade and single brass knuckle-bow distinguish this saber from similar cavalry designs. French versions can be distinguished from American versions by the presence of French manufacturers' marks and the lack of U.S. markings.
