= Emerson C. Itschner =

United States Army general

Emerson Charles Itschner
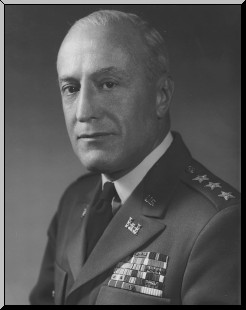
- Lieutenant General Emerson C. Itschner
- Born: 1 July 1903; Chicago, Illinois
- Died: 15 March 1995 (aged 91); Portland, Oregon
- Military career
- Allegiance: United States of America
- Branch: United States Army
- Service years: 1924–1961
- Rank: Lieutenant General
- Service number: 0-15516
- Unit: United States Army Corps of Engineers
- Commands: Chief of Engineers (1956–1961)
- Conflicts: World War II; Korean War
- Awards: Distinguished Service Medal; Legion of Merit (3); Bronze Star; Purple Heart; Air Medal

Emerson Charles Itschner (1 July 1903 – 15 March 1995) was an American military engineer.

== Biography ==
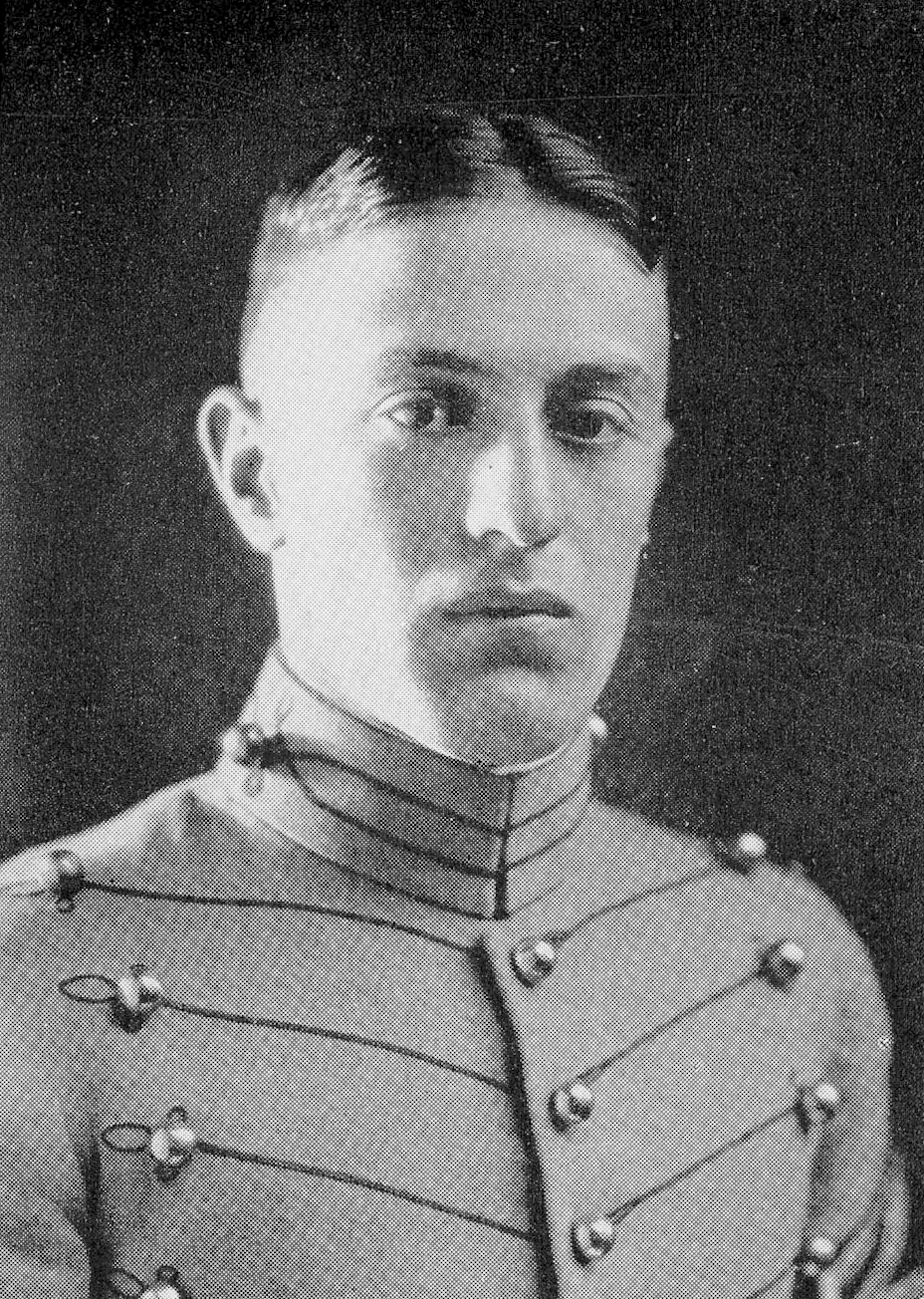
At West Point in 1924

Emerson C. Itschner was born in Chicago on 1 July 1903. He graduated from the United States Military Academy in 1924 and was commissioned in the Corps of Engineers. He obtained a degree in civil engineering from Cornell University in 1926.

Itschner served with the Alaska Road Commission in 1927–1929. He taught at the Missouri School of Mines and served as assistant to the Upper Mississippi Valley Division Engineer and the St. Louis District Engineer. He graduated from the Command and General Staff School on 1 February 1940 and then commanded a topographic survey company in 1940–1941.

In 1942–1943 Itschner headed the office in Corps headquarters that supervised Army airfield construction in the 48 states. In 1944–1945 he oversaw the reconstruction of ports and the development of supply routes to U.S. forces in Europe as Engineer, ADSEC (Advance Section, Communications Zone). Itschner headed the division in Corps headquarters responsible for military construction operations from 1946 to 1949.

After a year as Seattle District Engineer, he went to Korea as Engineer of I Corps and oversaw engineer troop operations in western Korea. He was North Pacific Division Engineer in 1952–1953. From 1953 until being appointed Chief of Engineers, he served as Assistant Chief of Engineers for Civil Works. General Itschner retired in 1961.

He died in Portland, Oregon, on 15 March 1995. He was interred at Willamette National Cemetery.

The Itschner Award is given each year by the Society of American Military Engineers in his honor.

== Decorations ==
He was awarded the Distinguished Service Medal, Legion of Merit with two Oak Leaf Clusters, the Bronze Star, the Purple Heart and an Air Medal.

- Army Distinguished Service Medal
- Legion of Merit
- Bronze Star
- Purple Heart
- Air Medal

== See also ==
Military offices
Preceded by Samuel D. Sturgis III	Chief of Engineers; 1956–1961	Succeeded by Walter K. Wilson Jr.
