= USS General S. D. Sturgis =

Transport ship of the United States Navy

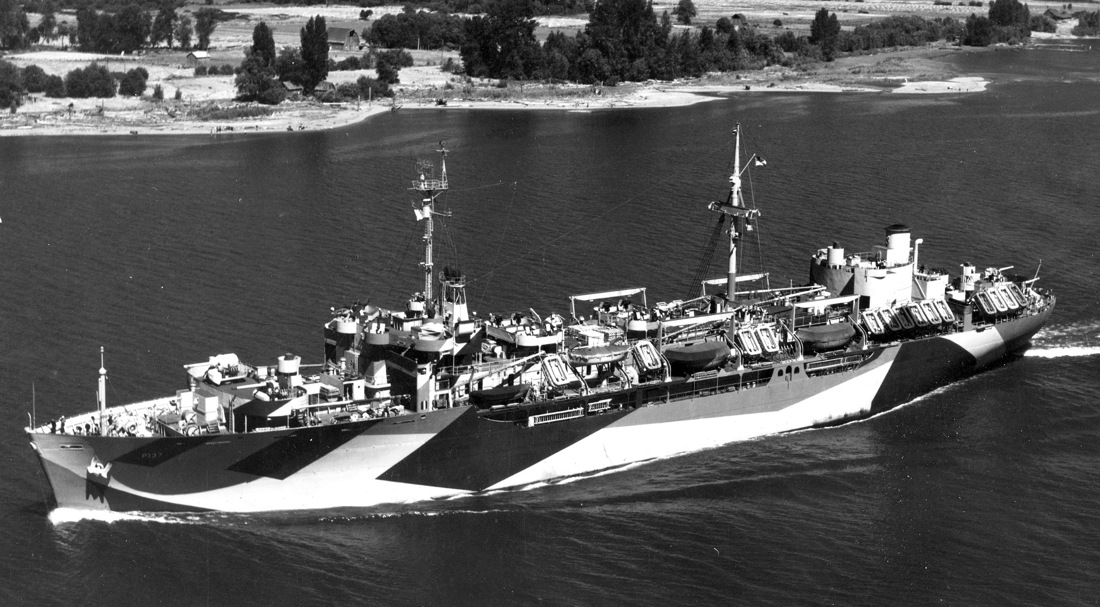
- General S. D. Sturgis on 16 July 1944

History

United States
- Name: General S. D. Sturgis
- Namesake: Samuel Davis Sturgis
- Builder: Kaiser Co., Inc.; Richmond, California
- Laid down: date unknown
- Launched: 12 November 1943
- Acquired: 31 March 1944
- Commissioned: 10 July 1944
- Decommissioned: 24 May 1946
- In service: after 24 May 1946 (Army); 1 March 1950 (MSTS)
- Out of service: 1 March 1950 (Army); 28 May 1955 (MSTS)
- Renamed: SS Green Port
- Reclassified: T-AP-137, 1 March 1950
- Identification: IMO number: 6810691; Radio call sign: NJCO
- Fate: Scrapped February 1980

General characteristics
- Class & type: General G. O. Squier-class transport ship
- Displacement: 9,950 tons (light), 17,250 tons (full)
- Length: 522 ft 10 in (159.36 m)
- Beam: 71 ft 6 in (21.79 m)
- Draft: 24 ft (7.32 m)
- Propulsion: single-screw steam turbine with 9,900 shp (7,400 kW)
- Speed: 17 knots (31 km/h)
- Capacity: 3,343 troops
- Complement: 356 (officers and enlisted)
- Armament: 4 × 5"/38 caliber guns; 8 × 1.1"/75 AA guns; 16 × 20 mm Oerlikon AA guns

USS General S. D. Sturgis (AP-137) was a General G. O. Squier-class transport ship for the U.S. Navy in World War II. She was named in honor of U.S. Army general Samuel Davis Sturgis. She was transferred to the U.S. Army as USAT General S. D. Sturgis in 1946. On 1 March 1950 she was transferred to the Military Sea Transportation Service (MSTS) as USNS General S. D. Sturgis (T-AP-137). She was later sold for commercial operation under the name SS Green Port, before being scrapped in 1980.

== Operational history ==
General S. D. Sturgis was launched under Maritime Commission contract (MC #660) 12 November 1943 by Kaiser Co., Inc., Yard 3, Richmond, California; sponsored by Miss Rio Ivanhoe; acquired by the Navy 31 March 1944; placed in ferry commission 24 April 1944 for transfer to Portland, Oregon; decommissioned 25 May 1944; converted to a transport by Kaiser Co., Inc., Vancouver, Washington; and placed in full commission at Portland, Oreg., 10 July 1944.

After shakedown calls at San Francisco and Los Angeles, General S. D. Sturgis arrived Seattle 10 August 1944 to embark cargo, troops, and passengers before getting underway 8 days later. She debarked troops and supplies at Honolulu 24 August and returned to San Francisco 2 September with hospital patients. From 27 September to 6 November the ship made one round-trip voyage from San Francisco to Pearl Harbor and one from Seattle before returning to San Francisco. She sailed from that port 16 November with troops and supplies bound for the Southwest Pacific. Touching Eniwetok 4 December and arriving at Ulithi 5 days later, she assumed duty there as a station receiving ship. General S. D. Sturgis carried part of Admiral Halsey's Third Fleet staff via Eniwetok to Pearl Harbor, finally reaching Seattle 19 February 1945. From 6 April to 2 June she made a round-trip, troop-carrying voyage from San Francisco to Langemak Bay and Hollandia, New Guinea; and San Pedro, Leyte as the Pacific campaigns reached a climax.

She now headed for Europe, departing San Francisco 16 June for France. After embarking troops at Marseilles 9 July, she departed the next day to redeploy them in the Pacific. She arrived safely at Manila 20 August. After debarking her passengers, she made ready to sail to Tokyo. On 26 August—by this time painted in camouflage measure 32, design 13T—the Sturgis sailed out of Manila with officers and officials of the United States, Australia, Canada, Netherlands East Indies, China, and the Philippines. The ship reached Tokyo Bay on 31 August; and two days later, the men carried by the Sturgis would be among the few who would witness the Japanese surrender ceremonies aboard Missouri. The ship was the only of her kind to be present in Tokyo Bay on Victory over Japan Day (2 September 1945), when the Japanese Instrument of Surrender was signed.

The ship got underway 26 September for Seattle, arriving there 8 October. She then made three round-trip voyages from the West Coast to Japanese ports, supporting occupation troops before departing San Francisco on an around-the-world voyage calling at Manila, Singapore, Calcutta, and Port Said, and arriving New York 10 May 1946. She decommissioned 24 May 1946 and was delivered to WSA for peacetime operation as an Army transport.

Rebuilt to 12,349 gross tons, USAT General S. D. Sturgis made 21 voyages between Germany and the U.S. with displaced persons. Among these refugees was Mrs. Marion Matewosian, a 99-year-old Armenian woman, who arrived in New York on 1 October 1949. Matewosian was said, in contemporary news accounts, to be the oldest person to come to the U.S. under the displaced persons program.

In addition to its many trips to the U.S. with displaced persons, General S. D. Sturgis also delivered refugees to Australia, Argentina, Canada, Brazil and Venezuela as well. The ship departed Genoa on one such mission with 860 displaced persons from Europe and arrived in Sydney on 14 May 1948. This voyage was one of almost 150 "Fifth Fleet" voyages by some 40 ships bringing refugees of World War II to Australia. General S. D. Sturgis made a trip, with displaced persons, from Bremerhaven, Germany, at the end of December 1948, to Buenos Aires, Argentina, arriving there on 17 January 1949. She made two more such trips, arriving in Sydney with 843 refugees on 21 May 1949, and with 1,309 on 17 April 1950.

In the midst of these treks, General S. D. Sturgis was reacquired by the Navy 1 March 1950, and was assigned to MSTS. Crewed by civilians, she was re-designated T-AP-137, and continued the transportation of people fleeing the aftermath of the war.

On 8 July 1949, USNS General S. D. Sturgis arrived at Boston with 841 displaced persons from Europe (mostly Poland and Lithuania). On 24 March 1951, General S. D. Sturgis developed a leak on a trip to New York with 884 displaced persons aboard. The ship arrived at New York under her own power two days later. The ship was slated to carry 190 of its passengers on to New Orleans, but because of the inspection it was to undergo, transferred them to USNS General R. M. Blatchford to continue their journey.

Among the voyages of the General S. D. Sturgis transporting displaced persons from Bremerhaven, Germany was an arrival in New York on 7 August 1951; on 11 September 1951 it docked to Pier 21 in Halifax, Canada; and on 11 October 1951, it reached New Orleans, Louisiana, U.S.A. with around 1,300 displaced persons.

As war broke out in Korea, General S. D. Sturgis took up the vital job of carrying U.N. troops to and from the Korean fighting. For the Korean War period, she sailed from New York to Bremerhaven and Mediterranean ports, embarking allied troops, and transported them to Pusan.

Following the Armistice, the transport rotated Greek, Turkish, Ethiopian, and Philippine troops in Korea, helping to maintain the high state of readiness among U.N. forces in that volatile land. During 1955, the ship made three voyages from New York to Bremerhaven, supporting American troops in Europe. She was placed in reduced operational status at New York 28 May 1955. General S. D. Sturgis was later returned to the Maritime Administration and was placed in the National Defense Reserve Fleet, Beaumont, Texas, 22 August 1958, where she remained until 1967.

She was sold at that time to Central Gulf Steamship Corp. of New Orleans, who rebuilt her as a cargo ship. Renamed SS Green Port, USCG ON 510015, IMO 6810691, she entered commercial service in June 1968. Green Port was laid up in San Francisco in 1979 and was scrapped at Kaohsiung, Taiwan in February 1980.

General S. D. Sturgis received three battle stars for Korean War service.

== Sources ==
- Williams, Greg H. (2013). World War II U.S. Navy Vessels in Private Hands. McFarland Books. ISBN 978-0-7864-6645-0.
