= Samuel D. Sturgis III =

United States Army general (1897–1964)

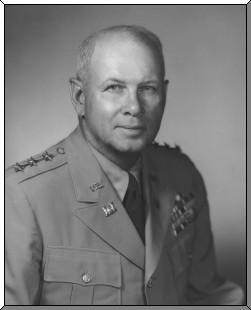
- Sturgis c. 1953
- Born: Samuel Davis Sturgis III; 16 July 1897; St. Paul, Minnesota, United States
- Died: 5 July 1964 (aged 66); Washington, D.C., United States
- Burial place: Arlington National Cemetery, Virginia, United States
- Relatives: Samuel D. Sturgis (grandfather); Samuel D. Sturgis Jr. (father)
- Military career
- Allegiance: United States
- Branch: United States Army
- Service years: 1918–1956
- Rank: Lieutenant General
- Service number: 0-9325
- Unit: United States Army Corps of Engineers
- Commands: 6th Armored Division; Corps of Engineers
- Conflicts: World War I World War II
- Awards: Distinguished Service Medal (2); Silver Star; Legion of Merit; Bronze Star Medal

Samuel Davis Sturgis III (16 July 1897 – 5 July 1964), also known as Samuel D. Sturgis Jr., was a senior officer of the United States Army who served as Chief of Engineers from 1953 to 1956, during the Cold War.

== Early life ==
Samuel Davis Sturgis III was born in St. Paul, Minnesota and came from a military family. Both his father, Samuel D. Sturgis Jr., and grandfather, also named Samuel D. Sturgis, were West Point graduates and major generals.

== Career ==
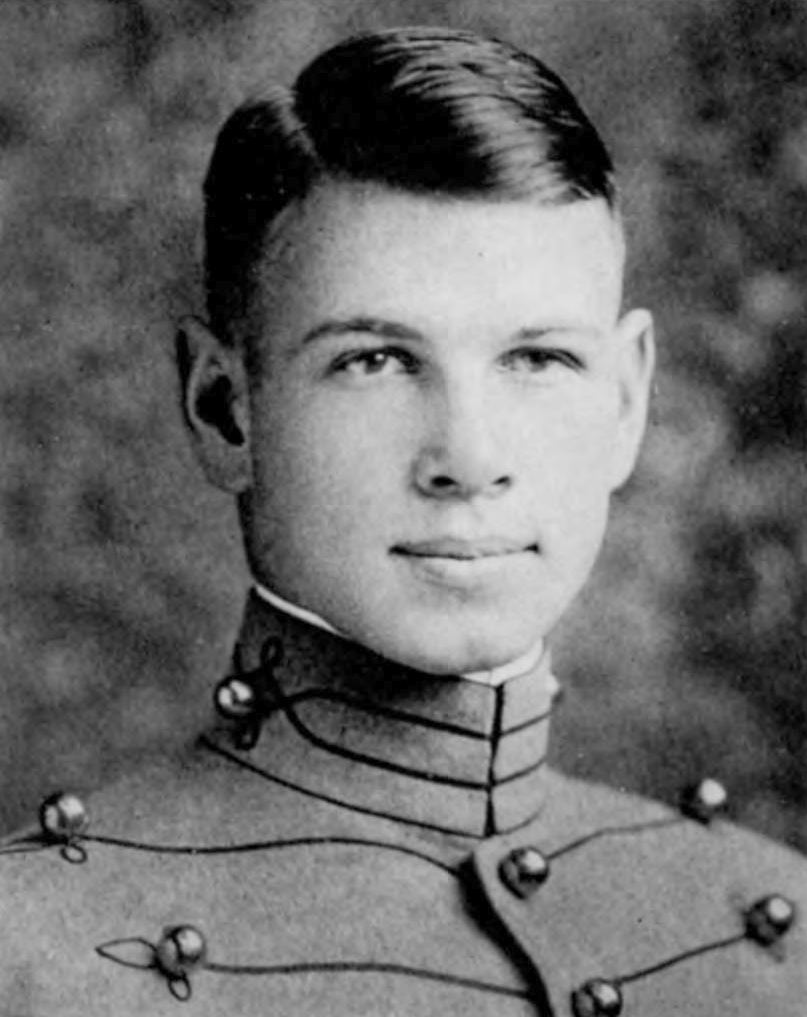
At West Point in 1918

Sturgis graduated from the United States Military Academy in June 1918. After initial engineer training in Virginia, he was sent to join the 9th Engineers (Mounted) on border duty at El Paso, Texas. Sturgis served as a company commander from August to December 1918, and then as regimental adjutant until February 1919. He then returned to Virginia to attend the Army Engineer School at Camp Humphreys. From July to August 1919, Sturgis was in Europe on an observation tour of the battlefields in France and Belgium. He graduated from the Engineer School in June 1920 and then completed the Military Engineering Basic Course in January 1921.

As a junior engineer officer, he taught mathematics at the academy for four years. In 1926, he was ordered to the Philippines, where he served as Adjutant of the 14th Engineers. His strategical studies of the islands over a three-year period developed knowledge he used later when he returned to the Philippines in 1944 as Chief Engineer of General Walter Krueger's Sixth U.S. Army. Sturgis commanded a mounted engineer company at Fort Riley, Kansas, in 1929–1933 and encouraged the adoption of heavy mechanical equipment. He graduated from the Command and General Staff School in June 1935. After assignments in Eastport, Maine and Huntington, West Virginia, Sturgis graduated from the Army War College in June 1940. He was then district engineer in 1940–1942 for Vicksburg, Mississippi, where he worked on flood control and a large military construction program. He served as chief engineer of the Sixth Army in 1943–1946.

During World War II, Sturgis' engineer troops built roads, airfields, ports, and bases from New Guinea to the Philippines. After the war, Sturgis was senior engineer for the army air forces in 1946-1948 and was Missouri River Division Engineer in 1949–51. In 1951, he became the Commanding General of the 6th Armored Division and Fort Leonard Wood, Missouri. In 1952, he was appointed Commanding General of the Communications Zone supporting the United States Army in Europe.

He became Chief of Engineers on 17 March 1953. Because of deteriorating health, Sturgis retired from active duty on 30 September 1956 after over thirty-eight years of service.

== Death ==
He died 5 July 1964, at Walter Reed General Hospital in Washington, D.C. and was buried at Arlington National Cemetery, in Arlington, Virginia, joined by his wife Frances Jewett in 1975.

== Personal life ==
In January 1922, Sturgis married Frances Jewett Murray (1897–1975), the daughter of Brigadier General Peter Murray (1867–1940) and Harriet Tingley Jewett (1871–1932).

== Awards ==
His military decorations include the Distinguished Service Medal with Oak Leaf Cluster, the Silver Star, the Legion of Merit and the Bronze Star Medal.

- Army Distinguished Service Medal with oak leaf cluster
- Silver Star
- Legion of Merit
- Bronze Star Medal
- World War I Victory Medal
- American Defense Service Medal
- American Campaign Medal
- Asiatic-Pacific Campaign Medal
- World War II Victory Medal
- Army of Occupation Medal
- National Defense Service Medal
- Philippine Liberation Medal

== See also ==
- MH-1A, floating nuclear power station Sturgis

Military offices
Preceded by Lieutenant General Lewis A. Pick	Chief of Engineers; 1953—1956	Succeeded by Lieutenant General Emerson C. Itschner
