= Battle of Mossy Creek =

Battle of the American Civil War

Coordinates: 36.1444°N 83.4423°W

- Part of the American Civil War
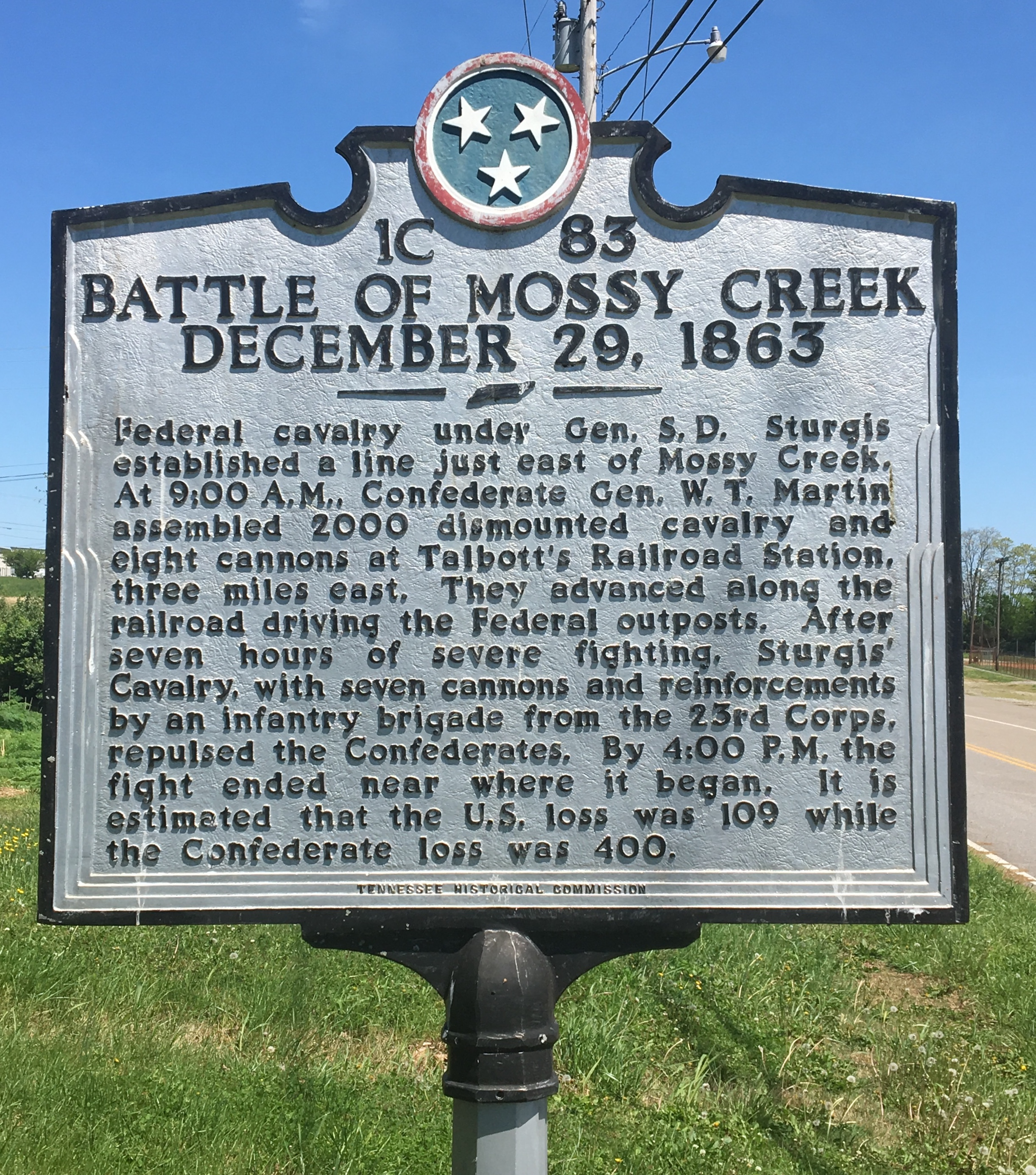
Date	December 29, 1863
Location	Jefferson County, Tennessee
Result	Union victory

Belligerents
United States of America (Union)	Confederate States of America

Commanders and leaders
Samuel D. Sturgis	William T. Martin

Units involved
Army of the Ohio; XXIII Corps	Martin's Cavalry Brigade

Strength
	2,000

Casualties and losses
151	Unknown

The Battle of Mossy Creek was a minor battle of the American Civil War, occurring on December 29, 1863, in Jefferson County, Tennessee.

== Background ==
Union Brig. Gen. Samuel D. Sturgis, while encamped at Mossy Creek and forward towards Talbott's Station, received a report on the night of December 28, 1863, that a brigade of Confederate cavalry had gone into camp that afternoon near Dandridge south of Mossy Creek. Surmising that the enemy force was split, Sturgis decided to meet, defeat, and possibly capture the encamped enemy cavalry. To accomplish this, he ordered a portion of his troops out of Mossy Creek and Talbott's Station toward Dandridge. After these forces had departed, Maj. Gen. William T. Martin, commander of Lt. Gen. James Longstreet's Confederate cavalry, encamped at Panther Creek near Morristown, attacked the small Federal force at Talbott's Station at 9:00 a.m. on December 29.

== Battle ==
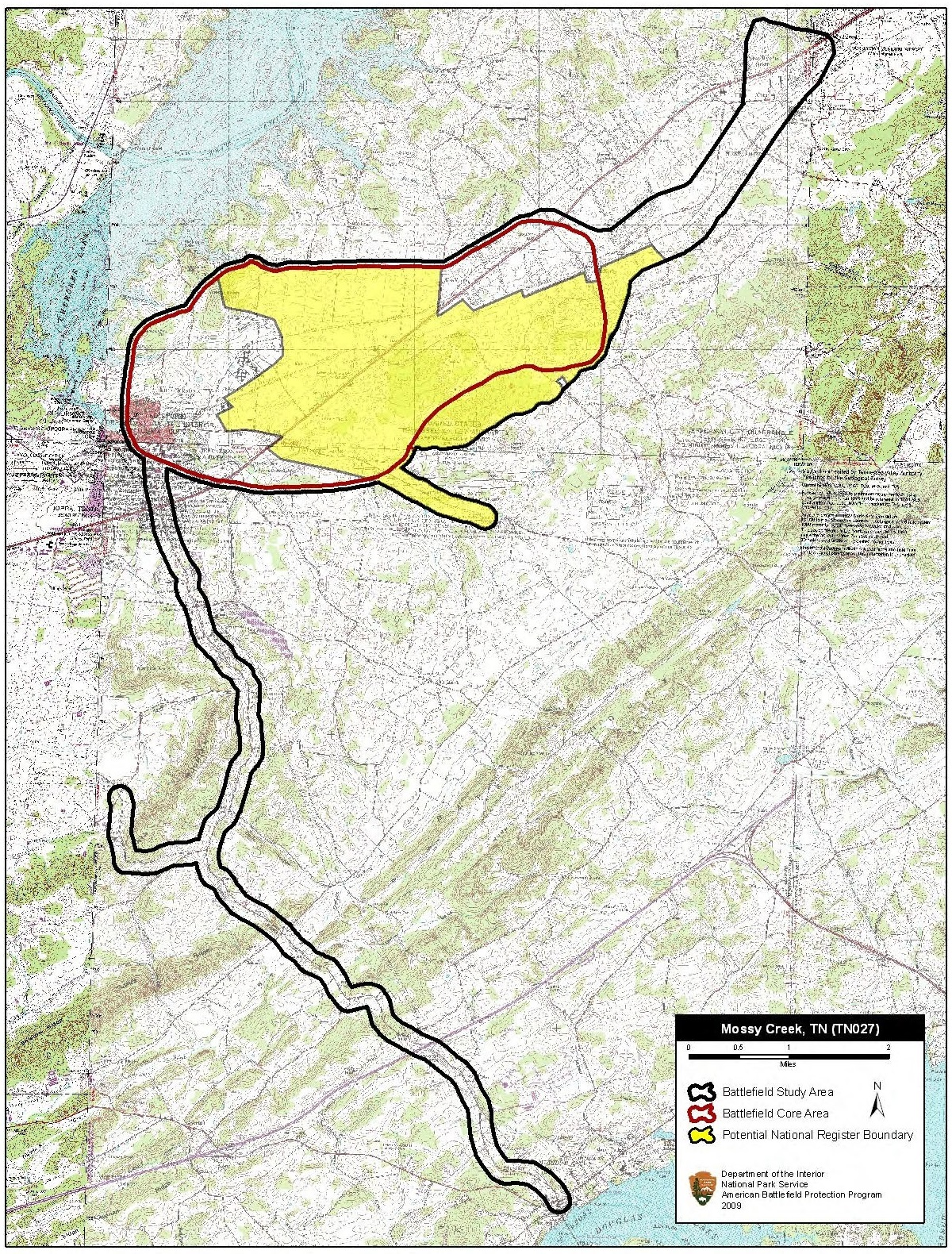
Map of Mossy Creek Battlefield core and study areas by the American Battlefield Protection Program.

The Federals slowly fell back to Mossy Creek and Sturgis sent messages to his subordinates on the way to Dandridge to return promptly if they found no enemy there. The Confederates advanced on Mossy Creek, driving the Federals in front of them. Finding no enemy forces in Dandridge, the Union troops hastily returned to Mossy Creek and joined the battle. Around 3:00 p.m. the Federals began driving the Confederates back out of Mossy Creek towards Talbott's Station and Panther Creek. By dark, the Confederates were back to their original location at Panther Creek. Union pursuit was not mounted that night, but as it was late in the season, Martin chose to retreat from the area back towards Morristown for the winter. After the victory at Mossy Creek, the Union held the line about Talbott's Station for some time. The battle lasted about seven hours, and approximately 500 Union and Confederate soldiers were killed or wounded.
