= Model 1860 Light Cavalry Saber =

U.S. Army cavalry sword

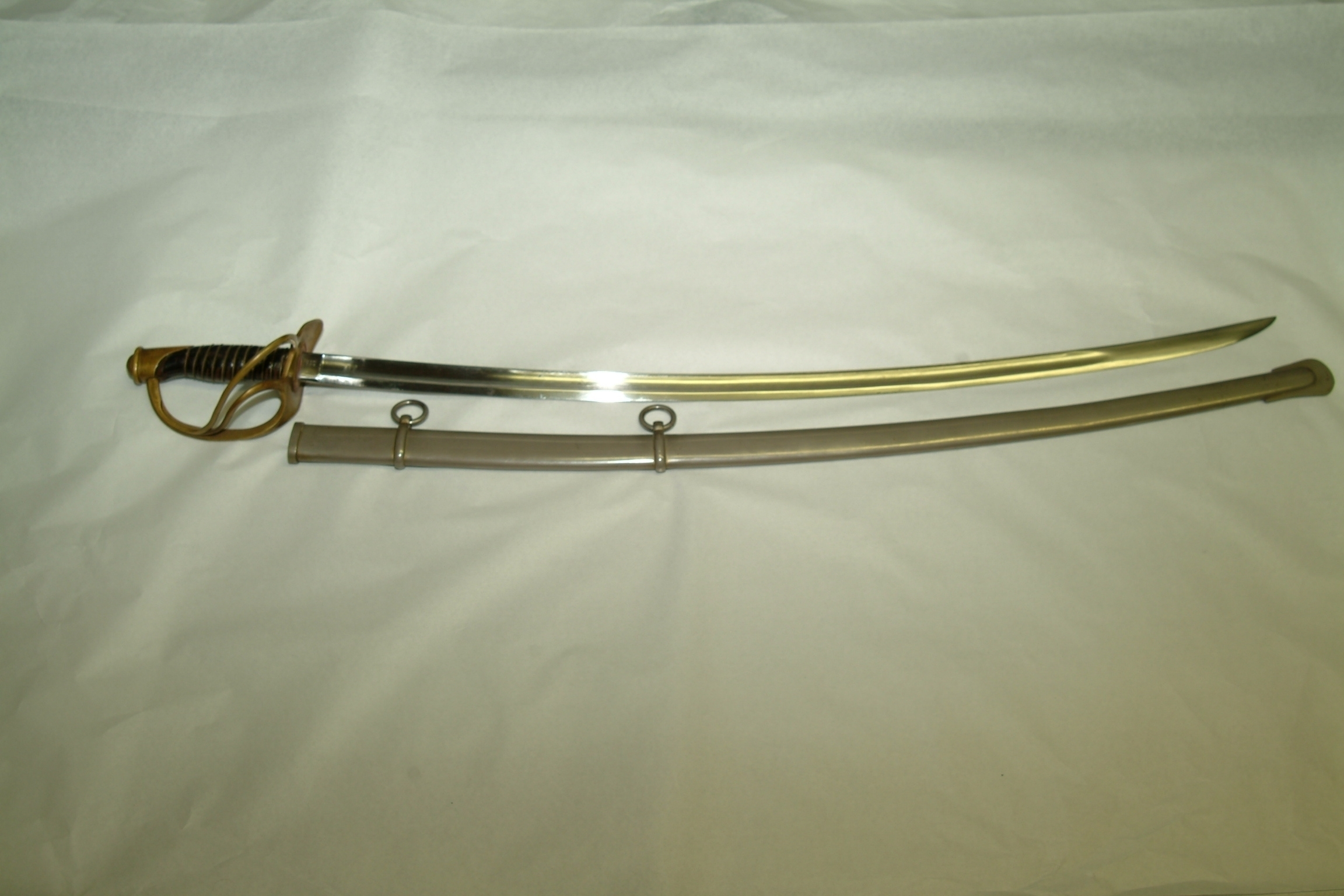
- Model 1860 Light Cavalry Saber
- Type: Sabre
- Place of origin: United States

Service history
- Wars: American Civil War; Indian wars Spanish-American War

The Model 1860 Light Cavalry Saber (also known as the M1862 as this was when the first 80,000 were issued) is a long sword made of steel and brass, used by US cavalry.

== History ==
Before the Civil War there was no light or heavy cavalry in the US army.

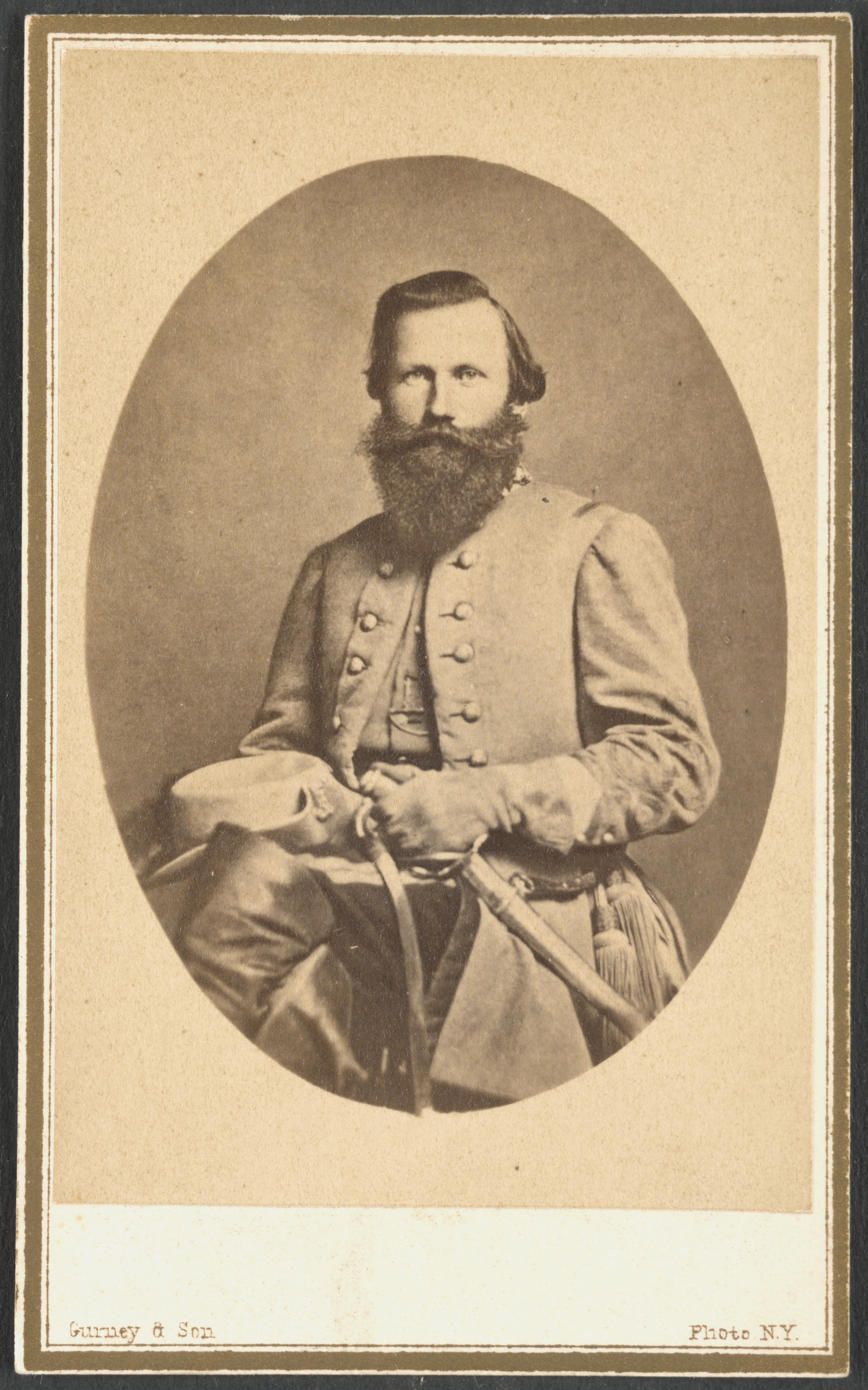
J.E.B. Stuart with his 1860 saber. It is shorter, lighter and less curved than the 1840 model

Instead there were "Dragoons" (founded 1830) and "Mounted Riflemen" (founded c.1840).

In 1861 these mounted regiments were renamed cavalry and given yellow piping.

== Design ==
The M1860 saber was 41 inches (104 cm) long with a 35 by 1 in (88.9 by 2.5 cm) blade and weighed 2 lb 4 oz (1.0 kg) alone or 3 lb 10 oz (1.6 kg) with iron scabbard.

The M1860 saber received its name to distinguish it from the larger and heavier Model 1840 Cavalry Saber that it replaced. Like its predecessor it had a brass guard, leather-wrapped grip and steel scabbard but unlike the M1840 it was smaller and easier to handle.

By the end of the Civil War over 300,000 1860 sabers had been produced: 200,000 by Ames, 32,000 by Roby and many more by firms such as Tiffany and Co, Glaze, Justice, and Emerson and Silver.

== Adoption ==
M1860s were carried not only by cavalry but also by many infantry and staff officers as the regulation Model 1850 Army Staff & Field Officers' Sword had to be privately purchased.

High-ranking officers, like their European counterparts, often had their swords ornately engraved with gilding and foliage. Famous users included George Armstrong Custer and J.E.B. Stuart.

Later in the Civil War large cavalry charges became less common and the cavalry took on the role of skirmishers. Many replaced their sabers with extra revolvers, or left it in the saddle while fighting on foot with their repeating Henry rifles and Spencer carbines.

The adoption of the Model 1860 started from the American Civil War until the end of the Indian wars; some were still in use during the Spanish–American War.

=== Legacy ===
This is the sword the cavalry use in Westerns, many being original antiques purchased by the movie industry in the 1920s when surplus Civil War equipment was cheap.

=== Current usage ===
This model is currently used in some U.S. Army Cavalry units in Color Guards, or when in period type uniforms. Most are given as PCS (Permanent Change of Station) or ETS (Expiration of Term of Service) gifts to a departing Cavalry Trooper.

Usually engraved on the scabbard with his name, rank and dates of service. Some are also worn, in full Dress Blues, (when earned on a "Spur Ride" or combat tour) with Stetson and Spurs.
