= Samuel D. Sturgis =

United States Army general (1822–1889)

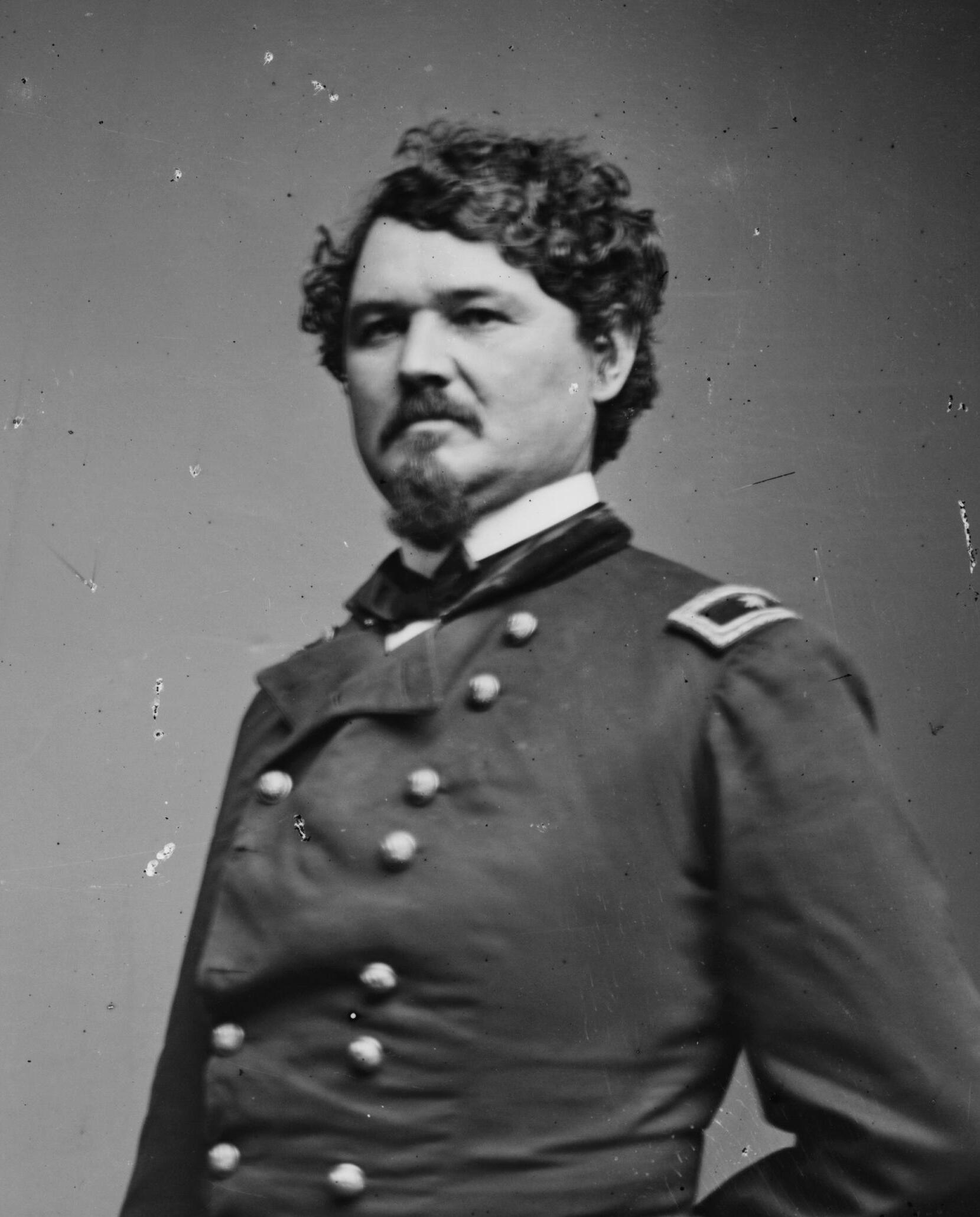
- Sturgis in uniform, c. 1862
- Born: Samuel Davis Sturgis; June 11, 1822; Shippensburg, Pennsylvania, U.S.
- Died: September 28, 1889 (aged 67); Saint Paul, Minnesota, U.S.
- Burial place: Arlington National Cemetery
- Spouse: Jerusha Wilcox (m. 1851)
- Relatives: Samuel D. Sturgis Jr. (son); Samuel D. Sturgis III (grandson)
- Military career
- Allegiance: United States
- Branch: United States Army
- Service years: 1846–1886
- Rank: Brevet Major-General
- Commands: 6th U.S. Cavalry; 7th U.S. Cavalry
- Conflicts: Mexican War (POW); Civil War: Battle of Wilson's Creek; Battle of South Mountain; Battle of Antietam; Battle of Fredericksburg; Battle of Mossy Creek; Battle of Dandridge; Battle of Fair Garden; Battle of Brice's Crossroads; Indian Wars: Nez Perces

Samuel Davis Sturgis (June 11, 1822 – September 28, 1889) was a senior officer of the United States Army. A veteran of the Mexican War, Civil War, and Indian Wars, he attained the rank of brevet major general.

== Early life and career ==
Samuel D. Sturgis was born in Shippensburg, Pennsylvania. His parents were Mary Brandenburg and James Sturgis. He entered the United States Military Academy (USMA) in 1842, at the age of twenty; and was graduated 32/59 in the famous class of 1846 as a brevet second lieutenant in the 2nd Dragoons. That class also included among its graduates John Gibbon, George B. McClellan, Jesse Reno, and George Stoneman, who would fight on the Union side and Ambrose Powell Hill, Thomas Jonathan "Stonewall" Jackson, and George Pickett, who would fight on the Confederate side. (Note: Sturgis' Class of 1846 classmates included George McClellan (2/59), Stonewall Jackson (17/59), George Stoneman (33/59), and George Pickett (59/59).)

During the Mexican War, he served with the 1st Dragoons and was captured and held for eight days as a prisoner of war while making a reconnaissance near Buena Vista, Mexico. He escaped and brought back information that helped win the battle.

After the war, he served in the West, was promoted to first lieutenant and captain, and took part in a number of Indian campaigns. During this time, Sturgis was sent to West Ely, Missouri, where he met Jerusha Wilcox. In 1851, they married and would have six children.

== Civil War ==
When the Civil War broke out, Sturgis continued to serve with the 1st Dragoons (which was shortly afterwards redesignated the 1st Cavalry Regiment). He was promoted to major in May 1861 and later transferred to the 4th Cavalry Regiment. In August 1861, at the Battle of Wilson's Creek, he succeeded to command of the Federal forces after the death of Brig. Gen. Nathaniel Lyon. In March 1862, he was appointed brigadier general of volunteers to rank from August 10, 1861, the day of the battle, as well as breveted lieutenant colonel, Regular Army.

After a tour of duty in the Washington, DC, defenses, he was ordered to the front to support General John Pope's Army of Virginia just prior to the Second Battle of Bull Run. While attempting to secure priority from General Herman Haupt for movement of his troops on the railroad, he was told that he must wait his turn as other troops and supplies were going forward to support Pope. His reaction was his now-famous remark, "I don't care for John Pope one pinch of owl dung."

Sturgis then commanded the 2nd Division in the IX Corps at the battles of South Mountain, Antietam, and Fredericksburg.

He went west with IX Corps in 1863. He was promoted to lieutenant colonel with the 6th U.S. Cavalry on October 27, 1863 and had a number of relatively unimportant commands in Tennessee and Mississippi. He commanded the Cavalry Corps of the Department of the Ohio, conducting operations in the vicinity of Dandridge, Tennessee during the Winter of 1863–1864. In June 1864, he was routed by Nathan Bedford Forrest at the Battle of Brice's Crossroads in Mississippi. As a result of the defeat, he faced charges of inefficiency and cowardice. However, he was exonerated at a special hearing.

== After the Civil War ==
Sturgis was breveted brigadier general (for South Mountain) and major general (for Fredericksburg), Regular Army, in March 1865 and mustered out of the volunteer service in August. He reverted to his regular rank of lieutenant colonel of the 6th U.S. Cavalry. On May 6, 1869, he became colonel and commander of the 7th U.S. Cavalry, and his lieutenant colonel was George Armstrong Custer.

Sturgis was on detached duty as the Superintendent of Mounted Recruiting Service and in command of the Cavalry Depot in St. Louis, Missouri, when parts of the 7th Cavalry were destroyed at the Battle of Little Big Horn (one of Sturgis's sons, Second Lieutenant James G. Sturgis, was also an officer with the 7th and was killed in that battle.) Samuel Sturgis then took personal command of the regiment and led the 7th Cavalry in the campaign against the Nez Percé in 1877. Sturgis and his soldiers headed off the Nez Percé and waited to attack them once they emerged from their passage through the wilderness of Yellowstone Park. The Nez Percé deceived Sturgis with a feint and eluded him, continuing their flight northward toward Canada. Sturgis soon caught up with them, but at the Battle of Canyon Creek, the Nez Percé, although outnumbered two to one, again escaped from his grasp.

From 1881 until 1886, Sturgis was governor of the Soldiers' Home in Washington, D.C. He retired in 1886 and died in Saint Paul, Minnesota in 1889. He is buried with his wife Jerusha (1827–1915) at Arlington National Cemetery, in Arlington, Virginia. His son Samuel D. Sturgis Jr. became a general in the United States Army, and was a division commander in the American Expeditionary Force during World War I. His grandson Samuel D. Sturgis III also became a general in the United States Army and served as Chief of Engineers from 1953 to 1956.

== Legacy ==
The city of Sturgis, South Dakota, is named for Samuel D. Sturgis. A sculpture of him mounted on horseback is located at the eastern entrance of the town on South Dakota Highway 34 and 79.

His military legacy continued with his sons and grandson. His sons, James Sturgis (USMA 1875) and Samuel D. Sturgis Jr. (USMA 1884), would both graduate from the United States Military Academy and serve in the Army. James was killed at the Battle of Little Bighorn. His son, Samuel Jr, and his grandson, Samuel D. Sturgis III, both became general officers in the U.S. Army.

== See also ==
- List of American Civil War generals (Union)
