= Samuel D. Sturgis Jr. =

United States Army general (1861–1933)

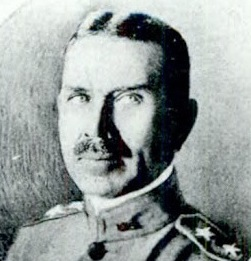
- Sturgis c. 1917 wearing the two stars of a major general
- Born: Samuel Davis Sturgis Jr. August 1, 1861; St. Louis, Missouri, US
- Died: March 7, 1933 (aged 71); Washington, D.C., US
- Burial place: Arlington National Cemetery
- Spouse: Bertha Bement (m. 1896)
- Children: 3 (including Lt. Gen. Samuel D. Sturgis III)
- Relatives: Brevet Maj. Gen. Samuel D. Sturgis (father)
- Military career
- Allegiance: United States
- Branch: United States Army
- Service years: 1884–1925
- Rank: Major General
- Service number: 0-47
- Commands: 12th Field Artillery Battery; 3d Field Artillery; 1st Field Artillery; 7th Field Artillery; Camp Funston; Camp Leon Springs; Camp Pike; 87th Division; 80th Division; Camp Gordon; Camp Sherman; Panama Canal Department; Third Corps Area
- Conflicts: War with Spain; Philippine Insurrection; World War I

Samuel D. Sturgis Jr. (August 1, 1861 – March 7, 1933) was a senior officer of the United States Army who commanded the 87th and 80th divisions during World War I. He attained the rank of major general, and retired after 41 years of service. He was the father of US Army LtGen Samuel D. Sturgis III.

== Early life and career ==
Samuel Davis Sturgis Jr. was born in St. Louis, Missouri on August 1, 1861, the son of Samuel D. Sturgis and Jerusha (Wilcox) Sturgis. He attended Washington University in St. Louis before becoming a student at the United States Military Academy. Sturgis graduated 13th of 37 in the class of 1884, and was commissioned as a second lieutenant of Field Artillery.

Sturgis was assigned to the 1st Field Artillery, with which he served until 1891. His initial assignments included postings to Alcatraz Island, the Presidio of San Francisco, and the harbor defenses of San Diego, San Pedro, and Santa Barbara, and Fort Mason, California.

After assignment to West Point from 1890 to 1891, Sturgis served until as aide-de-camp to Wesley Merritt during Merritt's command of the Department of Dakota and Department of the Missouri. He then served with his regiment at Fort Riley, and then transferred to the 6th Artillery, with which he served at Fort Monroe and Fort McHenry. In 1897 and 1898, Sturgis was assistant adjutant of the Department of the Pacific.

== War with Spain ==
During the War with Spain, Sturgis was assigned as assistant adjutant of the Eighth Corps. He took part in the Battle of Manila, and then served as adjutant of the Department of Dakota. He was subsequently assigned to Cuba, and served as disbursing officer of Cuban funds for the Department of Havana and assistant adjutant of the Department of Pinar del Rio.

== Philippine Insurrection ==
Sturgis served during the Philippine Insurrection as assistant adjutant of the Philippine Division. He also served as adjutant of an expedition commanded by Theodore Schwan.

== Interwar period ==
From 1901 to 1906, Sturgis was assigned to command the 12th Battery of Field Artillery, and served at Fort Douglas and Fort D. A. Russell. During 1906 he also served as adjutant of the 2nd Provisional Field Artillery, an experimental organization that conducted operations at Fort Sill. From 1907 to 1909, Sturgis served on the Army staff at the War Department. He was chief of staff of the Department of Dakota from 1909 to 1911.

In March 1911, Sturgis was promoted to lieutenant colonel and assigned as second in command of the 3d Field Artillery, based at Fort Sam Houston. He was assigned as the regimental commander in May, and served until August. Between November 1911 and December 1912, Sturgis was a student at the Field Artillery School of Fire, and then the Mounted Service School at Fort Riley. He was promoted to colonel in December 1912.

In May 1913, Sturgis was assigned to command the 1st Field Artillery at Schofield Barracks, and he remained until January 1916, when he was ordered to Fort Sam Houston to organize and command the 7th Field Artillery.

== World War I ==
In May 1917, just weeks after the American entry into World War I, Sturgis was promoted to brigadier general, and in July, he was assigned to command the training camp organized at Camp Leon Springs.

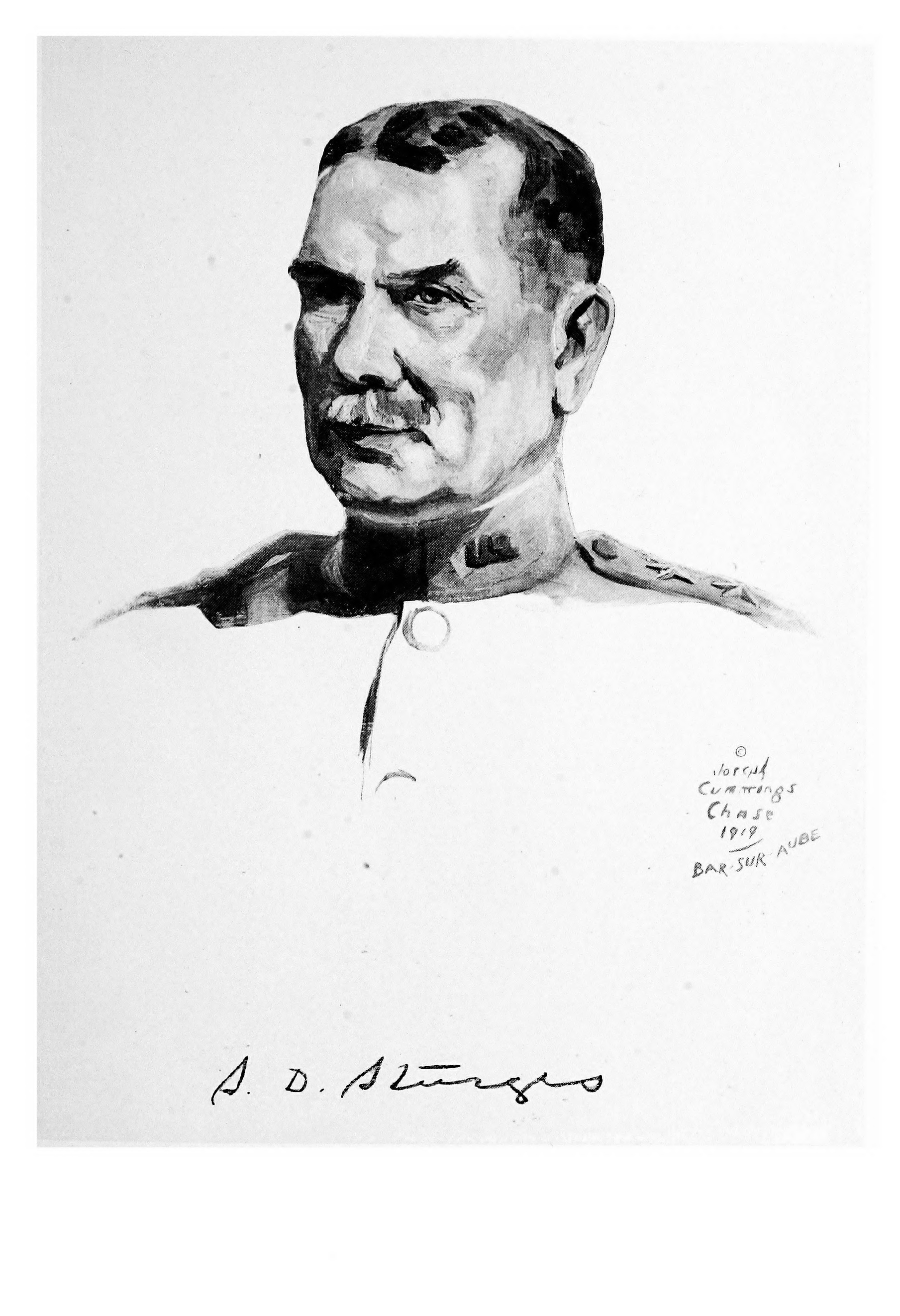
Portrait of Sturgis by war artist Joseph Cummings Chase (1919)

In August, Sturgis was promoted to temporary major general and assigned to command Camp Pike, Arkansas and the 87th Division.

After leading it though its organization and training, Sturgis led the division to the Western Front beginning in August 1918, when it was broken up and used to provide replacement troops for front line units of the American Expeditionary Forces (AEF). He remained in command of the division until the end of the war, caused by the Armistice with Germany, in November.

== After World War I ==
From November 1918 until April 1919, Sturgis commanded the 80th Division during its post-war occupation duty.

After the war, Sturgis commanded the demobilization centers at Camp Gordon, Camp Pike, and Camp Sherman between 1919 and 1921. In June 1920 he returned to his permanent rank of brigadier general. In October 1921, Sturgis was promoted to permanent major general. He commanded the Panama Canal Department until October 1924. Sturgis commanded the Third Corps Area headquartered at Fort Holabird from November 1924 until retiring in August 1925.

== Retirement and death ==
In retirement, Sturgis resided in Washington, D.C. He died there on March 7, 1933. He is buried at Arlington National Cemetery, in Arlington, Virginia, with his wife Bertha.

== Personal life ==
In 1896, Sturgis married Bertha Bement (1875–1955). They were the parents of Major General Samuel D. Sturgis III, Elizabeth T. Sturgis, and Robert Bement Sturgis.

== Legacy ==
The World War II-era transport ship USS General S. D. Sturgis was named in his honor.

Military offices
Preceded by Newly activated organization	Commanding General 87th Division; 1917−1918	Succeeded by William F. Martin
Preceded by Adelbert Cronkhite	Commanding General 80th Division; 1918–1919	Succeeded by Adelbert Cronkhite
