= List of Confederate arsenals and armories =

This is a list of Confederate arsenals and armories. The Confederate States of America was a government set up from 1861 to 1865 by eleven Southern slave states that had declared their secession from the United States. The Confederate States Army was the army of the Confederate States of America while the Confederacy existed during the American Civil War. Arsenals and armories in this list were active during the years of the confederacy and during the American Civil War.

Arsenals
Name	Image	Location	Started operations
Athens Armory		Athens, Georgia	1863
Beaufort Arsenal		Beaufort, South Carolina	
Camden Powder Magazine		South Carolina	
Charleston Arsenal		Charleston, South Carolina	
Columbia Arsenal		Columbia, South Carolina	
Mount Vernon Arsenal		Mt. Vernon, Alabama	
Richmond Armory		Richmond, Virginia	Reactivated 1861

== See also ==
- Fayetteville Arsenal
