= Model 1840 Cavalry Saber =

US Army saber

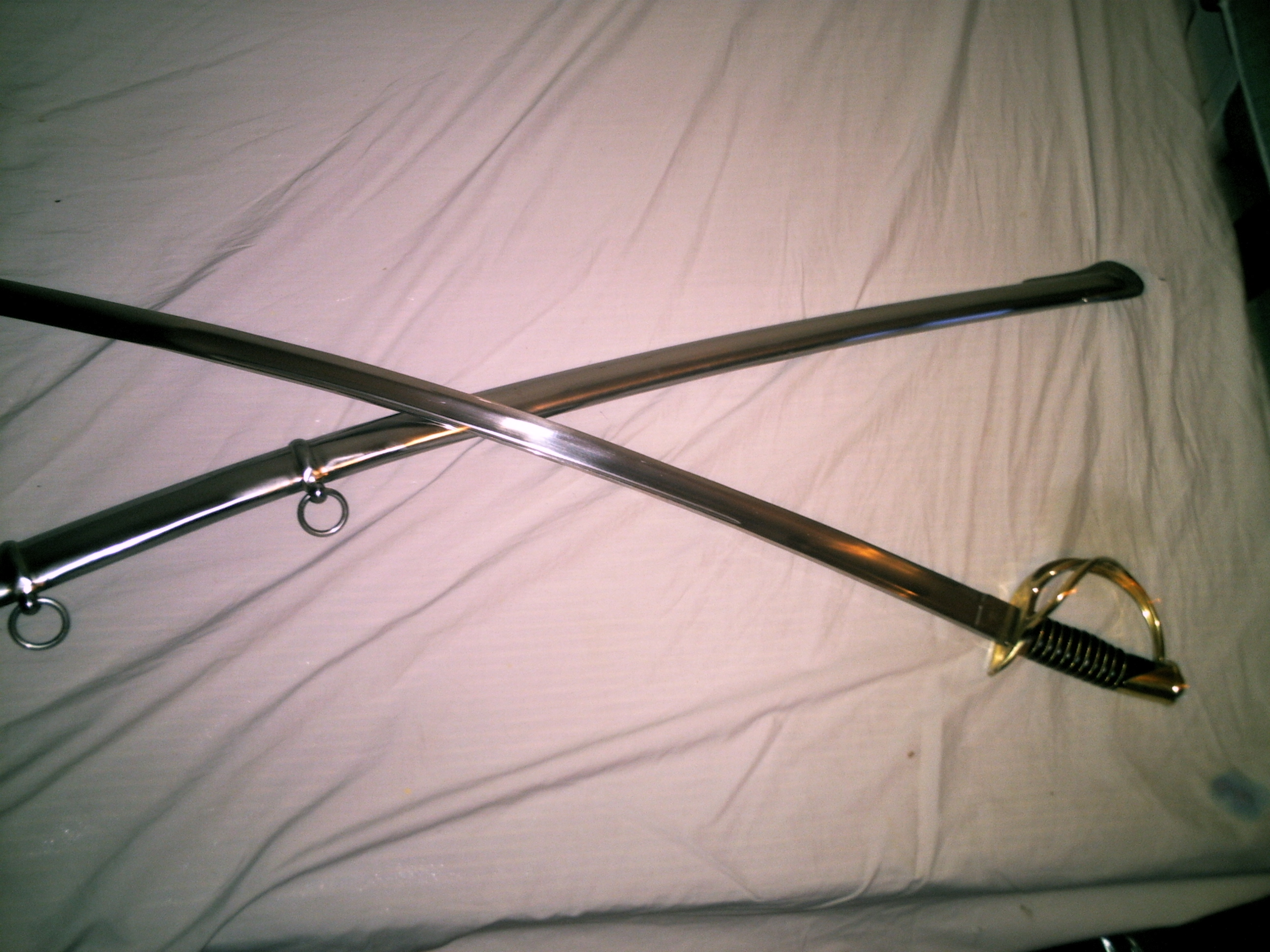
- Type: Saber
- Place of origin: United States of America

Service history
- Used by: United States Army
- Wars: Mexican–American War; American Civil War

Specifications
- Mass: 2.5 lb (1.1 kg)
- Length: 44 in (110 cm)
- Blade length: 35 in (89 cm)
- Blade type: Single-edged, curved

The Model 1840 Cavalry Saber was based on the 1822 French hussar's sabre.

== Design ==
Unlike its replacement, the Model 1860 Light Cavalry Saber, the M1840 has a ridge around its quillon, a leather grip wrapped in wire (rather than grooves cut into the wooden handle) and a flat, slotted throat.

The M1840 is 44 inches (110 cm) long with a 35-inch (89 cm) blade and weighs roughly 2.5 pounds (1.1 kg).

The M1840 was designed for slashing, and because of its heavy flat-backed blade was given the nickname "Old Wristbreaker".

== Adoption ==
The 1840 saber was adopted due to the army's dissatisfaction with its predecessor the Model 1833 Dragoon Saber, the first cavalry sword adopted by the US Army.

The iron-hilted M1833 was based on a Napoleonic-era British sword used by heavy cavalry and reputed to wrap "rubber like around a man's head and was only good for cutting butter".

It was evident a replacement was needed so in 1838 the US Ordnance Dept bought British, French and Prussian swords and field-tested them. The troopers overwhelmingly preferred the French saber, and a copy of it was put into production in 1844.

A total of 2,000 were ordered and by 1846, 600 were in frontline service. An ornate gilded version of this earlier sword was used by General Philip Sheridan during the Civil War; Sheridan had its sheath engraved with the battles he participated in.

The 1840 saber was used during the Mexican–American War by US Cavalry. The main contractors were Ames of Cabotville, Horstmann, and Tiffany but due to the large number of swords required at least 1,000 were made in Germany by S&K and imported.

Some troopers used Prussian sabers as an alternative, which in contrast to the M1840 had straight blades.

When production ceased in 1858 over 23,700 had been made. During the American Civil War it continued to be issued to Union Cavalry as in the early years it was more readily available than the M1860. George B. McClellan carried one at the front. Many were also used by the Confederacy including General Nathan Bedford Forrest who had both edges of his sword sharpened to increase combat effectiveness. The saber was also used by highest ranking commanders, such as Albert Sidney Johnston.

== Gallery ==
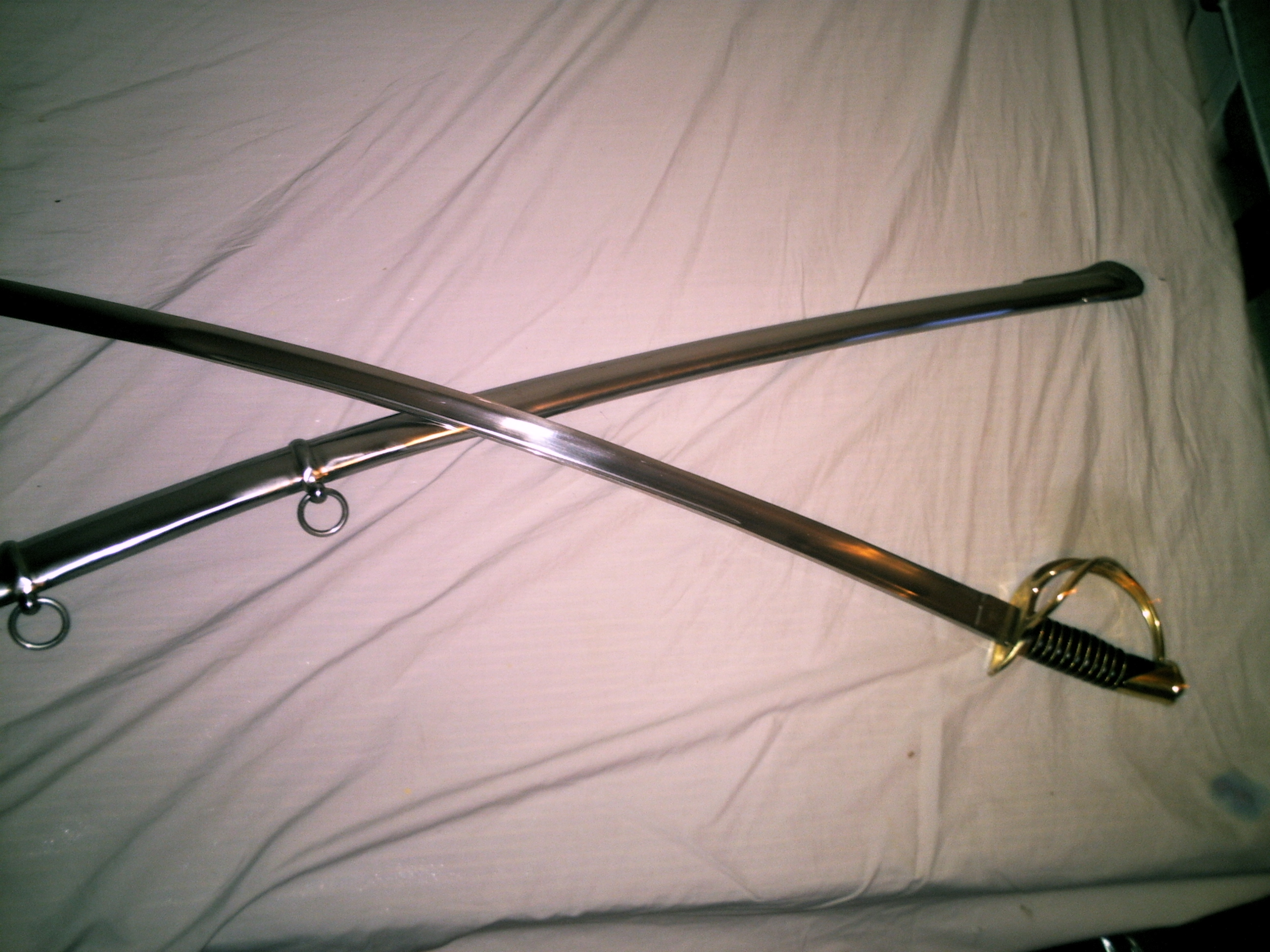
Old Wristbreaker

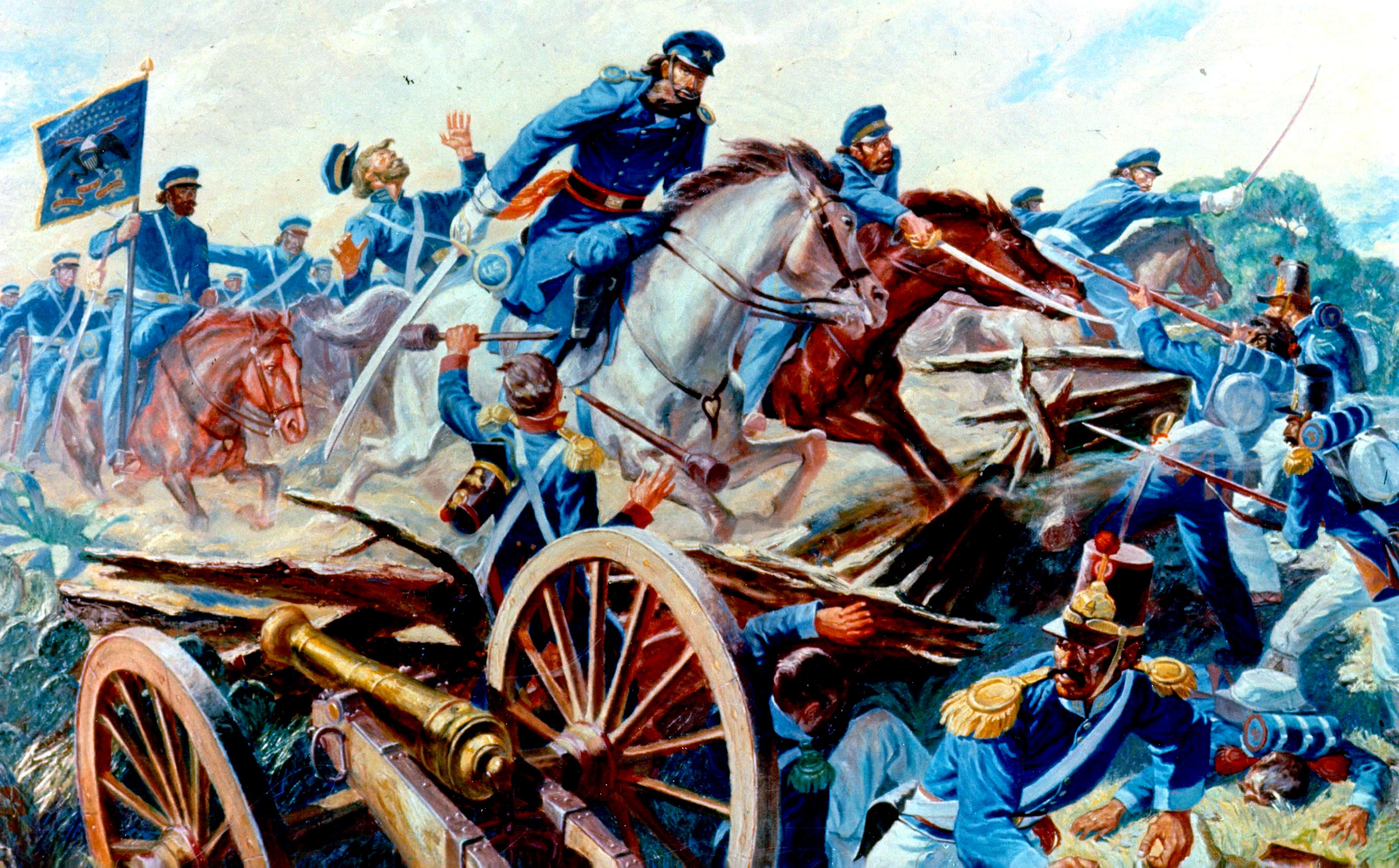
In the cavalry charges of the Mexican War US Dragoons used their sabers to slash their way through enemy lines

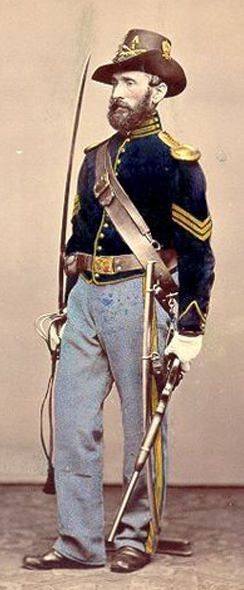
Union Cavalry Sergeant with 1840 saber
