= Home guard =

Title given to military organizations

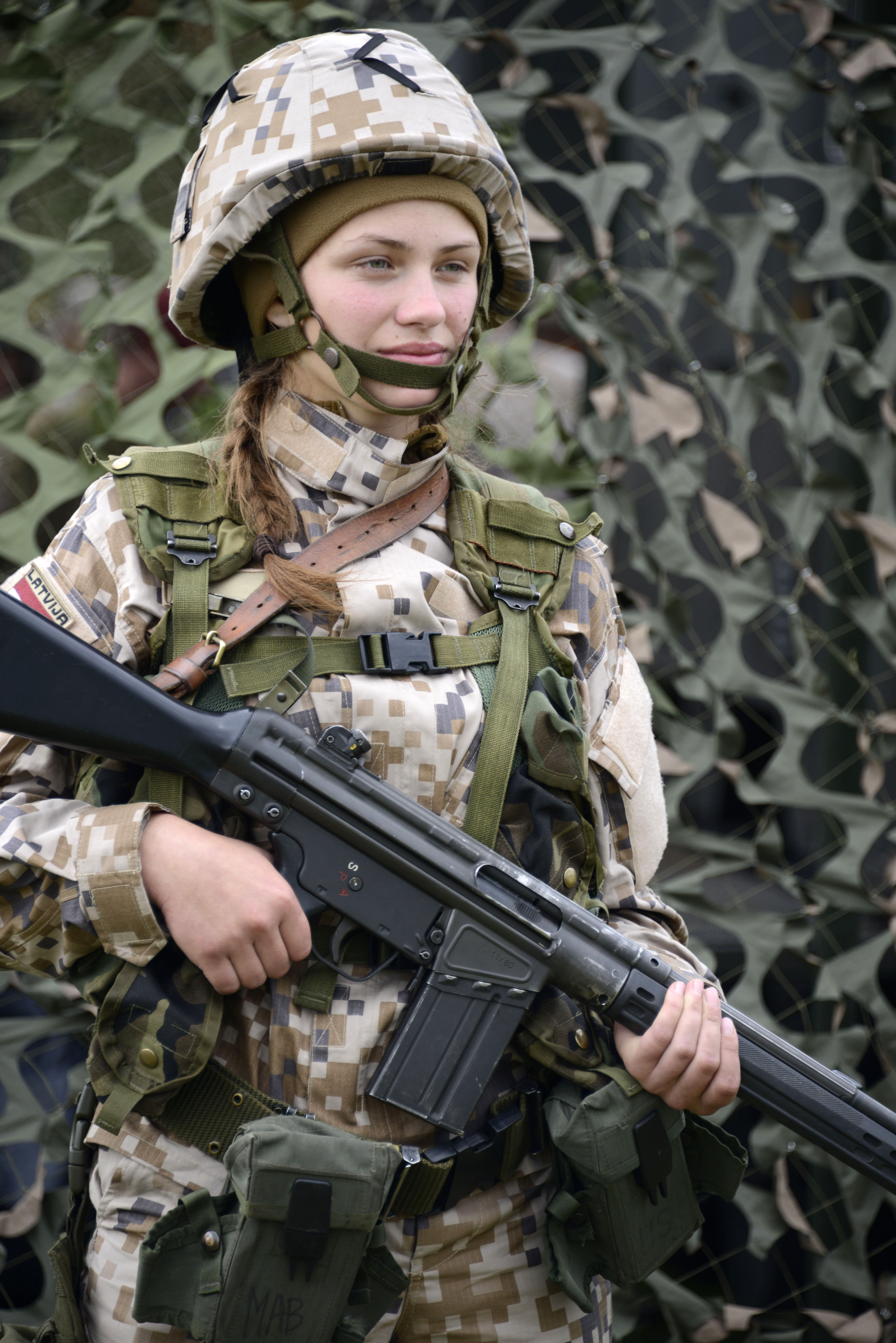
A Latvian National Guard soldier guards the battalion tactical operations center during the Strong Guard 2016 (Zobens 2016) distinguished visitor's day.

Home guard is a title given to military organizations at various times, with the implication of an emergency or reserve force raised for local defense.

The term "home guard" was first officially used in the American Civil War, starting with units formed by German immigrants in Missouri, and may derive from possible historical use of the term Heimwehr ("home guard") to describe units officially known as Landwehr ("country guard"), or from an attempted translation of landwehr.

== Military units ==
=== Active ===
Country	Name	Active
Belarus	Territorial Defense Troops of Belarus	2002–
Bermuda	Royal Bermuda Regiment	1965–
Canada	Canadian Rangers	1942–
Cayman Islands	Cayman Islands Regiment	2020–
Denmark	Danish Home Guard	1949–
Estonia	Estonian Defence League	1918–1940, 1990–
Falklands	Falkland Islands Defence Force	1892–
Germany	Heimatschutz of Bundeswehr	1965–2007, 2019–
Gibraltar	Royal Gibraltar Regiment	1958–
India	Indian Home Guard	1962–
Latvia	Latvian National Guard	1991–
Lithuania	Lithuanian Riflemen's Union	1918–1940, 1989–
Lithuania	Lithuanian National Defence Volunteer Forces	1991–
Lithuania	Lithuanian Armed Forces Military Commandant's Offices Command	2025–
Montserrat	Royal Montserrat Defence Force	1898–
Norway	Norwegian Home Guard	1946–
Poland	Polish Territorial Defense Force	2017–
Russia	Russian Territorial Defense Force	2022–
Sri Lanka	Sri Lankan Home Guard	1986–
Sweden	Swedish Home Guard	1940–
Turks and Caicos	Turks and Caicos Islands Regiment	2020–
Ukraine	Ukrainian Territorial Defense Forces	2022–
United States	State defense forces of State governments and Territory governments	1917–

=== Historical & Defunct ===
- Aizsargi (Latvia, 1919–1940)
- Home Guard (Unionist), during the American Civil War
- Civilian Irregular Defense Group program (1961-1970) during the Vietnam War
- Confederate Home Guard (1861–1865) during the American Civil War
- Croatian Home Guard, several historic military formations during 19th and 20th century
- Czechoslovak Home Guard (1918–1919)
- Home Guard (Austria) (Heimwehr) (1920–1938) paramilitary unit of Fatherland Front Party
- Home Guard (New Zealand) (1940–1943)
- Home Guard (United Kingdom) (1940–1944) (1952-1957)
- Home Service Force, British force for the 1980s-90s.
- Indian Home Guard, units raised from Indian tribes to support the Unionists in the American Civil War
- Kikuyu Home Guard, a government paramilitary force in Kenya (1953–1955)
- Malayan Home Guard, auxiliary volunteer police forces in Malaya during Malayan Emergency
- Missisquoi Home Guard (The Red Sashes) (1868-1870)
- Narodnoe Opolcheniye, Russia
- Pacific Coast Militia Rangers (1942-1945)
- Slovene Home Guard (1943–1945)
- Veterans Guard of Canada (1940–1947)
- Volkssturm, Nazi Germany (1944-1945)
- Volunteer Defence Corps (Australia) (1940-1944)
- Volunteer Fighting Corps, Japanese armed citizen militia (1945)

== Similar units ==
- Auxiliary Units
- City guard
- Civil Guard (disambiguation)
- Gendarmerie
- Home Guard (India)
- Home Army (Armia Krajowa), Poland, World War II
- Fencibles, British temporary militias
- Boeitai, a Japanese home guard force of World War II
- Kondei, ancient Japanese militia of the Nara and Heian periods
- Local Defence troops (Finland)
- Militia
- Ordenanças, Portuguese home guard from 1570 to 1831
- Omakaitse, Estonian Home Guard in World War II
- United States Coast Guard Reserve "temporary reservists" during World War II
- United States Guards
- Wachdienst, an auxiliary organisation erected by the Third Reich in Germany during the last months of World War II

== Other ==
- Home Guard (Shannara), in Terry Brooks' novel series
- Home Guard potato, a variety of first early potato

== See also ==
- List of established military terms
- Gendarmerie
- Home guard
- Paramilitary
- Irregular military
- Irregular warfare
- Insurgency weapons and tactics
- Internal security
