= Ball Carbine =

United States lever action repeating carbine

Ball Carbine Lamson & Ball Carbine
- Type: Lever-action carbine

Service history
- Wars: Fenian Raids; Battle of Eccles Hill

Production history
- Produced: 1864-1865
- No. built: 1,002 approx

Specifications
- Length: 37 3/4 in x 2 3/8 in (95.885 cm x 6.0325 cm)
- Cartridge: .56-56 Rimfire.44 Henry
- Action: Lever-action
- Rate of fire: 14-20 rounds per minute
- Effective firing range: 400 yards (365.76 meters)
- Feed system: 7-round tubular magazine

The Ball Carbine or Ball Model 1865 Carbine, sometimes referred to as the Lamson & Ball Carbine, is a single-shot lever action repeating carbine patented in 1864 by Albert Ball of Worcester, Massachusetts. Approximately 1,002 Ball carbines were produced during its two years of production, the carbine features aspects of a hybrid between two very important and recognizable firearm designs: the Spencer repeating rifle and the Henry rifle.

== Design ==
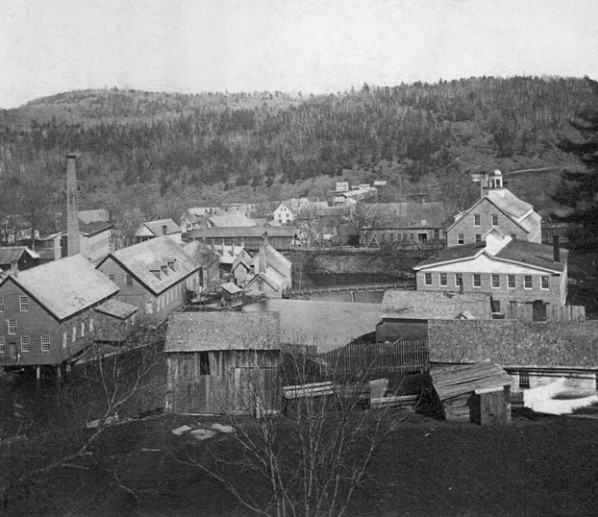
The armory complex in Windsor, Vermont around the time of the Civil War, of Lamson, Goodnow & Yale

The Ball Carbine is a lever-action repeating carbine designed by Albert Ball in 1864. The Ball carbine is a seven-shot .50 caliber carbine, which was chambered for the .56-56 Spencer rimfire cartridge, the carbine operates on the same design as the later Winchester rifle. According to the National Firearms Museum "To load, cartridges are fed through an opening in the right side of the receiver frame and into a tubular magazine located under the barrel. Lowering the trigger guard lever opens the receiver and feeds a cartridge from the magazine into the chamber. As in the Palmer carbine, the hammer features a projecting lip that strikes the cartridge rim. The 20-inch barrel was blued, while other metallic parts were casehardened. It has a two-piece walnut stock, and total length is 37 inches". The carbine features an L-shaped aperture leaf sight which is graduated for 100 yards on the shorter end, and has a 400 yard aperture and a 600 yard notch on the longer end of the sight. The Ball carbine features a 7-round tube magazine .56-56 Spencer rimfire cartridges.

== Production ==
Contracts for the Ball carbine were produced in Windsor, Vermont by the Ebenezer G. Lamson & Company, Albert Ball's which produced the 1,002 carbines via contract. Ebenezer G. Lamson (1814-1891) was a machinist and textile manufacturer originally from Shelburne, Massachusetts. In 1858 Lamson purchased the asset of the Robbins and Lawrence Company of Windsor, Vermont, now the American Precision Museum, and briefly worked in the field of firearm manufacturing. including the manufacturing of the Ball carbine. Lamson was contracted in 1864 to manufacture roughly 1,000 of Ball's patented seven-breechloading carbines.

== Civilian and Militia Use ==
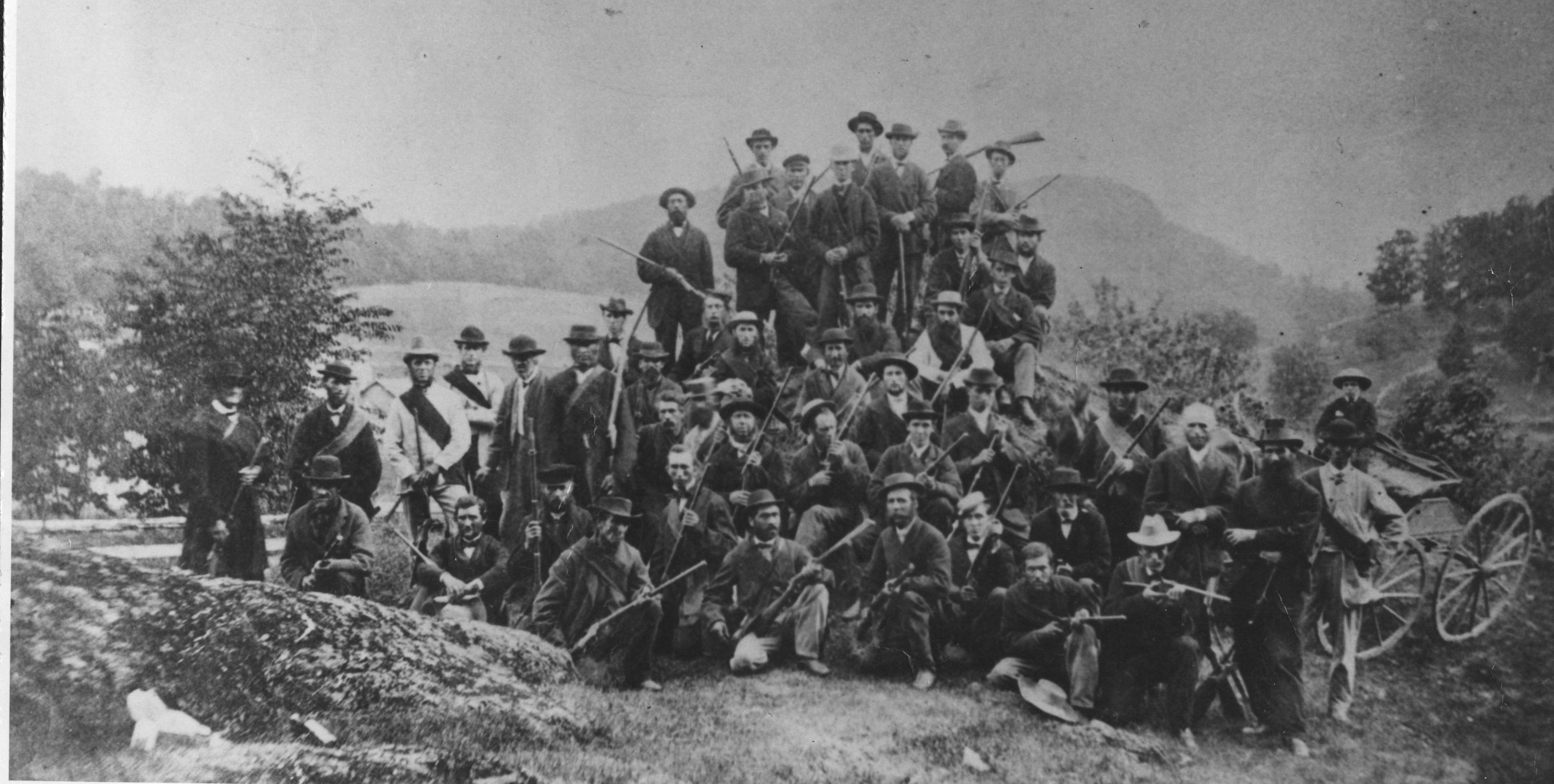
The Canadian Red Sash Home Guard (Écharpes Rouges) militia of Dunham, Quebec were prominent users of the Ball carbine along with the Ballard Rifle and carbine during the Battle of Eccles Hill.

Approximately 1,002 Ball Carbines were produced by Lamson and delivered in May, 1865. Although Ball carbines are generally considered an arm of the American Civil War, they did not appear to be issued or see service by the wars end as the war had ended in May,1865. During the postwar era the Ball carbine were a popular firearm amongst civilian firearm owners, some Ball carbines were converted to shoot .44 Henry. Several of the militia members of the Red Sash Canadian militia purchased and utilized the Ball carbine during the Battle of Eccles Hill during the Fenian raids in 1870.

== Ball's Repeating Musket ==
Both Lamson and Ball were responsible for two different breechloading musket designs based on the Ball carbine. Unlike the carbine, only three known examples exist of Ball's repeating musket: one is owned by the Institute of Military Technology in Titusville, Florida, one is owned by the George Moller Collection via the Rock Island Arsenal auction company, and one is owned by the Tøjhusmuseet (Danish Army Museum) in Copenhagen. The musket version of Ball's patent appears to be carbine actions fitted into long barrels and stocks similar to the Springfield Model 1861.
