= Teodoro Rodrigues de Morais =

Brazilian doctor and politician

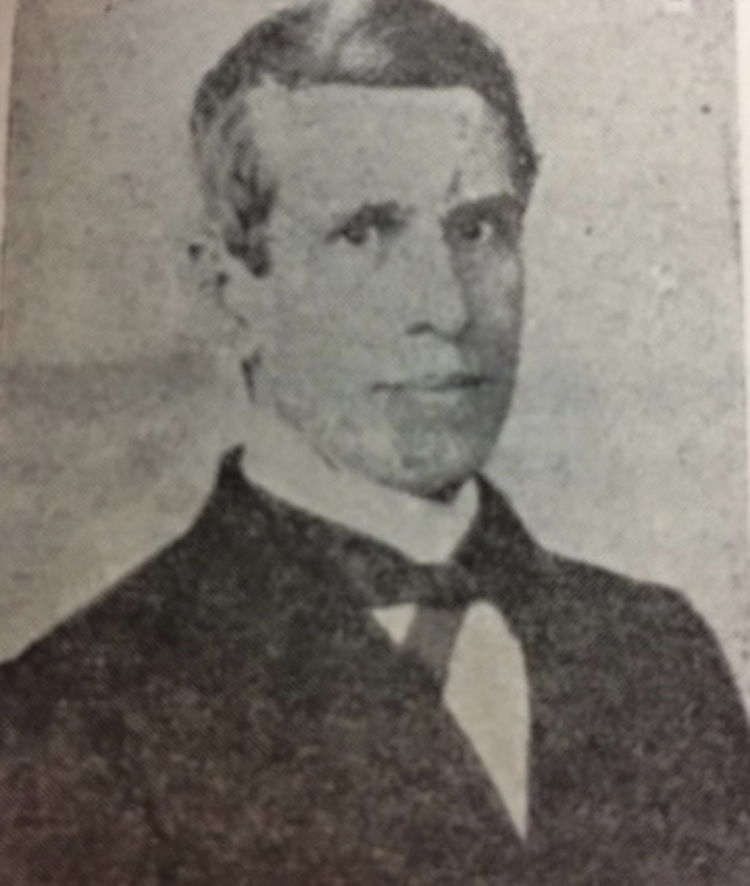

President of Goiás
- Monarch: Pedro II of Brazil

Vice-President of Goiás
- In office 1878–1883

General Deputy
- In office 1864–1866

Personal details
- Born: November 9, 1816 United Kingdom of Portugal, Brazil and the Algarves
- Died: 12 June 1897 (aged 80) Rio de Janeiro
- Party: Conservative Party (Brazil)

Military service
- Allegiance: Imperial Brazilian Army
- Years of service: 1842—1886
- Rank: Medic General

Teodoro Rodrigues de Morais (9 November 1816—12 June 1897) was a Brazilian doctor and politician. He served as the state president of Goiás, and as a general deputy. He was also the first from his state to graduate in medicine.

Teodoro is remembered for his humanitarian efforts, such as supporting abolition, and mainly for his support at giving the wider public more access to healthcare.

== Biography ==
=== Family and formation ===
Teodoro Rodrigues de Morais was born in 1816, a member of a wealthy family belonging to the gentry. His family was very influential in the administrative, political, and economic affairs of the province. His father, Jerônimo Rodrigues de Moraes, was Captain-major of Jaraguá. Raimundo José da Cunha Matos described him in his travels in 1823;

"I was hosted by the Captain Commander of the district (Jaraguá), Mr. Jerônimo Rodrigues de Moraes, a rich and industrious man, who treated me with the greatest possible ostentation in this place."

Teodoro was the uncle of João Bonifácio Gomes de Siqueira and Jerônimo Rodrigues de Morais Jardim, with several other family members being influential during the 19th and 20th centuries. At age 19, in 1835, Teodoro was sent to the Faculty of Medicine in Rio de Janeiro, where he graduated in 1840.

=== Medical work ===
While attending college, he met Moretti Foggia, an Italian immigrant, and Francisco Antônio de Azeredo, who frequently collaborated with Teodoro in the medical field. Teodoro's return to Goiás was greatly celebrated by the province's administrators, and he soon took up his long-vacant medical post at the São Pedro de Alcântara hospital.

Because of his wealthy family, Teodoro decided to offer his services free of charge for the benefit of poor members of society. During his 44-year medical career, Teodoro reached the rank of Colonel Surgeon-Major of the army in 1870 and in 1886 became a retired medical general. Throughout his career, Teodoro worked to spread medicine and health improvements in his province, being in charge of the construction of the public cemetery of Goiás, and also for the dissemination of vaccines. Teodoro is considered one of the main disseminators of scientific medicine in Goiás in the 19th century.

In 1884 he was transferred to the Court in Rio de Janeiro, where he served at the Praia Vermelha Military School. In June 1885 he was appointed to the Province of Rio Grande do Sul, where Deodoro da Fonseca was the Commander of Arms. However, he fell ill during the journey, and was deemed unfit for service by the military junta, and returned to Rio de Janeiro.

=== Paraguayan War ===
In 1864, Teodoro had become a general deputy, but this did not interfere with his medical work. His nephew, João Bonifácio Gomes de Siqueira, was the president of the province at the time, who asked him to help with:

Preparo do apoio de uma ambulância, devidamente acondicionada para a marcha do Batalhão de Caçadores (tropas de Goiás), com destino a província Mato-grossense.

“Preparing the support of an ambulance, properly equipped for the march of the Hunters Battalion (troops from Goiás), destined for the province of Mato Grosso.”

Teodoro accompanied Cândido Manoel de Oliveira Quintana, where he participated in the retreat from Laguna. In 1869, Teodoro was moved to Mato Grosso to serve as Delegate of the Surgeon-Major of the Army, where he remained until November 1870, when he was sent back to Goiás

== Political career ==
Teodoro served as a general deputy representing Goiás in the 12th legislature during the Empire of Brazil, during 1864-1866. In the session of 17th of may, 1864, he presented a piece of legislation which defined the state borders of Goiás and the province of Mato Grosso.

Teodoro was the first vice-president of Goiás, and he exercised the presidency on five occasions; 25 of June to 22 july, 1878, 14 of January to 18 of march 1879, 28 of December 1880 until February 1, 1881, December 9, 1881 until June 20, 1882 and 20 September 1882 until February 22 of 1883. He was the longest serving vice-president of the province during the monarchy (1878-1883)

=== Between Conservatism and Liberalism. ===
Teodoro, and his brothers, were part of the typographical society that founded Tribuna Livre. Tribuna Livre was a periodical that circulated between 1878-1884 in Goiás. Its objective was to serve as a space for debates on abolitionism, liberalism, and education. Their original mission was to:

“Give space to the defense of the oppressed in their civil and political rights, whatever their belief or politics.”

Capital desse lugar à defesa dos oprimidos em seus direitos civis e políticos, qualquer que fosse a sua crença ou política

However, after Tribuna Livre became an “organ of the liberal party,” under the influence of the Bulhões, Teodoro and his allies abandoned the newspaper, as they considered that this distorted the “ends they had in mind.” Even more so when he was president in 1878, the first emergence of republican manifestation arose in Goiás, with the publication “Bocayuva.” Teodoro, as president, reacted indifferently and did not give his support;

recebemos e agradecemos os dous primeiros números deste periódico, que se publica na capital, em dias alternados, e que tem por missão pugnar pelas idéias republicanas.

“we received and appreciate the first two issues of this periodical, which is published in the capital on alternate days, and whose mission is to advocate for republican ideas."

Without official support, and due to lack of funds, Bocayuva ceased publication after only seven months

Teodoro Rodrigues de Morais was a member of the conservative party.

== Honours ==
- Commander of the Imperial Order of Aviz,1886
