= Red Sash Home Guard (Canadian Militia) =

Home guard and militia from Dunham, Quebec

- Écharpes Rouges
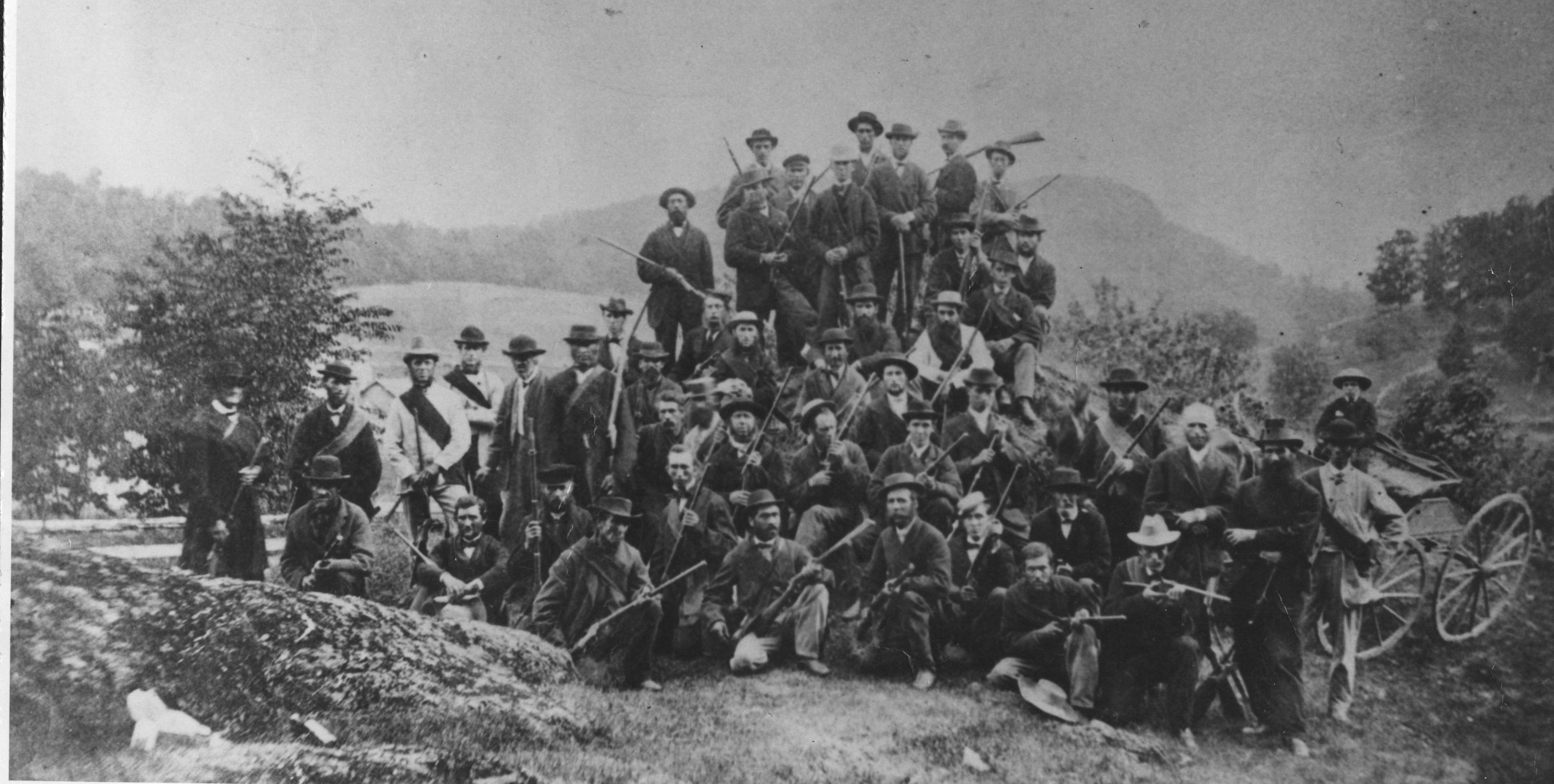
- Militiamen of the Red Sashes in June 1870.
- Active: June 20, 1868–June 1870
- Country: Canada
- Branch: Canadian Militia
- Type: Militia
- Size: 140 (initially 40)
- Nickname: Red Sashes (Écharpes Rouges)
- Equipment: Ballard Rifle; Lamson & Ball Carbine
- Engagements: Fenian Raids; Battle of Eccles Hill

Commanders
- Captain: Asa Westover

The Red Sash Home Guard, also called the Missisquoi Home Guard, the Red Sash Guard, Dunham’s Red Sashes, or simply the Red Sashes (French: Écharpes Rouges) were a home guard and Canadian militia from Dunham, Quebec, which fought at the Battle of Eccles Hill during the Fenian raids on May 25, 1870.

== History ==
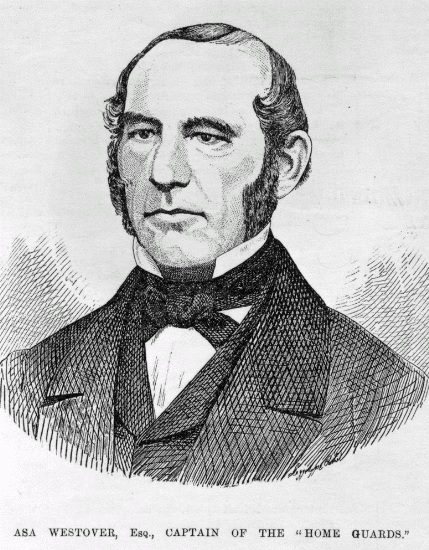
Asa Westover, Captain of the Missisquoi Home Guards. June 18, 1870.

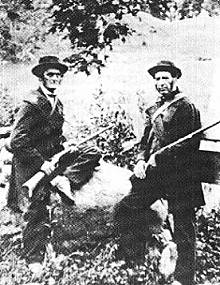
Canadian Home-Guard defending against Fenians in 1870. William Ten Eyck (left) and Asa Westover (right).

The Fenian raids, first beginning in 1866, left many Canadians living on the border with the United States feeling uneasy and fearful of the possibility of a complete invasion and takeover by the Fenian Brotherhood. In particular the citizens of Brome-Missisquoi had many of their homes burned in June 7-10, 1866, by Fenians who ransacked and vandalized farmsteads in southern Missisquoi County, Quebec. To put a stop to a second Fenian invasion of the county citizens in Dunham, Quebec, and the surrounding areas created a militia under the leadership of local farmer Asa Westover Jr. (1817–1902) alongside James Gibbins Pell (1825–1913) and Andrew Ten Eyck (1820–1898), all of Dunham. Because the federal government refused to arm Westover's militia with the newly-adopted Snider–Enfield rifle chambered in .577 Snider, Westover resorted to privately purchasing rifles for the militia. Westover chose to arm the militia entirely with the Ballard Rifle, a single-shot rifle with a falling-block action. 40 Ballard rifles were purchased in Massachusetts and were chambered in .44 caliber with 30-inch (760 mm) barrels. Westover's personal Ballard rifle is on display at the Lac-Brome Museum in Brome Lake, Quebec.

In contrast to most units of the Canadian Militia, Westover's Red Sash militia continually met over the next several years to drill and conduct marksmanship training, something the regular Canadian militia did not do, which greatly harmed them at the Battle of Ridgeway. The militia had no official uniform, as the militia's name implies, the only "uniform" the militia had was a red sash worn by the militiamen as a form of combat identification.

== Role in the Battle of Eccles Hill ==
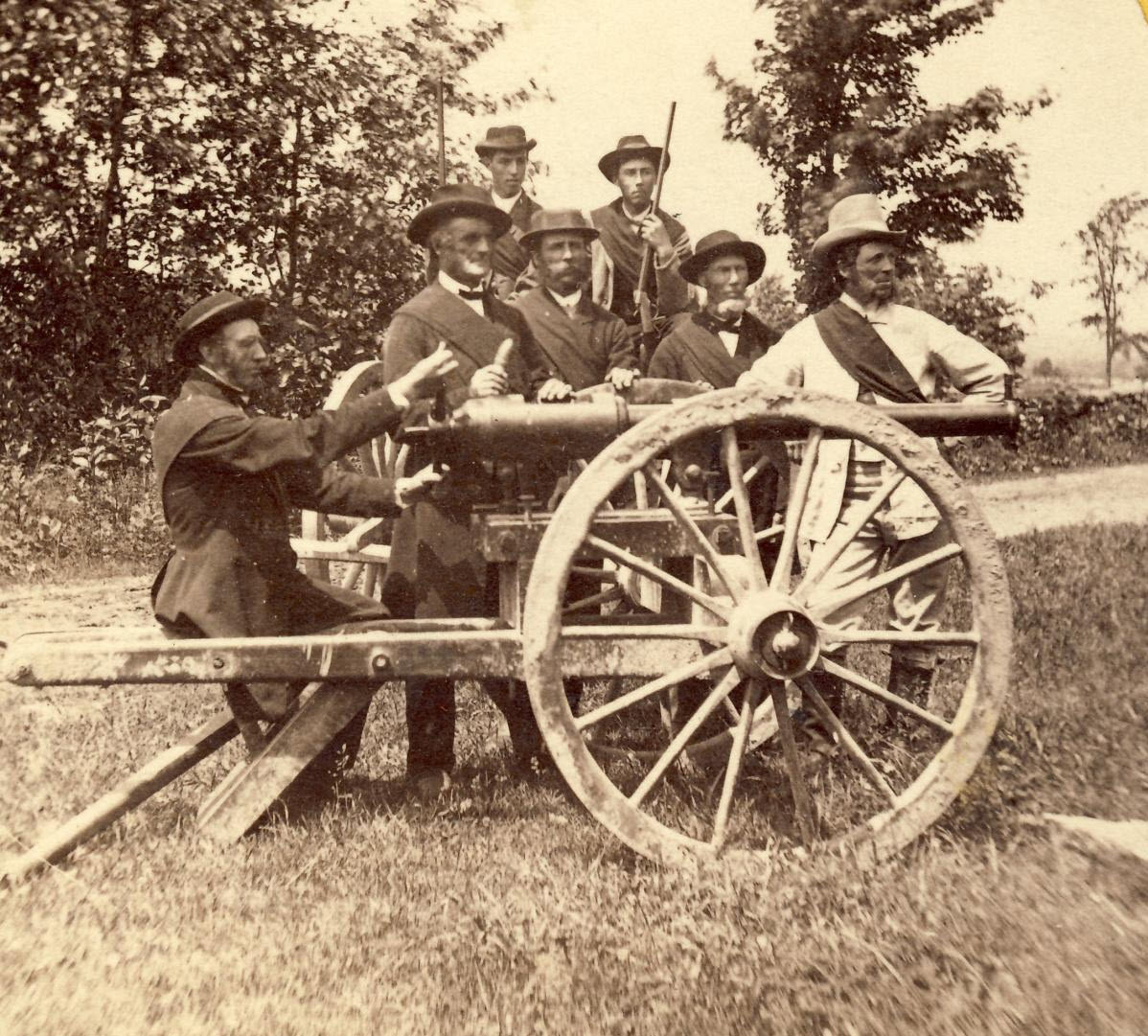
Red Sashes with a Fenian cannon at Eccles Hill, 1870. Front row: Asa Westover, Andrew Ten Eyck, Arthur Gilmour, Charles Galer and J. G. Pell. Back row:James Westover and Allen Hogaboon. (Missisquoi Historical Society Collections)

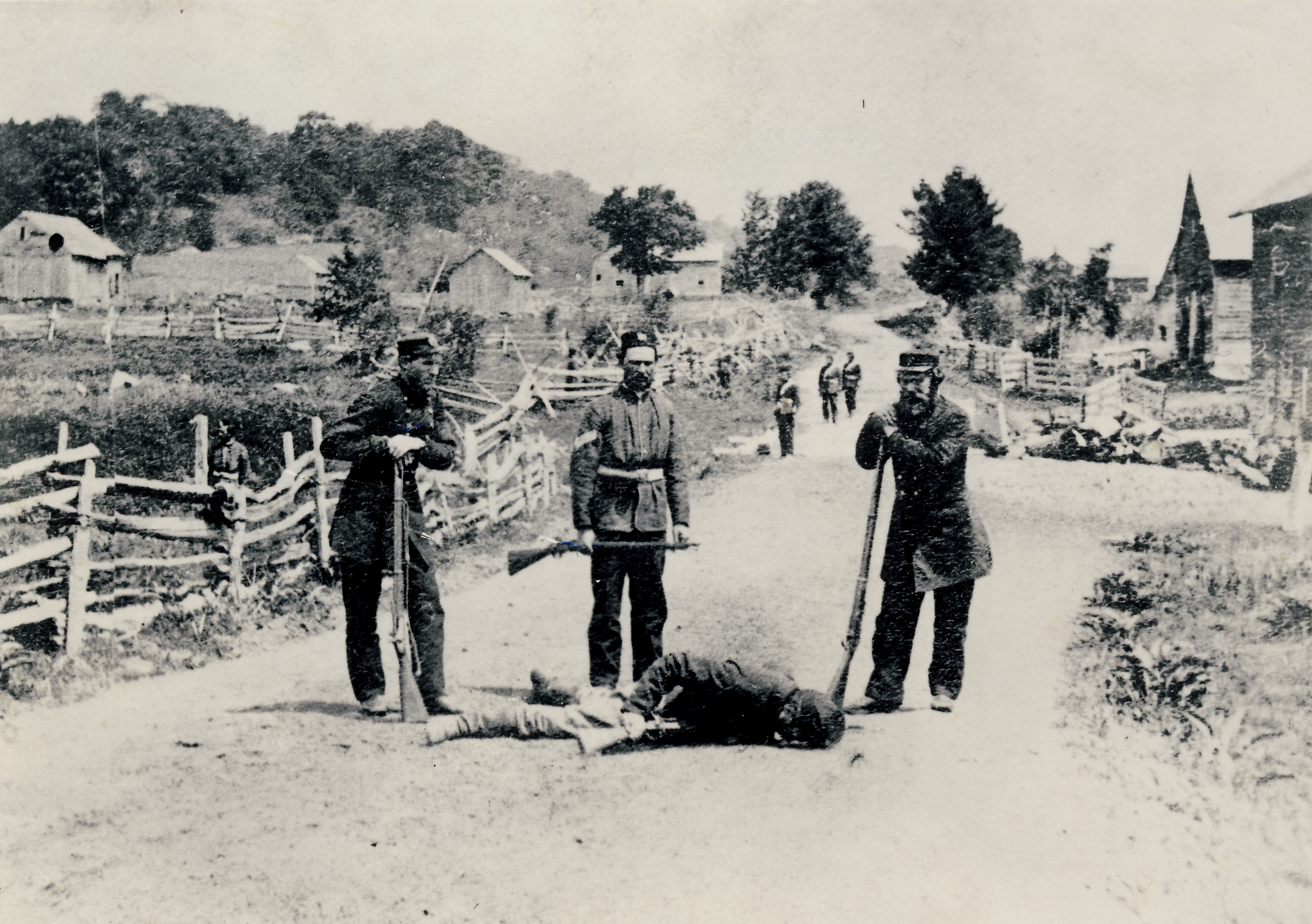
Border Volunteers (two officers and a corporal) stand over a Fenian slain during the Battle of Eccles Hill, 1870. Courtesy of the Missisquoi Historical Society Collections.

On the morning of May 25, 1870, 37 of Westover's Red Sashes and 21 volunteer soldiers from the 60th Missisquoi Battalion in Dunham hid at Eccles Hill to await the Fenians. The Red Sashes were the first Canadians to be ready for battle on the road from St. Albans (city), Vermont. Around 11:30 in the morning the first Fenian units had arrived from Vermont in the vicinity of Eccles Hill. The Red Sashes ambushed the Fenians with intense fire from their marksmanship training, more being wounded than killed. John Rowe was the only Irish soldier killed on the Canadian side of the border during the ensuing battle. As the battle continued more of the Red Sash militia turned up to the fight, some being armed with the Lamson and Ball repeating carbine. The Red Sashes and 60th Missisquoi Battalion were eventually reinforced by Colonel William Osborne Smith and later the 3rd Battalion (Victoria Rifles of Montreal), which tipped the battle in favour of the Canadians.

During the battle the Red Sashes and 60th Missisquoi charged the only cannon the Fenian invading force had brought with them from Vermont and captured it. According to P.G. Smith of Canada's History "With great difficulty, officers restrained the jubilant Red Sash men and militia soldiers from pursuing their enemies across the border. The Home Guards retrieved the cannon, which they regarded as a great war trophy. To this day it rests on the summit of Eccles Hill as a memorial to the Canadian defenders".

On May 30, 1870, Lieutenant-General James Alexander Lindsay commander of the British forces in Canada, expressed his gratitude to the Red Sash militia and the defenders of Eccles Hill stating "Their good service, energy, and promptitude have achieved the utter defeat and the demoralization of the Fenians”.

== Monuments ==
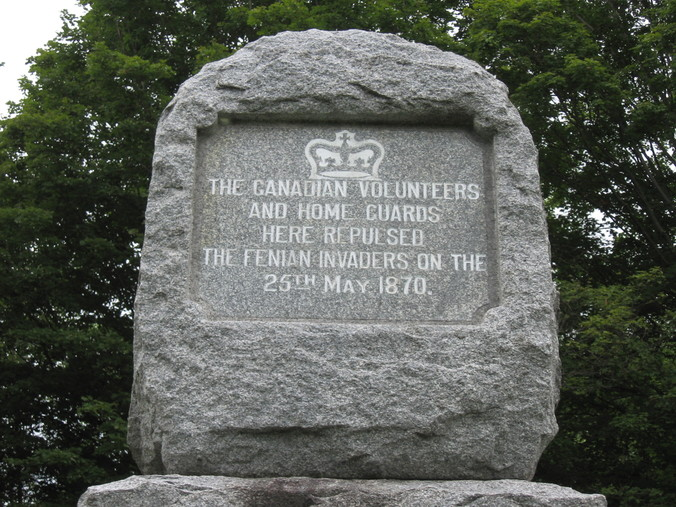
Plate on the forefront of the monument at Eccles Hill.

A monument commemorating the battle and service of both the 60th Missisquoi Battalion and the Red Sash Home Guard stands today in Frelighsburg near the Canadian border with the state of Vermont. The monument is listed on the Canadian Register of Historic Places. The cannon captured by the Red Sash militia can still be seen at the Battle of Eccles Hill National Historic Site of Canada.
