= .56-56 Spencer =

American black powder rifle cartridge

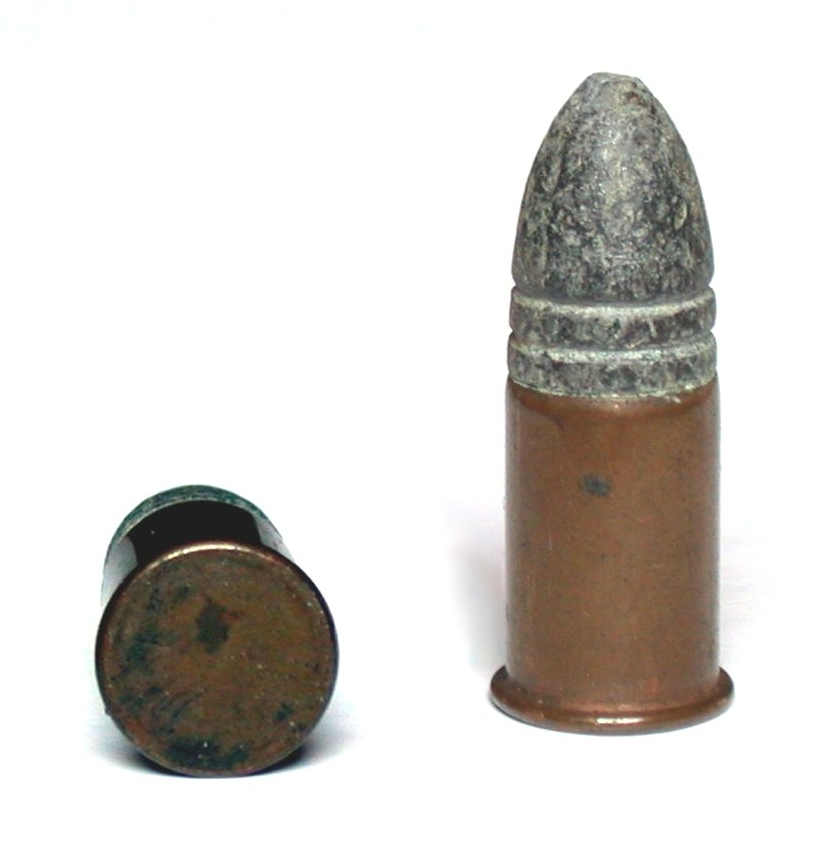
- Type: Rifle
- Place of origin: United States

Production history
- Designer: Christopher Spencer

Specifications
- Case type: Rimmed, straight
- Bullet diameter: .550 in (14.0 mm)
- Neck diameter: .560 in (14.2 mm)
- Shoulder diameter: .560 in (14.2 mm)
- Base diameter: .560 in (14.2 mm)
- Rim diameter: .645 in (16.4 mm)
- Case length: .875 in (22.2 mm)
- Overall length: 1.545 in (39.2 mm)
- Primer type: Rimfire
- Maximum pressure (CIP): 11,600 psi (80 MPa)

Ballistic performance
Bullet mass/type	Velocity	Energy
350 gr (23 g)	1,200 ft/s (370 m/s)	1,125 ft⋅lbf (1,525 J)
- Sources: Barnes & Amber

The .56-56 Spencer (14×22mmRF) was an American black powder rifle cartridge. It was the first self-contained metallic cartridge for a repeating rifle. (Note: Although the precise precedence is questioned over its contemporary, the Henry rifle.)

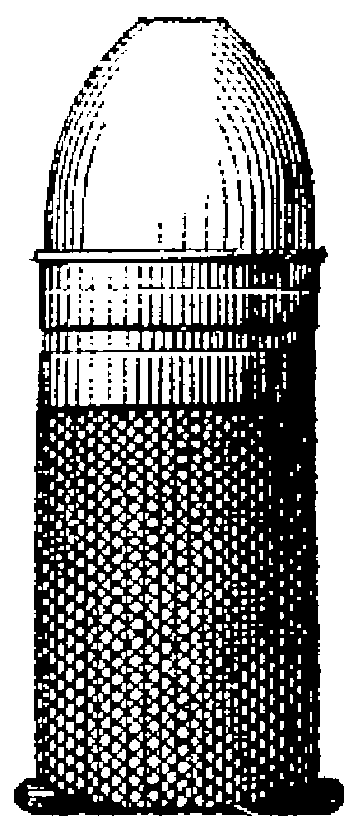
.56-56 Spencer cartridge, bullet diameter 0.546 inches

Designed for the Spencer repeating rifle and carbine, patented 6 March 1860, it was employed by cavalry during the American Civil War, first appearing at Sharpsburg in rifle form. No Spencer carbines were on issue at the Battle of Gettysburg, though two units under Custer had the rifles. The .56-56 was loaded with a slug of 350–360 gr (22.7–23.3 g) over 42–45 gr (2.7–2.9 g) of black powder. It was loaded by a variety of companies, and was also used in the Ballard and Joslyn Model 1861 non-repeating breechloading rifles and carbines. It is a short-ranged cartridge, ineffective on anything larger than deer. Commercially loaded ammunition continued to be available into the 1920s and 1930s.

== Dimensions and nomenclature ==
The nomenclature of Spencer cartridges was unique. Unlike later cartridges such as the .44-40 Winchester and .45-70, where the first number indicated caliber and the second the charge weight, the .56-56 refers solely to the case. The first 56 is the diameter of the case at the base .56 inches (14.2 mm), measured just past the rim, and the second 56 is the diameter at the case mouth, also 0.56 in (14 mm). Later versions of the cartridge included the .56-52, .56-50, and .56-46, which had varying degrees of taper in the cases, to accommodate smaller diameter bullets. All of these cartridges are rimfire primed. The actual bullet diameter of the .56-56 varied between .54 and .555 inches (13.7-14.1 mm), depending on ammunition manufacturer. The .56-52, made by Spencer, and the .56-50, made by Springfield, differed only in the degree of crimp, with the .56-50 having a greater crimp; both fired 350-grain (23 g) .512-inch (13.0 mm) bullets. The .56-46 fired a 320-grain (21 g) - 330-grain (21 g) .465-inch (11.8 mm) bullet.

The Spencer rifle used a tubular magazine. To control the risk of accidental discharge owing to recoil, the .50 calibre round was reduced in calibre.

== See also ==
- Henry rifle
- List of rimfire cartridges
- 13 mm caliber
