= Rifles in the American Civil War =

During the American Civil War, an assortment of small arms found their way onto the battlefield. Though the muzzleloader percussion cap rifled musket was the most numerous weapon, being standard issue for the Union and Confederate armies, many other firearms, ranging from the single-shot breech-loading Sharps and Burnside rifles to the Spencer and the Henry rifles - two of the world's first repeating rifles - were issued by the hundreds of thousands, mostly by the Union. The Civil War brought many advances in firearms technology, most notably the widespread use of rifled barrels.

The impact that rifles had on combat in the Civil War is a subject of debate among historians. According to the traditional interpretation, the widespread employment of rifled firearms had a transformative effect that commanders failed to consider, resulting in terrible casualties from the continued use of outdated tactics. More recent scholarship has questioned this interpretation, arguing the impact was minimal and required no radical change in how armies fought. This debate is part of a larger discussion on whether the American Civil War is an early example of modern warfare or has more in common with Napoleonic warfare.

== Background ==
Historically, the smoothbore musket had been the primary weapon of the infantry, while the rifle was reserved for specialist units. In order for rifling to impart a spin upon a projectile, it must fit the projectile tightly, making loading and firing a rifle much slower than a musket, as most of these weapons were muzzleloaders at that time. In the decades leading up to the Civil War, several advances helped make the rifle a more practical weapon for the average soldier. The caplock replaced the flintlock, improving performance in wet weather and allowing for a slightly higher rate of fire, and the use of rifling with mechanically fitted bullets was tested by several inventors. However, it was the invention of the Minié ball which ultimately solved the problem of the slow-loading rifle. Conically shaped with a hollow base, the Minié ball was narrow enough to be easily loaded, but expanded upon firing to fit the rifling grooves. Rifled muskets quickly became the standard weapon of modern armies of the period, including the United States, while some smoothbore muskets were converted into rifles.

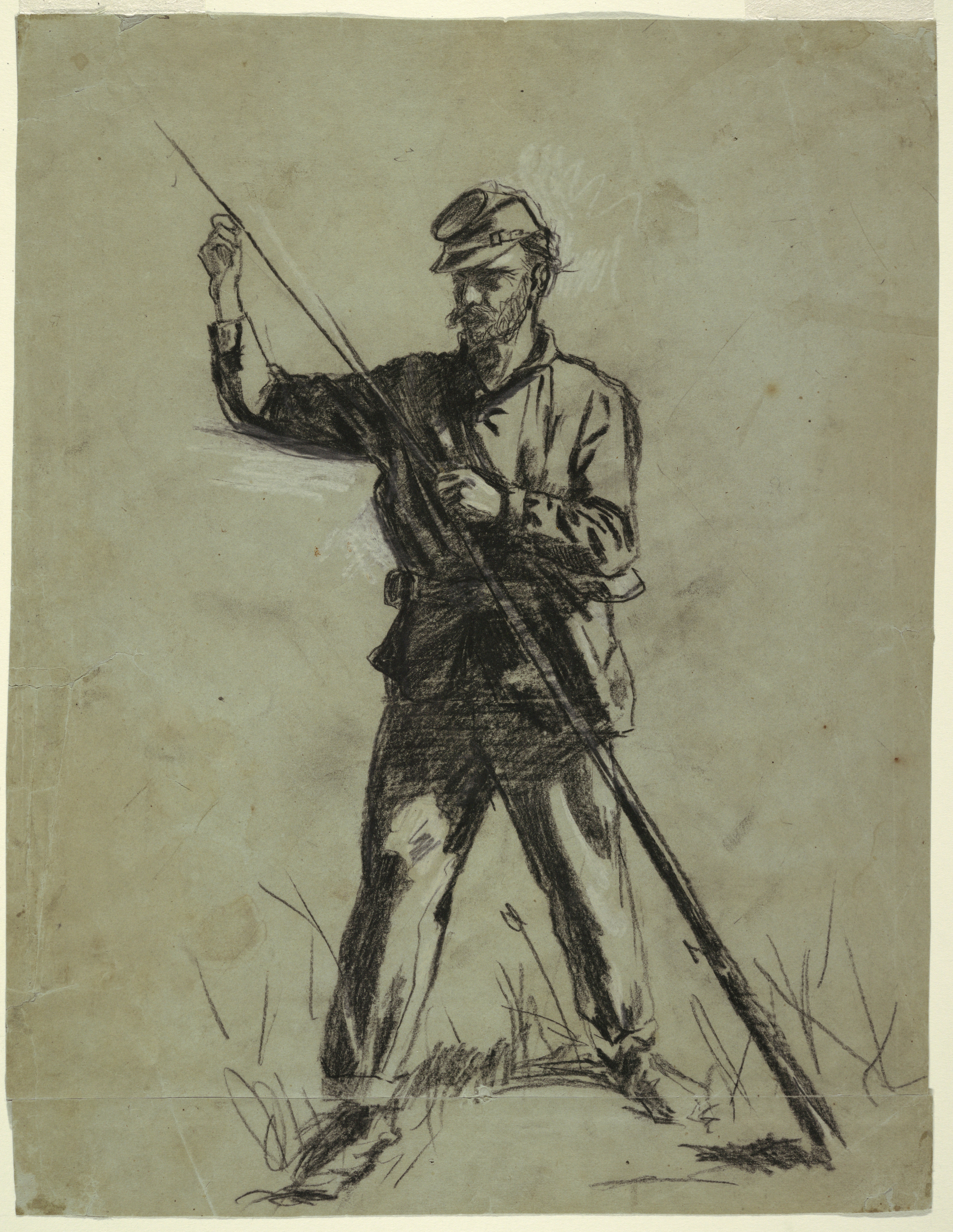
Drawing of a Civil War soldier loading a muzzleloader rifle

One significant advantage the rifled musket had over the smoothbore was its effective range. Whereas a smoothbore musket like the Brown Bess could be expected to accurately hit a target at a distance of several dozen yards, rifled muskets were reasonably accurate at a distance of 500 yards. Historians of the war such as James M. McPherson, Edward Hagerman, and LTC Jeffrey Gudmens have argued that the increased range of the rifled musket rendered the Napoleonic tactics with which Civil War commanders continued to fight obsolete and bloody. Rifled muskets not only blunted the frontal assault by enemy infantry but also neutralized the offensive capabilities of cavalry and field artillery and thereby led to the increased usage of trench warfare.

More recently, historians including Paddy Griffith, Mark Grimsley, and Brent Nosworthy have challenged this interpretation. Surveying a number of battles, they found that Civil War combat still largely took place at ranges similar to or slightly better than smoothbore muskets, suggesting no revolution had taken place in the way war was conducted. Allen C. Guelzo argues one technical reason such short ranges persisted was the continued use of black powder. Black powder fouled the rifling in the barrel and produced thick clouds of smoke which hung about the battlefield and obscured targets. Another reason was that rifling also slowed the speed of the bullet, which meant a lower muzzle velocity than smoothbore muskets and a curved trajectory. In order to hit a target at distances beyond 100 yards, the firer had to carefully adjust their sights and accurately estimate the range, which could be difficult in the havoc of battle. The curved trajectory of the bullet also meant there was a gap over which the bullet flew: a rifle musket sighted to a range of 500 yards would send the bullet clear over the head of a mounted cavalryman standing at a distance of 250 yards.

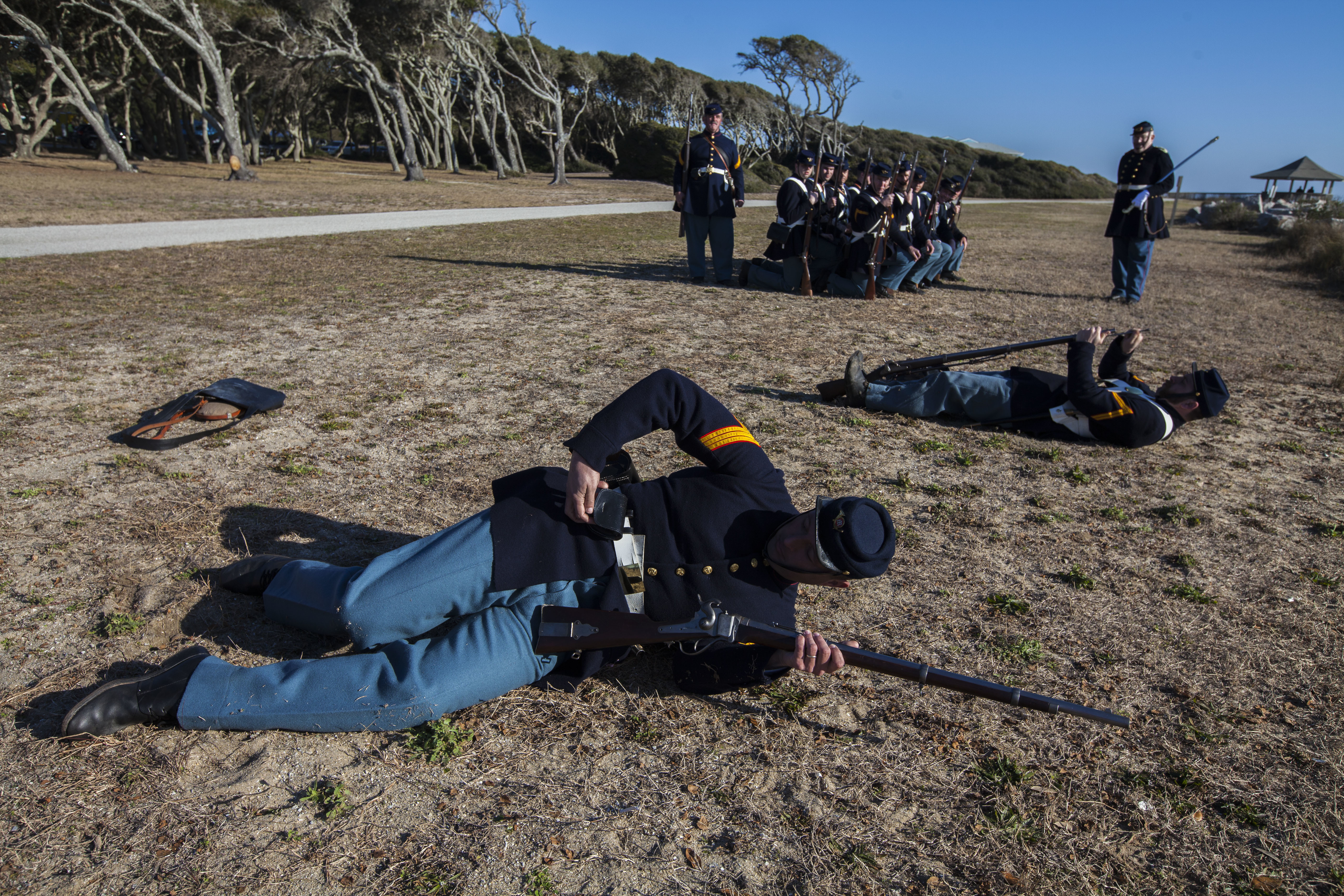
Historical reenactors demonstrate muzzleloading techniques from the prone position.

Training could help overcome some of these difficulties, but target practice was virtually unknown on either side of the Civil War. In the few weeks between its formation and going into battle, for example, the 24th Michigan had one recorded instance of target practice, during which three men were wounded, and one died of a heart attack. The 14th Illinois once attempted target practice with a barrel set up 180 yards from the firing line, but of 160 shots fired only four actually hit it. A South Carolina officer estimated that only one in every 400 shots fired resulted in a hit. A lack of training contributed not only to poor accuracy but to mishandling which could render the rifle useless. At the Battle of Gettysburg, the Union Army salvaged 24,000 rifles which were still loaded and found 18,000 of them had been loaded twice or more without being fired.

Breechloading and repeating rifles promised significant improvements over muzzleloading rifles, particularly repeaters as they allowed a far greater rate of fire than was possible with single-shot rifles. There were nevertheless drawbacks to these weapons, as early breechloaders leaked gas at the breech and repeaters were technically complex and required metallic cartridges which could be unreliable. Cost was also an issue: in an era where a soldier earned $10–13 a month and a rifled musket might cost $10–20 to manufacture, a repeating rifle might cost $37–65 to manufacture. Making the ammunition was also expensive, as each metallic cartridge could cost $2. Nevertheless, the Federal government did eventually purchase thousands of these weapons, and thousands more were purchased by Union soldiers using their own money. The Confederates made attempts to acquire these weapons, but they lacked the technological ability to reproduce them or their ammunition.

When the American Civil War broke out in April 1861, neither the North (about 360,000 small arms) nor the South (about 240,000) had enough weapons to fight a major war. Stockpiles of rifles and handguns carried by individual soldiers were limited. As the war escalated, those arms stockpiles were quickly diminished. To combat the arms shortage, the Union and Confederacy both imported large quantities of rifles from Europe, with each side buying whatever it could get. The relatively poor South had bought only 50,000 by August 1862, while the North bought 726,000. Accordingly, during the first two years of the war, soldiers from both sides used a wide variety of rifles, including many that were over 50 years old and were considered obsolete. At the same time, Northern rifle and gun manufacturers such as Sharps, Colt, Remington, and the Springfield Armory quickly increased their production of rifles; Springfield alone increased its annual output from 20,000 to 200,000. The North was thus able to supply its own small arms needs, while the South had to continue to rely on foreign sources, eventually purchasing 580,000 rifles. A number of Tryon contract conversions from flintlock muskets were originally produced in the 1840s and were still issued to troops in the early years of the Civil War, such as Texas regiment and South Carolina Militia.

== Modified ammunition types ==
An alternative type of rifle ammunition which saw use during the Civil War was the exploding bullet. One of the few standard-issue exploding bullets was designed by Samuel Gardiner Jr. for the Union Army. These Gardiner rounds were similar to the Minié ball but filled with fulminate and a time fuse set to detonate one to three seconds after firing. Their primary use was anti-materiel such as setting fire to vehicles and ammunition, since their fragmentary properties were deemed at best to cause unnecessarily cruel wounds. After initial testing in the fall of 1862, the Union ordered 100,000 of these bullets and issued them to units in the field (such as the 2nd New Hampshire), although by the end of the war, 75,000 rounds were still in storage. The Confederates attempted to claim the moral high ground by arguing they never stooped to using exploding bullets, however the Richmond Arsenal manufactured at least 100,000 exploding bullets and examples of Confederates using exploding bullets can be found during the Battle of Glendale and the Siege of Vicksburg.

One ammunition type which could be mistaken for an exploding bullet was the Williams cleaner bullet. Such bullets were included in each packet of regular ammunition and designed to clear any residue out of the barrel when fired. When in flight, however, the cleaning components gave the impression of being exploding bullets. Due to complaints that they damaged the barrels of the rifle, the US Army discontinued their use in September 1864.

The use of more exotic types of ammunition during the Civil War is harder to confirm. According to US Army records, up to 200,000 fragmentation bullets were ordered from Ira W. Shaler, although there is no evidence they were actually issued to troops. Both sides accused the other of using poisoned bullets, and while neither government authorized their use and manufacture, it is possible that individuals modified their bullets in this way.

== List of rifles ==
=== Springfield Rifle ===
The Springfield Model 1861 was considered the standard rifle musket of the Civil War. Like other Springfield rifles, it was first produced at the Springfield Armory, but to meet war demands, twenty arms manufacturers were contracted to increase production. At 56 inches long and weighing nine pounds, the Model 1861 was a single-shot, muzzleloading rifle that used the percussion cap mechanism to fire a .58 caliber Minié ball. It was capable of firing three rounds a minute at an effective range of 500 yards but could be deadly at longer ranges. A rugged design that was simple to construct, the Model 1861 and its derivatives (including the Springfield Model 1863) were the most common rifles in the war, with Northern arsenals producing over a million examples.

The Springfield Model 1855 was the first standard-issue rifle for the US Army to fire the Minié ball, with 60,000 having been built from 1856 to 1860 at both the Springfield and Harpers Ferry Armory. These used the less reliable Maynard tape primer firing mechanism which when damp, could cause misfires, a flaw that had forced its original retirement in 1860 until it was re-introduced to meet the arms shortage. When Confederate forces seized the manufacturing equipment from Harpers Ferry, they used it to continue production of the Model 1855 during the war. Depending on the location where they were manufactured, these were known as Richmond or Fayetteville rifles.

Many older Springfield muskets, such as the Springfield Model 1842, which had been converted into rifles, were also brought out of storage due to the arms shortage. However, these old and obsolete weapons were replaced by newer weapons as they became available.

=== Enfield Rifle ===
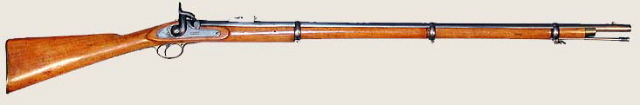
A British 1853 Enfield rifle musket

The second-most widely used rifle of the Civil War, and the weapon most widely used by the Confederates, was the British Pattern 1853 Enfield. The standard weapon of the British Army between 1853 and 1867, like the Springfield, the Enfield was a single-shot, muzzleloading rifle musket. Although it had a .577 caliber bore, it could use the same .58 caliber Minié ball as the Springfield. Approximately 900,000 Enfield rifles were imported by both the North and South during the Civil War, and it was considered the best of the foreign-sourced rifles. The rifle produced domestically in Texas.

Some soldiers considered the Enfield to be superior to the Springfield in terms of quality and accuracy. At 500 yards, a trained shooter could hit a man-sized target about half the time. However, many officers preferred the machine-made Springfield musket over the handcrafted Enfield thanks to the interchangeability of their parts. At Gettysburg, Colonel Joshua Chamberlain ordered any man who still carried an Enfield to replace it with a Springfield salvaged from the battlefield.

=== Lorenz Rifle ===
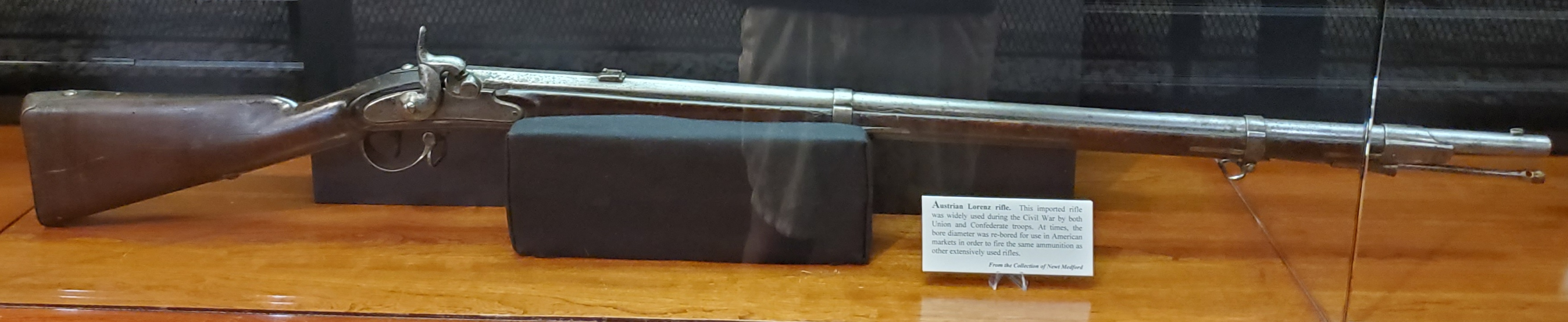
An Austrian Lorenz rifle

The third-most widely used rifle of the Civil War, and the most prolific of "second-class" weapons, was the Lorenz Rifle. Introduced in 1854 for the Austrian armed forces, the North imported 226,924 Lorenz rifles during the war while the South imported at least 100,000. Similar in design to the Enfield rifle, early Lorenz rifles were considered superb weapons right out of the factory, but they had a .54 caliber bore, which could not accept the same bullets as the Springfield and Enfield. The rounds fired by the Lorenz were considered inferior to the .58 caliber Minié ball, and while the rifle could be rebored to accept a larger bullet, the process could affect barrel quality. Later in the war, even factory-direct Lorenz rifles tended to be of poor craftsmanship. Despite their extensive use by both sides in the war, soldiers' opinions on the rifle were decidedly negative. General Joseph O. Shelby transported 2,500 Tyler rifles with him during his withdrawal into Mexico.

=== Other rifles ===
- Sharps rifle: The Sharps rifles were a series of single-shot, breech loading rifles made famous for their use by Hiram Berdan's 1st and 2nd U.S. Sharpshooters regiments. Utilizing a unique pelleted primer mechanism and paper cartridges, the Sharps could fire a .52 caliber bullet three times faster than a muzzleloading rifle. A shorter, lighter carbine version was suitable for use by cavalry force. The Union purchased 10,000 Sharps rifles and 80,000 carbines, with many more bought by state governments or soldiers themselves.
- Spencer rifle: The most widely used breech loading weapon of the Civil War, the Spencer was a .52 caliber repeating rifle with a spring-fed tubular magazine for seven metallic cartridges in the stock. Although loading the magazine could take time, this was sped up with the introduction of a quick-loading cartridge box, and thanks to its lever action, the Spencer could achieve a rate of fire of 21 rounds per minute. Both a standard and carbine version of the Spencer were created, of which the federal government purchased 12,000 and 94,000, respectively, with many more bought by states and individuals.
- Henry rifle: The Henry repeating rifle was similar to the Spencer rifle in that it used a lever action. But had its magazine in a tube below the barrel. It fired a smaller .44 caliber rimfire bullet, and the magazine could hold fifteen cartridges. While the Spencer was more mechanically reliable, the Henry had a greater rate of fire, which, with its larger magazine, put it in high demand among Civil War soldiers. Only 1,731 Henry rifles were bought by the federal government, with thousands more bought by states and private individuals. Despite its rarity, the rifle made a large impression on Confederate soldiers who complained that it could "load up on Sunday and shoot all the rest of the week."
- Colt Revolver Rifle: The first repeating rifles to be purchased by the US government, these were a series of revolver rifles which used a rotating multi-chamber cylinder loaded with cartridges. They were available in several sizes and calibers, and most had a cylinder that could hold six rounds. Unfortunately, a common problem was the accidental discharge of all six chambers, causing serious injury to the firer.
- Whitworth rifle: Considered the world's first sniper rifle when used with a telescopic sight, the Whitworth was a British single-shot, muzzleloading rifle purchased by the Confederate government in limited numbers. Firing a mechanically fitted, six-sided bullet from a hexagonal bore, the Whitworth was capable of incredible accuracy at long range. Only the best marksmen were given Whitworth rifles, forming the famed Whitworth Sharpshooters unit.
- M1841 Mississippi rifle: A predecessor of the Springfield rifle, the Mississippi rifle was a single-shot, muzzleloading rifle produced at the Harpers Ferry Armory until 1855, although a number of private contractors continued to produce examples through 1862. Both sides equipped their soldiers with Mississippi rifles early in the war due to arms shortages. By 1863, the rifle had ceased service with Union forces, although the Confederates would continue to use it through the end of the war.
- Brunswick rifle: The Brunswick was a British single-shot, muzzleloading rifle that fired mechanically fitted bullets to achieve accuracy. The barrel had two deep spiral grooves to impart a spin on a belted ball, whose odd shape unfortunately made it erratic in flight. A number were purchased by the Confederate government in its search to equip its newly formed army, however these rifles were quickly relegated to militia units as better rifles became available.

Long gun Categorization
Rifles - First Class	Breech-Loading Carbines	Muzzle-Loading Carbines
Springfield muskets (hand-written onto form)	Ballard's rifled. Cal. .44 (takes metallic cartridge)	English Artillery rifled. Calibre
U.S. Rifles, Model 1855, Calibre .58	Burnside's rifled. Cal. .50	English Sapper rifled, "Enfield" pattern. Calibre .577
U.S. Rifles, Model 18xx, Calibre .54	Spencer's Cal. .52 (hand-written onto form)	French Rifled Carbines. Calibre .60
Ballard's Breech-loading Rifles, Calibre .5x	Cosmopolitan, rifled. Calibre .52 and Gwyn and Campbell carbine	Pistol Carbine, rifled.
Colt's Revolving Rifles, Cal. .56	Joslyn's rifled. Calibre .52	Musketoons, U.S. XXXX rifled.
Merrill's Breech-loading Rifles, Calibre .52	Gallager's rifled. Calibre .50	Musketoons, English, smooth-bore.
Spencer Breech-loading Rifles, Calibre unspecified	Gibbs' rifled. Calibre .52	
Sharps' Breech-loading Rifles, Calibre .52	Green's rifled. Calibre .54	
Prussian Muskets (hand-written onto form)	Hall's rifled, Calibre .52	
Austrian Muskets (hand-written onto form)	Lindner's. Calibre .58	
Enfield Rifles, Calibre .577	Merrill's rifled. Calibre .54	
Light French Rifles, Calibre .57	Maynard's rifled. Calibre .50	
Hawken rifles	Sharps' rifled. Calibre .52	
Allen Falling Block rifle .44	Smith's rifled. Calibre .50	
	Starr's rifled. Calibre .54	
	Warner Carbine Calibre .56	
	Triplett & Scott carbine Calibre .56	
	Ball repeating carbine Calibre .50	
	Remington split breech Calibre .50	
	Lee carbine Calibre .50	
	Henry rifle Calibre .44	
	Various revolving rifles	
	Various stocked revolvers	
	Tarpley carbine	
	Morse carbine Calibre .54	
	Keene carbine Calibre .54	

== Gallery ==
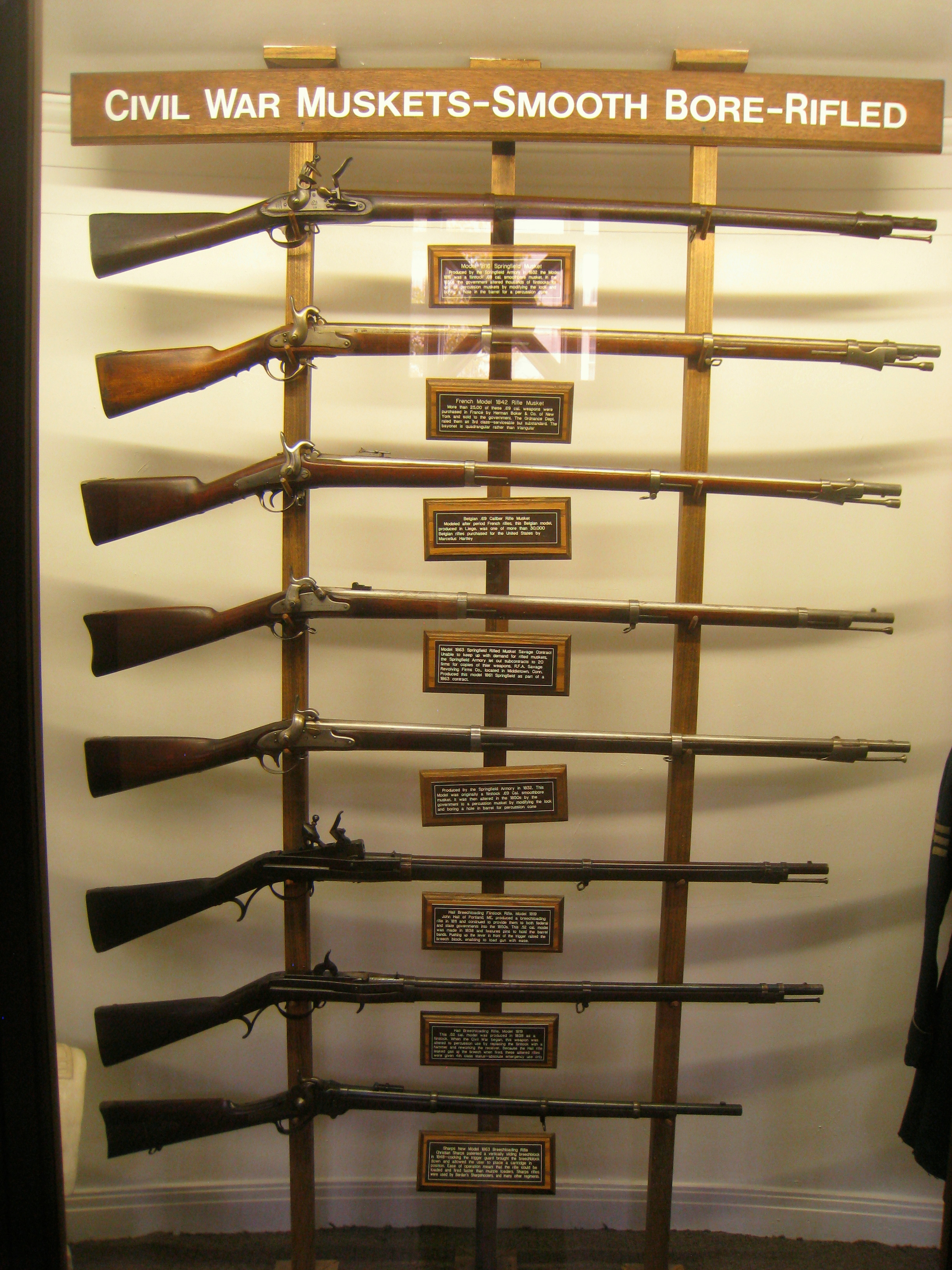
This collection contain smoothbore flintlocks converted into percussion muskets, some with their barrels rifled

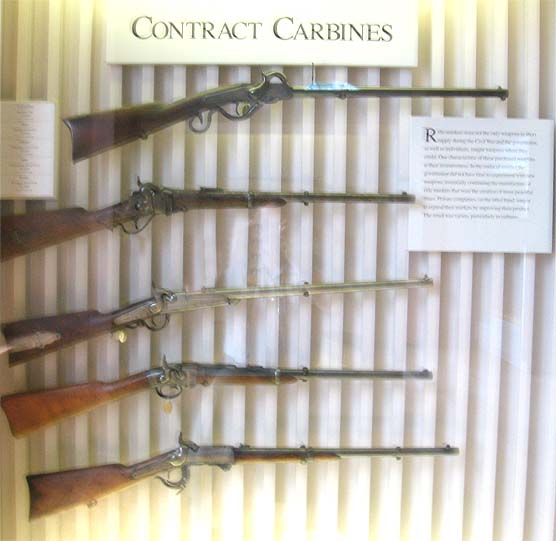
Contract carbines as they were known at that time: Cosmopolitan, Sharps, Gallager, Smith and Burnside

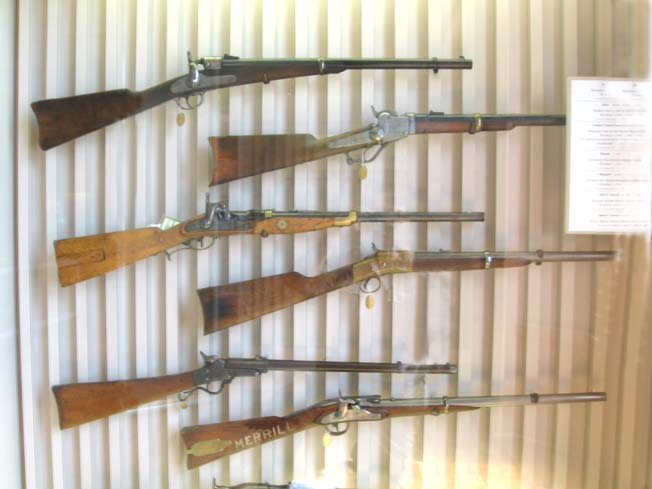
Joslyn, Starr, Lindner, Warner, Maynard and Merrill carbines

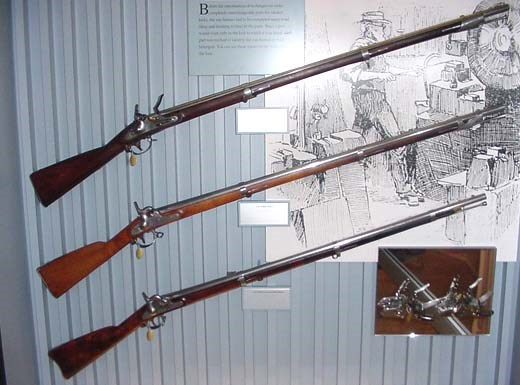
Model 1816, Model 1842 and Model 1855 muskets

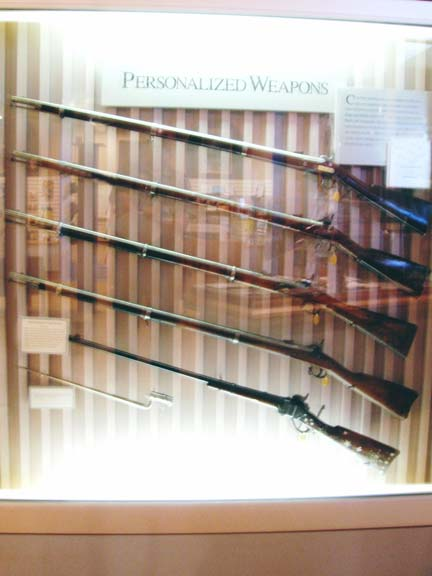
Confederate Richmond musket (top) along with U.S. Model 1861, British Pattern 1853 Enfield, U.S. Model 1861 muskets and Sharps rifle

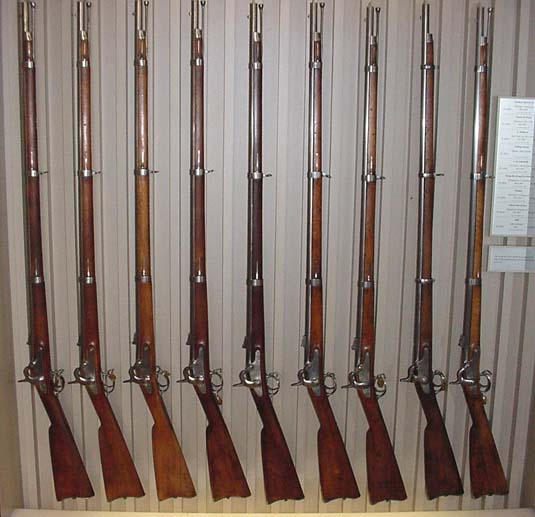
Here is a number of Springfield Model 1861 contract rifles produced elsewhere except Springfield
