= Burnside carbine =

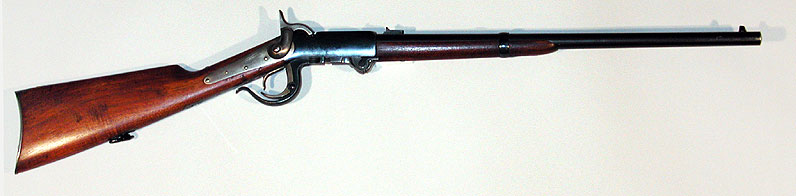
- Burnside carbine
- Type: Carbine
- Place of origin: United States

Service history
- Used by: United States; Confederate States; Fenian Brotherhood; Mexico
- Wars: American Civil War; Second French intervention in Mexico

Production history
- Designer: Ambrose Burnside
- Designed: 1855
- Manufacturer: Bristol Firearms Company and Burnside Rifle Company
- Unit cost: $38.50 apiece with appendages (1861)
- Produced: 1858–1870
- No. built: ~100,000

Specifications
- Mass: 7 lb (3.2 kg)
- Length: 39.5 inches (1,000 mm)
- Barrel length: 21 inches (530 mm)
- Cartridge: .54 Burnside
- Caliber: .54 inches (14 mm)
- Action: Lever action
- Muzzle velocity: 950 ft/s (290 m/s)
- Effective firing range: 200 yd (180 m)
- Feed system: Single-shot

The Burnside carbine was a breech-loading carbine that saw widespread use during the American Civil War.

== Design ==
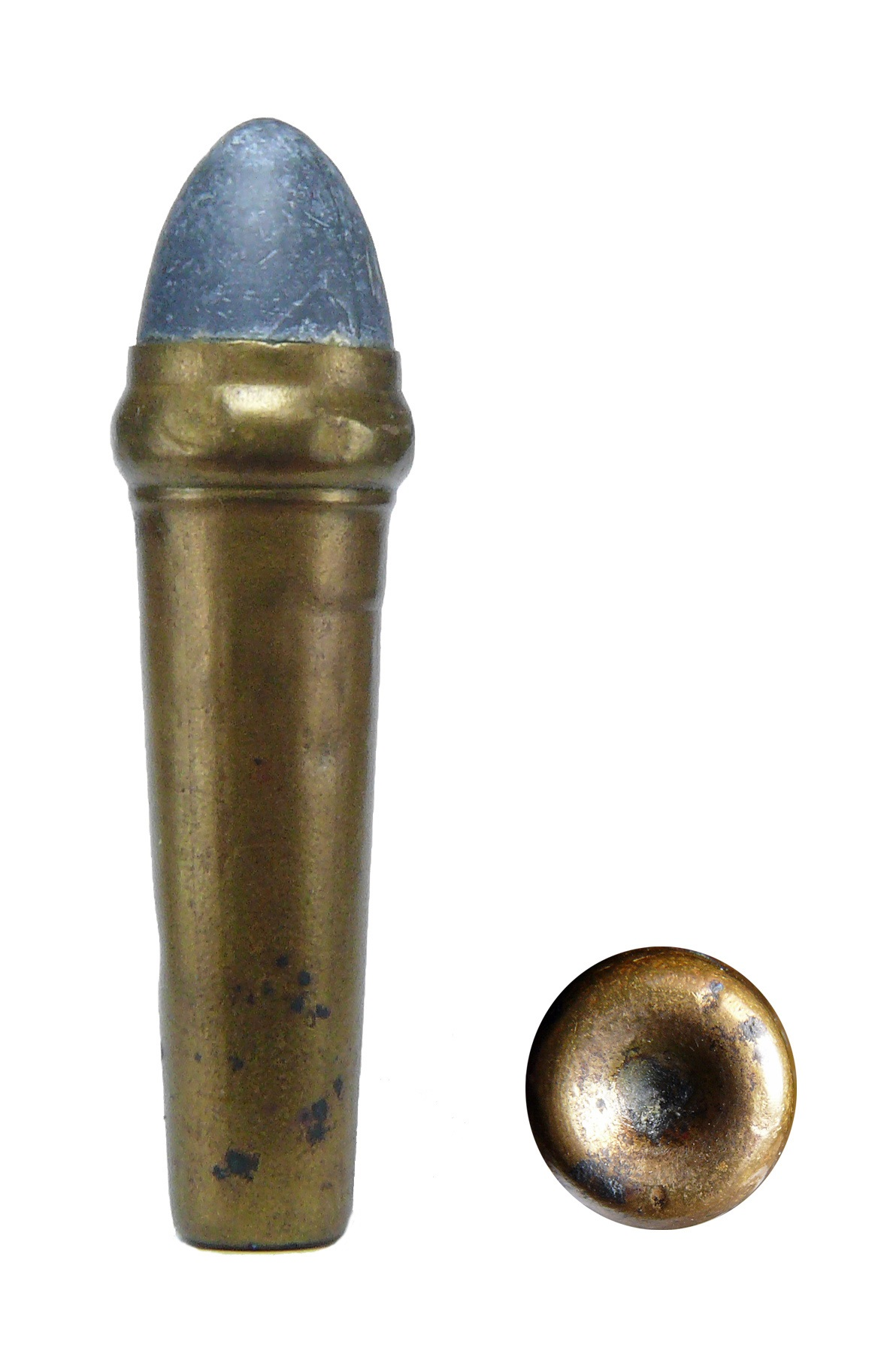
The rather peculiar reverse chambered Burnside cartridge.

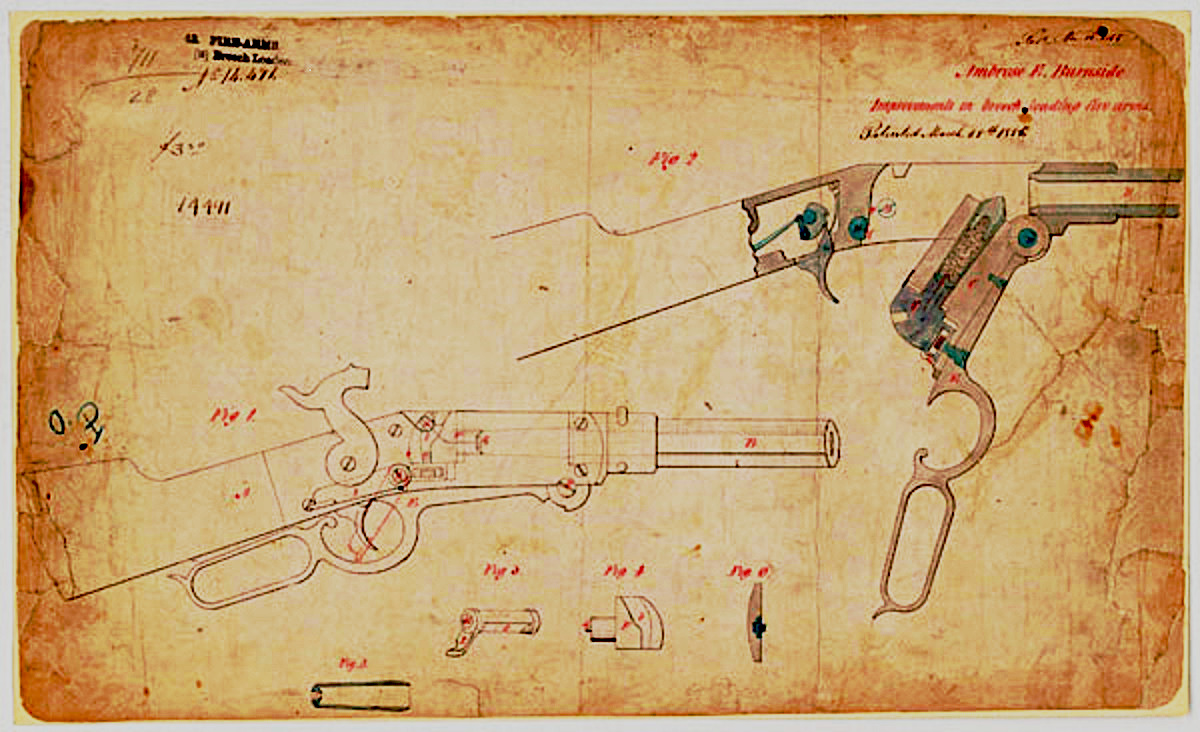
Burnside-Patent

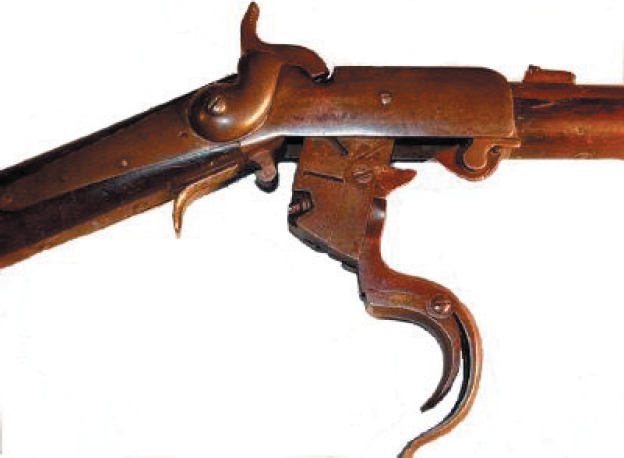
Burnside carbine in loading position

The carbine was designed and patented by Ambrose Burnside, who resigned his commission in the U.S. Army to devote himself full-time to working on the weapon. The carbine used a special reverse-chambered brass cartridge, which was also invented by Burnside. This cartridge contained a bullet and powder, but no primer; Burnside considered primed cartridges a safety risk. Pressing the weapon's two trigger guards opened the breech block and allowed the user to insert a cartridge.

When the trigger was pulled, the hammer struck a separate percussion cap and caused a spark; a hole in the base of the cartridge exposed the black powder to this spark. The unique, conical cartridge sealed the joint between the barrel and the breech. Most other breech-loading weapons of the day tended to leak hot gas when fired, but Burnside's design eliminated this problem.

== Service history ==
In 1857, the Burnside carbine won a competition at West Point against 17 other carbine designs. Despite this, few of the carbines were immediately ordered by the government, but this changed with the outbreak of the Civil War, when over 55,000 were ordered for use by Union cavalrymen. This made it the third most popular carbine of the Civil War; only the Sharps carbine and the Spencer carbine were more widely used. They saw action in all theatres of the war. There were so many in service that many were captured and second widely used by the Confederates. A common complaint by users was that the unusually shaped cartridge sometimes became stuck in the breech after firing.

Based on ordnance returns and ammunition requisitions, it has been estimated that 43 Union cavalry regiments were using the Burnside carbine during the 1863-1864 period. Troopers of the 1st Rhode Island Cavalry, 1st Maine Cavalry, and 3rd Indiana Cavalry, among others, used it in important battles including Antietam, Gettysburg, and Chickamauga. Additionally, 7 Confederate cavalry units were at least partially armed with the weapon during this same period. Specific other Confederate units to have used captured Burnsides include the 19th Mississippi; the 3rd, 6th, 9th, and 27th Texas; and the 9th Tennessee Cavalry. Following the 1865 engagement with Mosby’s forces near Winchester, three officers and seventy-eight enlisted personnel were reported captured, and Mosby successfully augmented his inventory of Burnside carbines.

Five different models were produced. Production was discontinued towards the end of the Civil War, when the Burnside Rifle Company was given a contract to make Spencer carbines instead. Burnside co. later producing weapons contract for pro-Imperial and pro-Shogunate forces. Irish revolutionaries and Mexican cavalry used the carbine.

== Effect of the carbine on Burnside's career ==
During the American Civil War Burnside, though his military record was mixed, rose through the ranks partly because his carbine was so well known. He was pressured by President Lincoln several times to take command of the Union Army of the Potomac. He repeatedly declined, saying, "I was not competent to command such a large army as this." When he eventually did accept command, he led the Army of the Potomac to defeat at the Battle of Fredericksburg. The battle and the subsequent abortive offensive left Burnside's "officers complaining loudly to the White House and the War Department about his incompetence." He also performed poorly at the Battle of Spotsylvania Court House, and a court of inquiry blamed him for the Union failure at the Battle of the Crater, though the blame was later lifted from him.

== See also ==
- List of carbines
- Rifles in the American Civil War
- Rikhter R-23, a later firearm with similar reverse chambering
