= Joslyn rifle =

Joslyn Rifle
- Type: Breechloading Service rifle
- Place of origin: United States

Service history
- Used by: United States; Confederate States; Argentina
- Wars: American Civil War; Franco-Prussian War; Argentinian Civil War

Production history
- Manufacturer: Joslyn Firearms Company
- Produced: 1855–1865
- Variants: M1855, M1861, M1862, M1864, M1865, rifle and carbine

Specifications
- Caliber: .54 or .58
- Action: Breech-loaded

The term Joslyn Rifle refers to a series of rifles produced in the mid-19th century. The term is often used to refer specifically to the Joslyn Model 1861/1862, which was the first mass-produced breech-loading rifle produced at the Springfield Armory.

Joslyn carbine also known as the Monkey Tail.

== History ==
Benjamin Franklin Joslyn was known as one of the most interesting gun designers during the U.S. Civil War, but he was known more for his constant clashes with sub-contractors and the Federal Government than he was for the quality of his arms. His disputes with the government lasted long after the Civil War had ended.

In 1855, Joslyn designed a breech-loading carbine. After successful tests, the U.S. Army ordered 50 of these rifles in 1857 in .54 caliber. The Army quickly lost interest in the rifle, but in 1858 the U.S. Navy ordered 500 of these in .58 caliber. Production problems resulted in only 150 to 200 of these rifles being delivered in 1861.

In 1861, Joslyn designed a modified version using a metal rimfire cartridge. The Federal Ordnance Department ordered 860 of these carbines, which were delivered in 1862. Most went to units from Ohio. In 1862, Joslyn received an order for 20,000 carbines. Delivery on these weapons started in 1863, but by the time the Civil War came to an end only about half of these had been delivered.

The number of carbines used by Confederate forces remains unknown. Morgan's Raiders captured five hundred of these weapons.

In 1865, Joslyn submitted two carbine designs for trial, both based on the Model 1864 carbine. Despite the difficulties between Joslyn and the U.S. Government, an order was placed for 5,000 of these weapons. Springfield Armory produced approximately 3,000 Joslyn rifles before hostilities ended.

In 1865 the Argentine Armed Forces acquired a small amount of M1855 and M1864 carbines; those were trialed and used by the cavalry against the natives. They remained in use until 1870 being issued to the Buenos Aires militia.

After the war ended, the U.S. Government canceled all remaining contracts, claiming that the rifles failed to meet specifications. Litigation related to these contracts persisted for many years after the war ended.

In 1871, 6,600 carbines as well as 1,600 rifles that had been converted to use the .50-70 Government centerfire cartridge were sold to France for use in the Franco-Prussian War. Many of these were seized by Germany, sold to Belgium and ultimately were converted to shotguns and shipped to Africa.

== Design and features ==
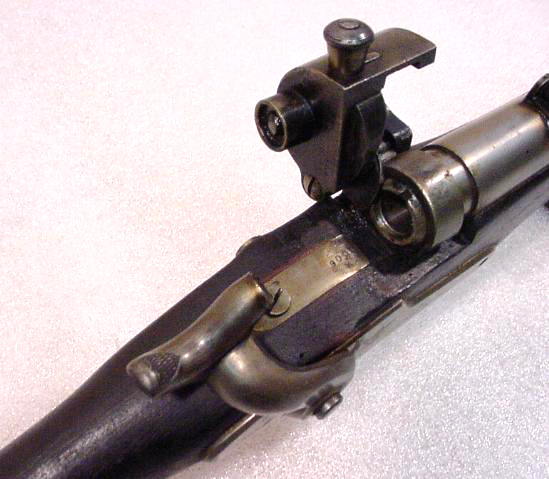
Close-up view of a Joslyn rifle

The Model 1855 used combustible paper cartridges which were ignited by percussion caps. The breech was opened by means of a lever with an attached finger ring that ran along the wrist of the stock. The rifle version had a 30-inch (760 mm) barrel and an overall length of 45 inches (1,100 mm). The carbine version had a 22-inch (560 mm) barrel and an overall length of 38 inches (970 mm). The carbines purchased by the U.S. Army were .54 caliber, and the carbines purchased by the U.S. Navy were .58 caliber. A sword-type bayonet could be attached to the barrel.

The Model 1861 used metal rimfire cartridges and had a laterally hinged block called the "cap" which enveloped the standing breech and could be swung open to the left when the locking catch was released. This design was refined in 1862 with the addition of cam surfaces which improved the cartridge seating and extraction. The Model 1861 was chambered for the .56-56 Spencer rimfire cartridge, and the improved Model 1862 used the .56-52 Spencer rimfire cartridge. The barrels were not designed to accept a bayonet.

The Model 1864 featured many small improvements and refinements to the Model 1862 design, and could fire either the .56-52 Spencer rimfire cartridge or a proprietary .54 caliber rimfire cartridge made by Joslyn.

The Model 1865 produced at Springfield Armory was based on the Springfield Model 1863 rifle musket, except that it used the Joslyn firing action instead of the Springfield 1863's muzzle-loading caplock system.

== See also ==
- Rifles in the American Civil War
