= Territorial defense (Russia) =

- Территориальная оборона
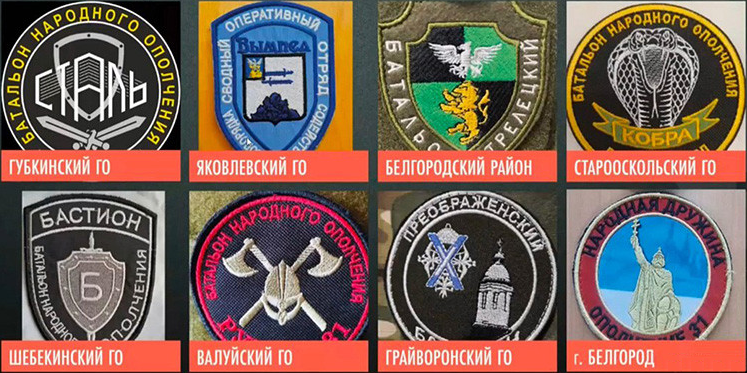
- Emblems of territorial defense units in Belgorod Oblast
- Founded: 2022; 4 years ago
- Country: Russia
- Branch: Russian Armed Forces
- Type: Military reserve force
- Role: Light infantry Home guard
- Part of: Ministry of Defense of Russia
- Website: https://mchs.gov.ru/ministerstvo/o-ministerstve/terminy-mchs-rossii/term/1774

Territorial defense (Russian: Территориальная оборона) in Russia is a set of measures, as well as detachments, organized in wartime by territorial authorities to combat sabotage and reconnaissance groups and landings, as well as to protect important facilities and homeland defense in the territory where martial law is in effect.

== History ==
The Belgorod Oblast and other border regions regularly came under fire after the start of the full-scale Russian invasion of Ukraine. After the Ukrainian counteroffensive, shelling of border areas of the Belgorod Oblast became much more frequent. The Russian Volunteer Corps, fighting on the side of Ukraine, carried out raids several times and took control of border settlements for some time.

Since December 2022, the formation of the "Patriot" voluntary people's militia has been announced in the Kursk Oblast. From the posts of the governor on his Telegram channel, it followed that such militias in the districts guard the border strip. In addition, they created fire brigades in the areas under fire. The head of the "People's Territorial Defense of Voronezh" said that the volunteers do not have a legal entity, only a charter, and that the association exists through voluntary donations. This initiative does not apply to the regional territorial defense, which includes employees of law enforcement agencies. The authorities of the Oryol Oblast, which does not border Ukraine, decided to create their own territorial defense units in July 2023. In July 2023, governor of Pskov Oblast, Mikhail Vedernikov created a unit called "Alexander Nevsky's Squad". Territorial defense units were most actively formed in the Belgorod Oblast. Governor Vyacheslav Gladkov spoke about this in December 2022, but according to commanders, territorial defense appeared earlier - at the beginning of the war. By July 2023, the authorities had created eight battalions, which consist of almost 3 thousand people. The units are formed from those unfit for service - due to age or health - but with combat experience. These volunteers have the status of "public figures" - they are entitled to certificates. They are engaged in patrolling and guarding facilities, which resulted in incidents with the detention of visiting journalists.

== Legal status ==
According to Law No. 61 of 31.05.1996 "On Defense", territorial defense is created on the territory of the Russian Federation or in its individual areas, during the period of martial law, which is declared by presidential decree. The decree on the introduction of a "medium response level" for border regions, within the framework of which authorities can make such a decision, was signed on October 19, 2022. Also, regional authorities adopt their own regulations on territorial defense based on the non-public Regulation from the presidential decree of July 1, 2014 N 482 "On approval of the Regulation on the territorial defense of the Russian Federation" (Article 22, paragraph 3 of the Law "On Defense").

With the adoption of amendments to the law on military service in July 2023, the heads of individual regions will be able to create their own military companies and arm them. These companies can be engaged in border protection: fighting armed formations and destroying drones. These enterprises can be provided with weapons and ammunition. They will be financed from the federal and regional budgets. Earlier, the heads of border regions proposed to enshrine in legislation the possibility of issuing combat weapons to participants in territorial defense.

== Armament ==
The territorial defense units have the status of formations close to people's militias, and therefore initially could not be armed. The law provided for them only civilian and hunting weapons.

On August 2, 2023, participants in the territorial defense of the Belgorod and Kursk oblasts began to be issued civilian Saiga-MK carbines based on the AK-74 and anti-drone guns. The governor of the Belgorod Oblast reported that each of the eight territorial defense units of the region was equipped with five SUVs, digital car radios and quadcopters. The Kremlin stated that weapons were being issued to the territorial defense units in accordance with the law and in connection with the situation in the Belgorod Oblast.

The Saiga-MK carbines do not have a burst-fire function; when the buttstock is folded, the ability to fire is blocked. Sometimes they are equipped with 30-round magazines with bullet cartridges — the law allows such modifications for sporting weapons. Also, some carbines were additionally modified with collimator and optical sights, that is, they were made closer to combat weapons. However, it is difficult to withstand sabotage groups with such weapons. Reconnaissance and sabotage groups are often armed to the highest standard, including Western automatic weapons, they can also have, for example, underbarrel and automatic grenade launchers and drones. In addition, carbines were assigned only to the "most experienced fighters" of the squads.
