= Starr carbine =

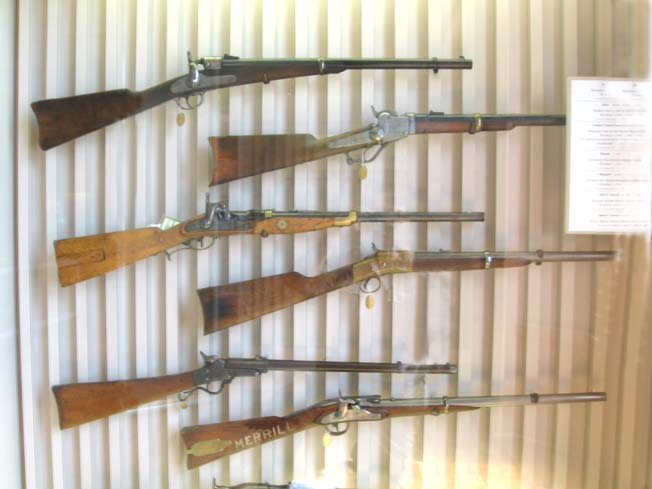
- Starr carbine at the Springfield Armory National Historic Site
- Type: Carbine
- Place of origin: United States

Service history
- Used by: United States, Confederate States, Japan, Canada, Bunyoro
- Wars: American Civil War, Boshin War, American Indian Wars, Fenian incursions

Production history
- Designer: Ebenezer Starr
- Designed: 1858
- Manufacturer: Starr Arms Company
- Produced: 1858–1867
- No. built: ~35,000

Specifications
- Length: 37.5 in (950 mm)
- Barrel length: 21 in (530 mm)
- Caliber: .54 in (14 mm)
- Action: Falling-block

The Starr carbine was a breechloading single-shot rifle used by the United States Army. Designed in 1858, the Starr was primarily used by cavalry soldiers in the American Civil War.

== History ==
In January 1858, Ebenzer Starr submitted his design for a single-shot, breech-loading rifle to the Washington Armory for evaluation. During testing, the rifle was noted to have no misfires, and its accuracy was considered better than average. Testers commented that if the gas seal could be improved, the weapon would be better than its rival, the Sharps carbine.

The rifle was adopted as the Model 1858 carbine and produced by the Starr Arms Company of Yonkers, New York. The Model 1858 was designed to fire paper or linen cartridges. 25,603 Starr carbines were purchased by the US Army Ordnance Department between 1 January 1861 and 30 June 1866. In 1865, the government ordered 3,000 Starr carbines chambered to use metal cartridge. These proved to be successful, and an additional 2,000 were ordered.

Although the Starr carbine had proven to be effective during the Civil War, it was not successful during the trials of 1865 by the U.S. Army trials board, and no further rifles were ordered.

During the war, the Starr Arms Company had been the fifth largest supplier of carbines and the third largest supplier of .44 caliber single action pistols. After the war had ended, and with no further government contracts, Starr could no longer compete with larger manufacturers like Winchester, Sharps, and Colt, and the company closed its doors in 1867. A number of additional carbines ended up in Confederate hands during fighting around Petersburg, October 1863. This predates the famous Siege of Petersburg and refers to earlier skirmishes in the area. Another Confederate acquire Starr carbines after skirmishing at Snickerville. Large quantities of Starr Carbines were designated as surplus and liquidated at reduced prices to both domestic and international markets. However, the transition of the U.S. military to metallic cartridge platforms, such as the Springfield Trapdoor series, rendered the Starr Carbine rapidly obsolete.

While the Starr Carbine did achieve significant some popularity in Japan, it was widely regarded as a high-quality firearm among Samurai commanders and soldiers.

228 of these breech-loading carbines were issued to the Canadian Militia (with 200 to the Director of Stores in Ottawa and 28 to the Militia Storekeeper in Kingston); although purchased by the War Department in the United States in response to the Fenian Raids of 1866, they were loaned to Canadian units.

== Design and features ==
The Starr carbine was similar in design to the Sharps carbine. The Starr had a longer receiver and a distinctive web between the tail of the breech lever and the underside of the butt.

The Starr carbine had a .54 caliber barrel that was 21 inches in length. The weapon had an overall length of 37.65 inches and a weight of 7.4 lbs. A bayonet could not be fitted.

The Starr carbine had a three-position rear sight composed of a standing block and two folding leaves.

The Starr carbine fired paper or linen cartridges that were ignited by conventional percussion caps. The weapon fired reliably as long as the lengthy flash channel was kept clean.

== Variants ==
The Starr carbine was produced in two versions, the Model 1858 and the Model 1865. The Model 1858 could fire linen or paper cartridges made by Starr, and could also fire similar cartridges made for the Sharps carbine. The Model 1865 version fired the metal 56-50 Spencer rimfire cartridge, and as a result, had a significantly redesigned hammer and breech block.

== See also ==
- Rifles in the American Civil War
