= Wachdienst =

Neighbourhood watch organisation in the Third Reich

The Wachdienst (English: watch service) was a rural home guard organisation raised by the Third Reich in Germany during the last months of World War II, in 1945. The service was created to assist local authorities in rural areas, among other things, and elderly men in Germany, mostly farmers and other rural labourers, were forced into conscription. Members of the Wachdienst were often required to participate in local fire brigades and engage in related tasks. Others were involved in the oversight of farms in their area, and were required to look into pests affecting local crops and produce. In addition to this, and as the name of the unit implies, the Wachdienst were also tasked with home protection for civilians, and undertook militia-like duties in that respect.

The service was one of many civilian organisations created under command of the Third Reich in Germany, in response to an increasing lack of manpower and supplies as the war dragged on and continued its demand for resources, human and not. As the Wehrmacht, the German military forces, were proving ineffective in stopping the advance of the Soviet Union on the Eastern Front due to a lack of units, Adolf Hitler sanctioned the creation of such organisations on the home front, and civilians who were working in areas perceived to be non-essential were often enrolled.

The Wachdienst should not be confused with the Volkssturm, a similar militia "home guard" unit formed in October 1944, whose name is roughly translated into English as "The People's Army".
