= Triplett & Scott carbine =

Triplett & Scott Carbine
- Type: Carbine
- Place of origin: United States

Service history
- In service: 1864–1865
- Used by: Kentucky Home Guard
- Wars: American Civil War

Production history
- Designer: Louis Triplett; William Scott
- Designed: 1864
- Produced: 1864–1865
- No. built: c. 5,000
- Variants: Short version, Long version

Specifications
- Mass: Long version: 9 lb (4.1 kg); Short version 8 lb 6 oz (3.8 kg)
- Length: Long version: 48 in (1,200 mm); Short version 40 in (1,000 mm)
- Barrel length: Long version: 30 in (760 mm); Short version 22 in (560 mm)
- Cartridge: .56-50 Spencer
- Action: Lever-action
- Muzzle velocity: 1,025 ft/s (312 m/s)
- Feed system: 7 bullets, tube magazine

Triplett & Scott was an American repeater carbine invented by Louis Triplett and William Scott of Columbia, Kentucky. It was issued to Kentucky Home Guard troops who were assigned to protect the supply lines of the Union Army under General Sherman's command.

== See also ==
- Rifles in the American Civil War
