= Landwehr =

German national militias in the nineteenth and early twentieth-centuries

Landwehr (German pronunciation: [ˈlantˌveːɐ]), or Landeswehr, is a German language term used in referring to certain national armies, or militias found in nineteenth- and early twentieth-century Europe. In different context it refers to large-scale, low-strength fortifications. In German, the word means "defence of the country"; but the term as applied to an insurrectional militia is very ancient, and lantveri are mentioned in Baluzii Capitularia, as quoted in Henry Hallam's Middle Ages, i. 262, 10th edition.

== Austria-Hungary ==
=== Austrian Landwehr ===
The Austrian Landwehr was one of three components that made up the ground forces of the Austro-Hungarian Empire between 1868 and 1918, and it was composed of recruits from the Cisleithanian parts of the empire. Intended as a national defence force alongside the Royal Hungarian Landwehr (or Honvéd), the Landwehr was officially established by order of Emperor Franz Joseph I on 5 December 1868. Yet while the Hungarian force was generously supported early on by the parliament in Budapest, legislators in Vienna generally failed to advance the cause of the Landwehr, leaving it by the 1870s as a skeletal force with only the appearance of parity. In 1887, Archduke Albert wrote that Landwehr units were not ready, in terms of training or discipline, for use in the first two weeks of a war. Yet the 1880s saw an expansion in the force's numbers, as the high command was unable to obtain increases in manpower for the joint Imperial and Royal Army and sought to increase overall numbers through the Landwehr. Additionally, Austrian fears of the development of the Honvéd caused the Austrian Reichsrat to vote to increase the Landwehr's strength to 135,000. These nationalist interests led to a gradual strengthening and improvement of the force, so that by the start of the First World War, Landwehr units were considered equal to the units of the joint army in readiness and equipment. Additionally, in Tyrol and Carinthia, three units of the Landwehr were specially trained and equipped for mountain warfare.

The Austrian Landwehr and other components of the Austro-Hungarian Army were all full-time standing armies.

=== Hungarian Landwehr ===
The Royal Hungarian Landwehr (German: königlich ungarische Landwehr, Hungarian: Magyar Királyi Honvédség, colloquially called the Honvéd) or Royal Hungarian Honvéd, was the standing army of the Kingdom of Hungary, established as one of four armed forces (Bewaffnete Macht or Wehrmacht) of Austria-Hungary from 1867 to 1918. The others were its counterpart the Austrian Landwehr, the Common Army, and the Imperial and Royal Navy.

In the wake of fighting between the Austrian Empire and Hungarian rebels during the Hungarian Revolution of 1848, and the two decades of uneasy co-existence following, Hungarian soldiers served either in mixed units or were stationed away from Hungarian areas. With the Austro-Hungarian Compromise of 1867 the new tripartite army was brought into being. It existed until the dissolution of the Austro-Hungarian Empire following World War I in 1918.

The Hungarian Landwehr should not be confused with its successor, the Royal Hungarian Army, which went by the same Hungarian name, but existed from 1922 to 1945.

== Prussia ==
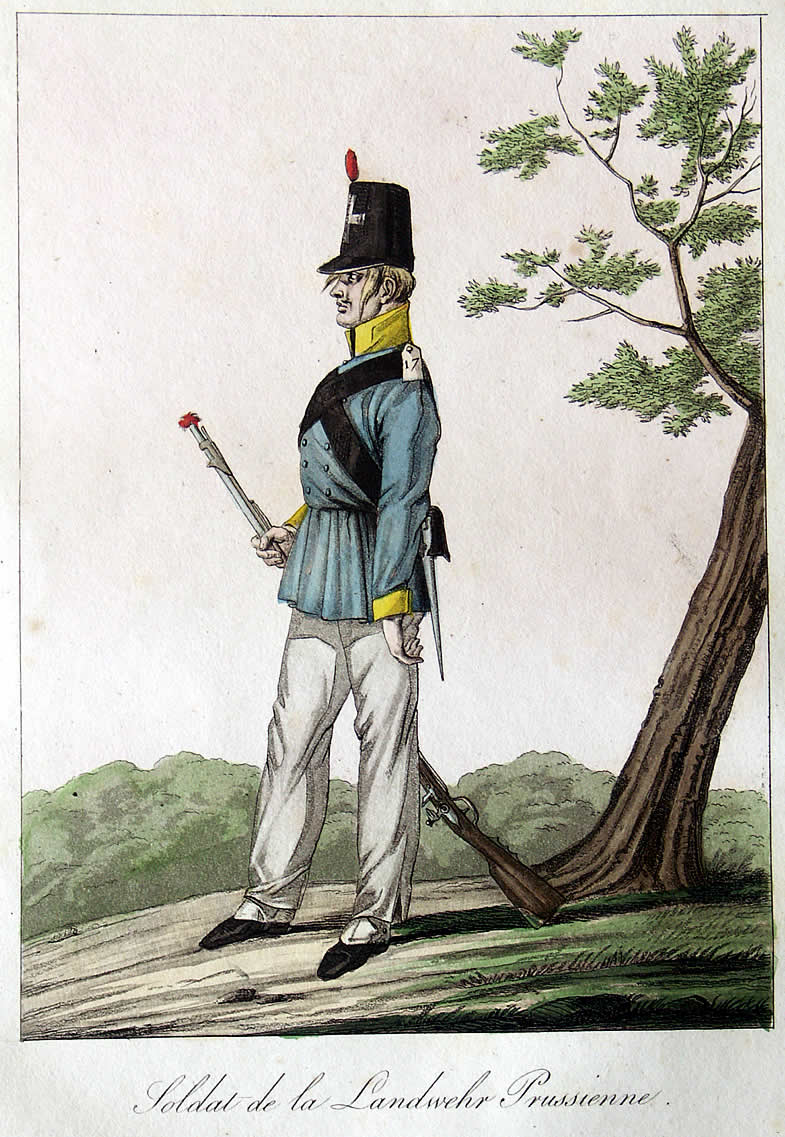
Soldier of the Prussian Landwehr, 1815

A royal edict of 17 March 1813 first established the Prussian Landwehr, which called up all men between the ages of eighteen and forty-five capable of bearing arms and not serving in the regular army, for the defense of the kingdom. After the peace of 1815 this force became an integral part of the Prussian Army, each brigade being composed of one line and one Landwehr regiment. This, however, slowed the mobilisation of brigades, as Landwehr regiments had to be called up, diminishing the value of the first line. By the re-organisation of 1859, the Landwehr troops were relegated to the second line.

== Nazi Germany ==
During the Weimar Republic, Germany was not allowed a standing army of more than 100,000 men. Thus conscription had been abolished. In the course of the rearmament of Germany, the Landwehr was reestablished on 21 May 1935 comprising all Germans liable for military service under the new law older than 35 years of age and younger than 45 years. In effect only one Landwehr division (the 14th Landwehr Division) was called up, the remainder of the Landwehr was used either to fill out the 3rd wave infantry divisions or formed Landesschützen battalions used for guard and occupation duty.

== Switzerland ==
In Switzerland, the Landwehr used to be a second line force, in which all citizens served for twelve years. It was abolished after the army reform in 1965. As a reference to this past, a number of Swiss wind bands bear the name "Landwehr" in their titles.

== Baltic Landeswehr ==
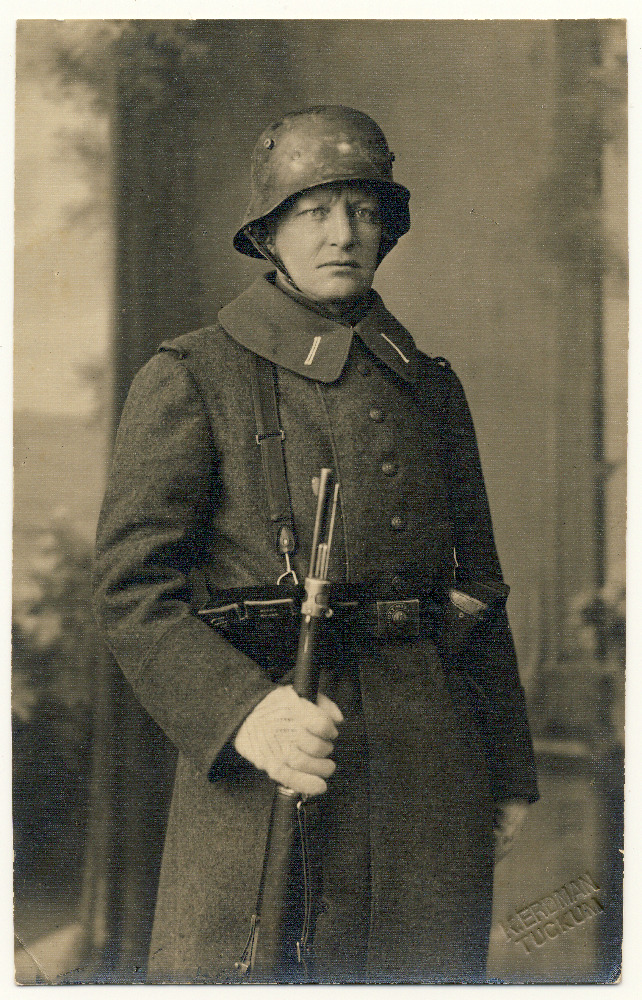
Estonian member of the Baltic Landeswehr

The Baltic Landeswehr was the name of the armed forces of the puppet government of Latvia established by the Baltic nobility. The Baltic state was designed to be established from territories that were ceded by Imperial Russia in the Treaty of Brest-Litovsk in 1918, but collapsed in the Estonian War of Independence in 1919.

== See also ==
- Croatian Home Guard (Croatian Landwehr)
- Landsturm
- National Guard (disambiguation)
- Slovensko domobranstvo (Slovenian Landwehr)
- Volkssturm
