= Battle of Eccles Hill =

1870 Fenian raid into Canada

- Part of the Fenian Raids
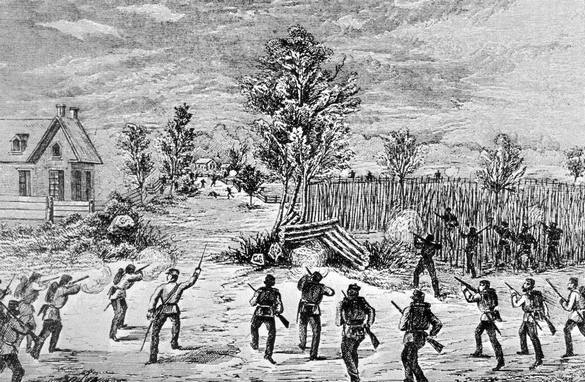
- The Battle of Eccles Hill. Contemporary illustration.
Date	May 25, 1870
Location	near Frelighsburg and Saint-Armand, Quebec 45.0199°N 72.9044°W
Result	Canadian victory

Belligerents
Fenian Brotherhood	Canada

Commanders and leaders
John O'Neill	William Osborne Smith; Brown Chamberlin

Units involved
Unknown	60th Missisquoi Battalion; Red Sash Home Guard (Canadian Militia)

Strength
680 militia 1 cannon	60 home guard more than 600 militia

Casualties and losses
2 dead 18 wounded 1 cannon captured	None

National Historic Site of Canada
- Official name: Battle of Eccles Hill National Historic Site of Canada
- Designated: 1923

The Battle of Eccles Hill (/ˈɛkəlz/) was part of a raid into Canadian territory from the United States led by John O'Neill of the Fenian Brotherhood, intended to pressure Great Britain to grant sovereignty to Ireland. In 1870, the Fenians crossed the Canadian border and proceeded to the top of Eccles Hill where they were confronted by members of the Canadian home guard and volunteers. The Fenians were overwhelmed by local militia units and armed citizens on May 25, 1870, and were compelled to abandon what was anticipated to have been a "glorious victory".

== John O'Neill and the "Fenian Raid" ==
John O'Neill initially called for the intrusion to go as far as St.Jean and Richmond, which was by the waterway coming from Montreal. He was looking there because the waterway reached the ultimate goal, the Canadian Railroad. The Fenians needed to have numerous organized assaults happening simultaneously.

On May 25, 1870, O'Neill had over 200 troopers. He traveled to Franklin, Vermont, and from there to Eccles Hill, Canada. In O'Neill's march to Canada, he encountered George Foster, a U.S. Marshal, twice before crossing the border. In their first encounter, Foster warned the men of a new set of neutrality laws. The Fenians ignored the Marshal and continued over the border. The marshal warned them that Canadian riflemen awaited them at Eccles Hill, acting under orders from British and Canadian officials whose informants within the Fenian Brotherhood provided them with details of the intended attack.

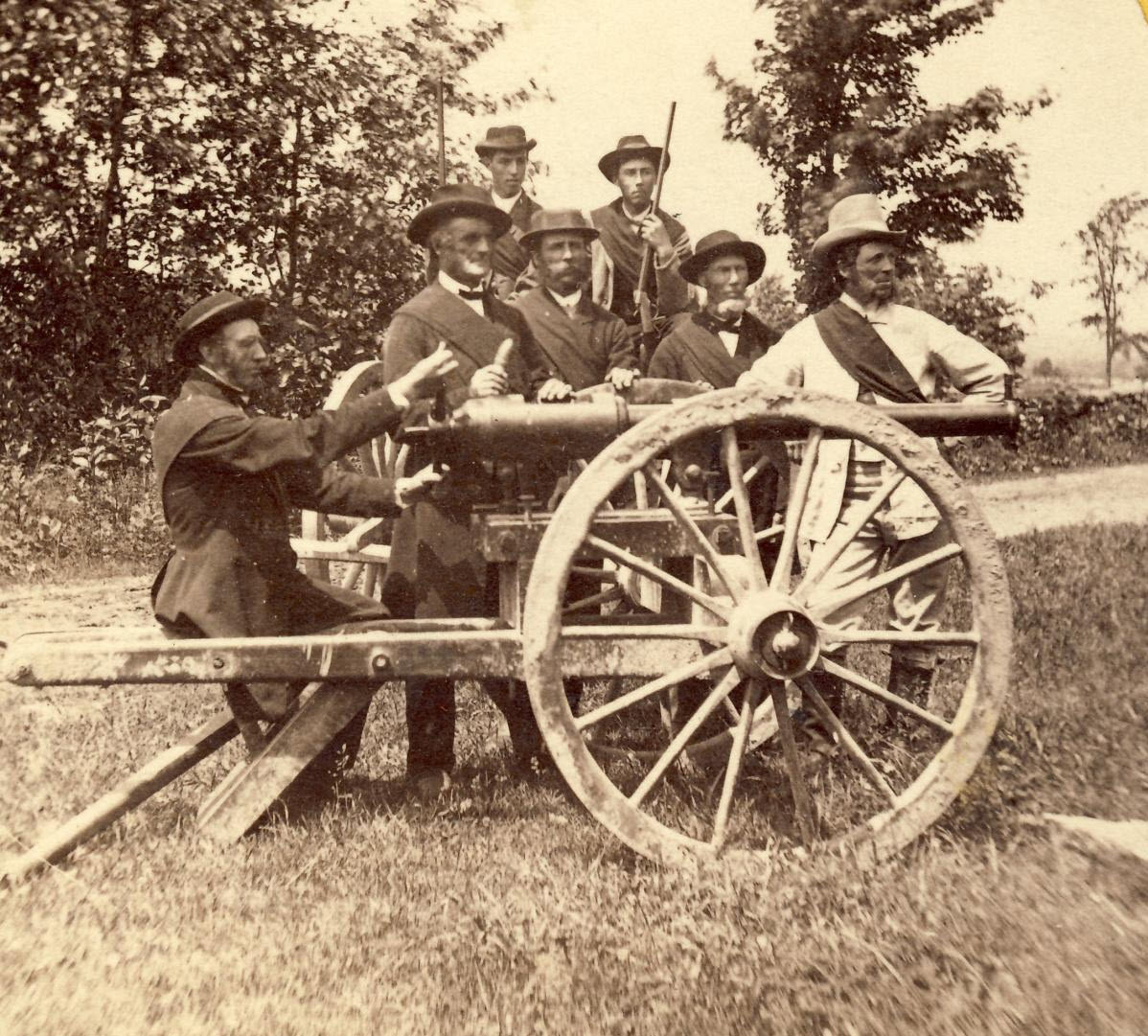
Canadian Home-Guards displaying with a disbanded Fenian Cannon

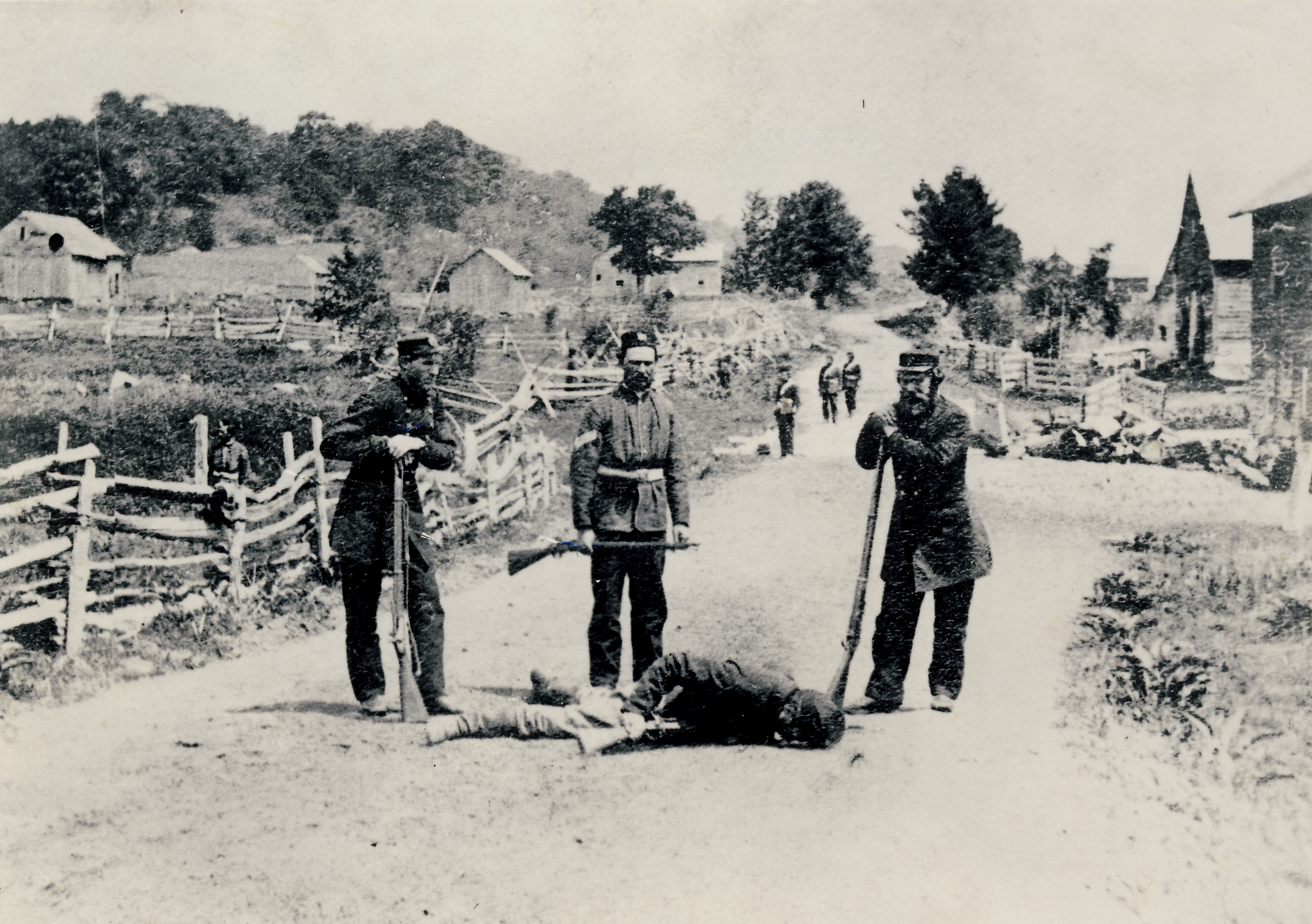
Border volunteers stand over the dead body of Fenian John Rowe of Burlington, Vermont on 25, May 1870

The layout of the Battle of Eccles hill

== Battle ==
On May 25, 1870, a force of Canadian militia and armed citizens of the Red Sash militia waited for the Fenians at the summit of Eccles Hill. When the Fenians charged the Canadians, it was a perfect time for James Pell of Dunham to crawl up to top of the hill. James Pell took out his musket and looked to aim at the first person wearing green rushing to the top of the hill. In the silence, James fired a shot and a hit Fenian John Rowe in the neck. Then the Fenians were treated to a hail storm of gunfire from the Canadian bullets after Pell's commanding first shot. Even though they had discussed many times, they squeezed off their first rounds only when the green (the Fenians wore leftover Union clothing with a green jacket) and blue figures reached Canadian soil. The Canadians were fortified behind the hill, and the firing soon became a steady firefight. Many of the younger soldiers were struck with panic at the sight of their fallen comrade and their first taste of combat. This halted the advance of the Fenians, who took cover and returned fire. Lieutenant-Colonel William Osborne Smith hurried to the field with a force of Canadian militia volunteers. Together with the armed citizens, the Canadian militia charged the Fenian into defensive fighting positions. Many Fenian Soldiers disbanded and hid behind walls, some jumped into the water, and in the midst of this gun fighting, William O'Brien of Moriah was shot dead. The Canadians drove the Fenians into retreat as a hail of ammunition shot around them, leaving behind their artillery and two dead soldiers. This was significant to the Canadian battalion and this volunteer since the Canadians were outnumbered by the Fenians nearly six to 1. Nevertheless, the Canadians suffered many casualties during the engagement, but none were fatal.

== Aftermath ==
In the aftermath of the battle, when O'Neill was returning from the battle, they stopped to treat a lying injured Fenian soldier. Then a U.S. Marshall named Marshal George P. Foster who was riding by took O'Neill and declared him under arrest and charged him for violating neutrality laws. With the arrest of the commander, many Fenian soldiers started to desert their militia groups. Fenian officers were left with little choice but to abandon their position and find safe positions until they could escape under cover of the night. Once the final Canadian counter-attack happened, and the demoralized Fenian soldiers fled instead of fighting. They were throwing away ammunition, food, water all to lighten their load to escape. Fenians were to believe this would be a glorious superior win for them over the Canadians. However, they were very incorrect. Even after all these two days later, the Fenians crossed the border into Quebec. They were headed to Trout River; this was west of the Eccles hill. The 50th Canadian Battalion, the Montreal Volunteer Artillery, and the British 69th Regiment swiftly dealt with this invasion, and the Fenians fled back across the border. Again, there were no Canadian casualties.

== Legacy ==
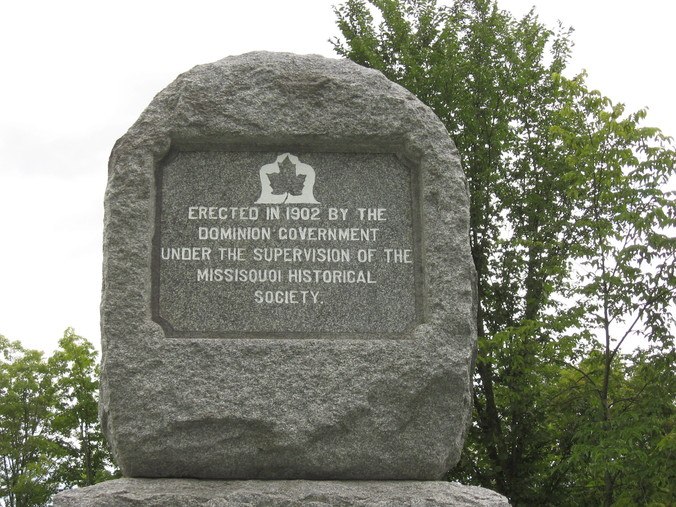
Monument erected in 1902 by the federal government under the supervision of the Missisquoi Historical Society

Eccles Hill Road, Frelighsburg, Quebec. Where Canadian Volunteers and Home Guards resisted the Fenian raiders – on 25 May 1870. The site of the granite monument was celebrated close to the battlefield and where the Canadians held their positions. However, even knowing that the true battle took place just south of the Canada–United States border. They established it in Canadian soil as to give national sense of pride. On 1 July 1902, more than three decades after the battle, under the liberal government leader Wilfrid Laurier, in collaboration with the Missisquoi Historical Society, a granite monument was placed to commemorate the battle and the people who fought in it. On its inaugural day, many spectators participating in the event wore red scarves to honour the veterans present. This was because during the battle many of the Canadians didn't have a uniform, therefore they wore bright red scarves over their shoulders. Many of these bright red streamers were placed in the bushes along the road to guide the more than a hundred guests towards Eccles Hill

Brome-Missisquoi veteran soldiers from the Missisquoi 60th Battalion wore their new commemorative military medals engraved with the Fenian Raids of 1866–1870 inscription. Thirty years after the Battle Of Eccles hill, the Canadian authorities decided to decorate all veterans who had helped repel the Fenian invasion. Thanks to the incorporated registry constituted in 1866 and 1870, today, we can identify who was part of the Volunteer Canadian militia.

== Further references ==
- Cline, Lawrence E. Rebels on the Niagara: the Fenian Invasion of Canada, 1866. Albany: Excelsior Editions, an imprint of State University of New York Press, 2018.
- Klein, Christopher. When the Irish Invaded Canada: the Incredible True Story of the Civil War Veterans Who Fought for... Ireland's Freedom. S.l.: ANCHOR, 2020.
- Ryan, Desmond. The Fenian Chief: a Biography of James Stephens. Coral Gables, 1969.
- Senior, Hereward (1991). The Last Invasion of Canada: The Fenian Raids, 1866–1870. Dundurn. ISBN 978-1-77070-064-2.
- Steward, Patrick, and Bryan P. McGovern. The Fenians: Irish Rebellion in the North Atlantic World, 1858-1876. Knoxville: University of Tennessee Press, 2013.
- Vronsky, Peter. Ridgeway: the American Fenian Invasion and the 1866 Battle That Made Canada. Toronto, Ontario: Penguin, an imprint of Penguin Canada, 2012.
