= Home Guard potato =

Variety of potato

'Home Guard'
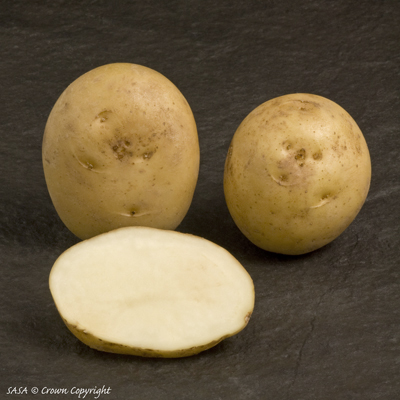
- Genus: solanum
- Species: Solanum tuberosum
- Cultivar: 'Home Guard'
- Breeder: McGill and Smith, Ayr
- Origin: Scotland 1942

Home Guard is a potato variety grown mainly in Ireland. Of an oval shape it is an early variety with moderate to low yields, typically harvested and available in shops by mid-May. The flesh is white or cream coloured, but shows a tendency to discoloration when cooked. It is susceptible to several diseases, including blight, potato cyst nematode and powdery scab.
