= Ordenanças =

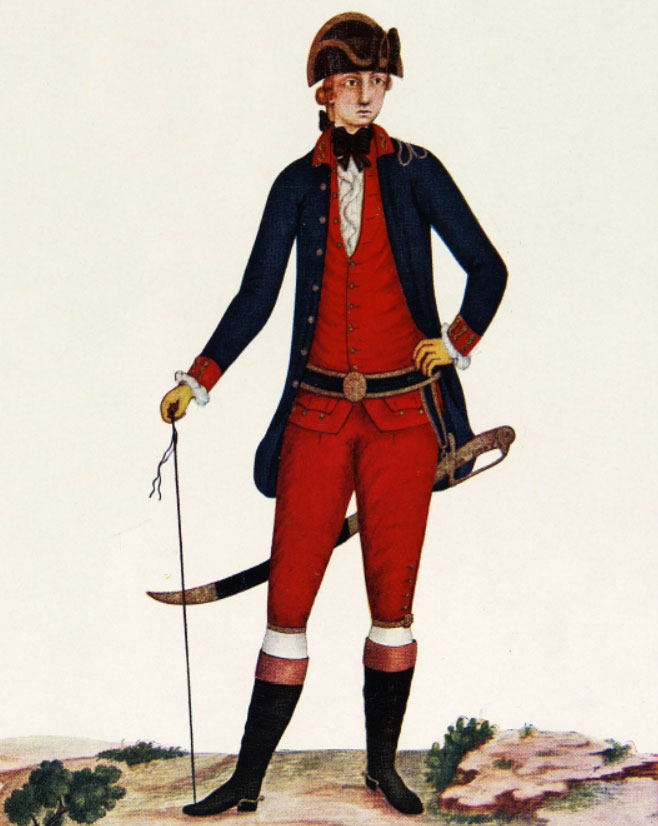
- An officer of an ordenanças unit in colonial Brazil (1770s)
- Active: 1570-1831
- Country: Kingdom of Portugal
- Allegiance: King of Portugal
- Type: Militia
- Anniversaries: 10 December
- Engagements: Battle of Alcácer Quibir; War of the Portuguese Succession; Portuguese Restoration War; War of the Spanish Succession; Seven Years' War; War of the Oranges; Peninsular War; Liberal Wars

The ordenanças (English: ordinances) were a type of militia unit which existed in the Portuguese Empire between the 16th and 19th centuries. By the 17th century, the ordenanças had become the de facto home guard and military reserve force of the Kingdom of Portugal. The last ordenanças units were disbanded in 1831.

== History ==
After some failed attempts, the Ordenanças were instituted by King Sebastian of Portugal on 10 December 1570. They were the first country-wide system of conscription in Portugal and thus are considered the ancestor of the future Portuguese national army.

They were organized in territorial captaincies (capitanias), each covering the area of a city, town or municipality and including several companies. Each captaincy was under charge of a captain-major (capitão-mor), appointed by the respective municipal council or, in towns where an alcaide (castle governor) existed, he assumed that role. Therefore, the organization and command of the Ordenanças usually fell to the most notable local residents of each jurisdiction. Each captain-major was assisted by a sergeant-major (sargento-mor).

The basis of the Ordenanças were the companies of 250 men. Each company was headed by a captain (capitão), assisted by an ensign (alferes), a sergeant, a marshal (meirinho) and a scrivener. It was divided in 10 squads (esquadras), each one headed by a corporal (cabo de esquadra).

For King Sebastian's Morocco Campaign of 1578, the Ordenanças mobilized 32 companies with a total of around 8000 men, constituting four terços of the Portuguese expeditionary army.

After Portugal was taken over by the Habsburg dynasty in 1580, the Ordenanças declined.

=== 17th century reorganization ===
The Ordenanças were revived for the Portuguese Restoration War (1640-1668). In addition, units of paid troops and units of auxiliary troops (latter called "Militias") were also created. These became, respectively, the first and second line of the Portuguese Army, the Ordenanças being relegated to third line and increasingly employed as a kind of home guard and reserve for the conscription of soldiers for the paid and auxiliary troops.

The Ordenanças of the city of Lisbon were organized in regiments, due to the fact that the inhabitants of this city were exempt from serving in the first and second lines, between the 17th century and early 19th century.

=== 18th century ===
According to the military reforms undertaken in 1764 by the Count of Lippe, the Ordenanças captaincies were grouped in 45 recruitment districts, each corresponding to one of the 43 Army first line infantry regiments and 2 naval infantry regiments.

=== 19th century ===
The Army organization of 1806 divided the country in 24 brigades of Ordenanças, each commanded by a colonel. Each brigade corresponded to a geographical area which constituted the recruitment district of an infantry regiment of the first line and of two militia regiments. Each brigade, by itself, was divided in eight captaincies and each of these in eight companies. Each captaincy corresponded to each of the eight fusiliers company in each regiment.

Although mainly used as conscription reserve since the creation of the auxiliary troops in 1646, active units of Ordenanças were activated for the national defense in some war periods. Some of these units acted as guerrilla forces in their respective areas, attacking the rearguard and the logistic lines of the enemy invader armies. Active units of the Ordenanças were also employed in the reinforcement of cities and fortress garrisons. A good example of this was the Peninsular War, where units of Ordenanças constituted a greater part of the garrison of the forts of the Lines of Torres Vedras, including being responsible for manning most of its artillery.

In 1809, in the scope of the Peninsular War, 16 national legions of Ordenanças were organized for the defense of the city of Lisbon. Each national legion included three battalions, with each including 10 companies of 105 men. For the mobilization of the legions, the city was divided in 16 legion districts, each subdivided in three battalion zones. In 1829, the national legions of Lisbon were disbanded and replaced by eight regiments of Ordenanças.

The Ordenanças were finally extinct on the 24 March 1831, their role partially assumed by the newly created National Guard.
