= Croatian Home Guard =

Croatian Home Guard may refer to several historic military formations:

- Royal Croatian Home Guard (1868–1918), regular army of the Kingdom of Croatia-Slavonia, then part of the Austro-Hungarian Monarchy
- Croatian Home Guard (World War II) (1941–1944), regular army of the Independent State of Croatia
- Home Guard (1991–2003), reserve force of the Croatian Army
- Home Guard (1992–1995), section of the Croatian Defence Council which operated in present-day Bosnia and Herzegovina
