= Ballard Rifle =

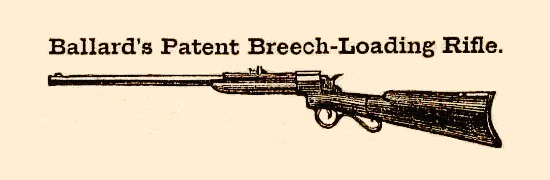
- Type: Breechloading Rifle
- Place of origin: United States

Service history
- Used by: Union (American Civil War); Canada
- Wars: American Civil War; Fenian Raids

Production history
- Designer: Charles H. Ballard
- Designed: November 1861
- Manufacturer: Ball & Williams; R. Ball & Co. Dwight, Chapin & Co. Merrimack Arms and Manufacturing Co. Brown Manufacturing Co. Marlin Firearms
- Produced: 1862–1891
- No. built: 21,000+ (1862–1873) by various firms and then 40,000 by J.M Marlin and the Marlin Firearms Co.
- Variants: No. 0 and No. 1 Hunter's Rifle; No. 1 1/2 Hunter's Rifle; No. 1 3/4 Far West; No. 2 Sporting; No. 3 Gallery Rifle; No. 3 Pistol Grip Rifle; No. 3 1/2 Target; No. 4 Perfection; No. 4 1/4; No. 4 1/2 Mid Range; No. 4 1/2 A-1 Mid Range; No. 5 Pacific; No. 5 1/2 Montana; No. 6 Schuetzen; No. 6 1/2 Off-Hand; No. 6 1/2 Rigby Off-Hand; No. 6 1/2 Pistol Grip Off-Hand; No. 7 Long Range; No. 7 A-1 Long Range; No. 7 A-1 Extra Long Range; No. 8 Union Hill; No. 9 Union Hill; No. 10 Schuetzen Junior

Specifications
- Mass: 10.07 lbs (No. 1 Hunter's Model) 9 lbs (No. 2 Sporting Model) 10-12 lbs (No . 5 Pacific Model)
- Caliber: .44 Ballard Long (No. 1 Hunter's Model); .32 Long, .38 Long (No. 2 Sporting Model); .32-40 Ballard; .38-50 Ballard; .38-55 Ballard; .40-63/70 Ballard; .40-65 Ballard; .40-70 Sharps; .44-75 Ballard; .44-77 Sharps; .40-85/90 Ballard; .44-90 Sharps; .44-100 Ballard; .40-90 Ballard; .40-90 Sharps; .45-70 Government; .50-70 Government; .44-40 Winchester; .45-100 Ballard; .45 Sharps

The Ballard Rifle was a single shot, breechloading longarm used during the American Civil War by Kentucky volunteers and by Canadian militia during the Fenian raids.

== History ==
The Ballard Rifle was designed and patented by Charles H. Ballard in November 1861 in Worcester, Massachusetts. Around 3,000 were made between 1862 and 1865, with some being used for military use in Kentucky. Ballard rifles used by Kentucky Volunteers will have Kentucky marked on them.

== Variants ==
Variants were built by Ball & Williams (1862–1865), Dwight Chapin & Co. (1862–1863), and later by R. Ball & Co. (1865–1867), Merrimack Arms (1867–1868), and Brown Manufacturing (1869–1873). The last and most successful maker was J.M. Marlin Firearms Co., who built more models than any predecessor (1870–1890).

The Ballard rifle had over 20 variants during its 29-year lifespan. The No. 1 Hunter's Model was first introduced in 1875 for the .44 rimfire caliber. The No. 1 would later be produced in .44 rimfire, .45-70 Government, .44 Ballard Long, & .44 Ballard Extra Long. This version along with the No. 5 1/2 Montana are known for being one of the main rifles used to hunt buffalo. Other variants included the No. 1 3/4 Hunter's Model, No. 2 Sporting Model, No. 5 Pacific Model, and the No. 5 1/2 Montana Model.

== See also ==
- Rifles in the American Civil War
