= .44 Henry =

Rimfire revolver and rifle cartridge

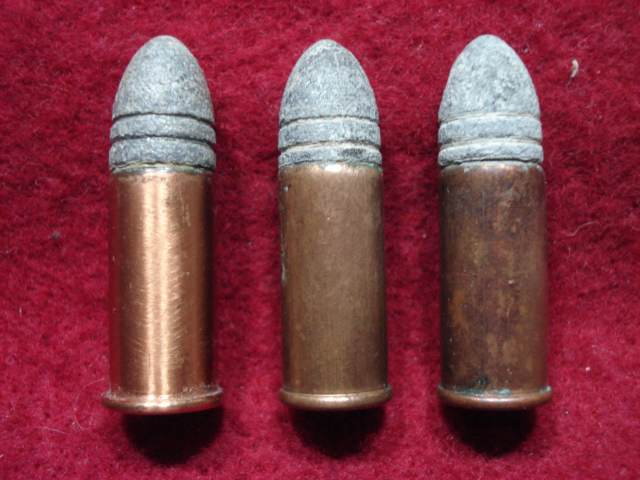
- .44 Henry cartridges
- Type: Rifle and handgun
- Place of origin: United States

Production history
- Designer: New Haven Arms Company
- Designed: 1860
- Produced: 1860–1920s/1930s

Specifications
- Case type: Rimmed, straight
- Bullet diameter: .446 in (11.3 mm)
- Neck diameter: .434 in (11.0 mm)
- Base diameter: .441 in (11.2 mm)
- Rim diameter: .518 in (13.2 mm)
- Rim thickness: .062 in (1.6 mm)
- Case length: .903 in (22.9 mm)
- Overall length: 1.345 in (34.2 mm)
- Primer type: Rimfire
- Maximum pressure (CIP): 14,500 psi (100 MPa)

Ballistic performance
Bullet mass/type	Velocity	Energy
200 gr (13 g) lead	1,125 ft/s (343 m/s)	568 ft⋅lbf (770 J)

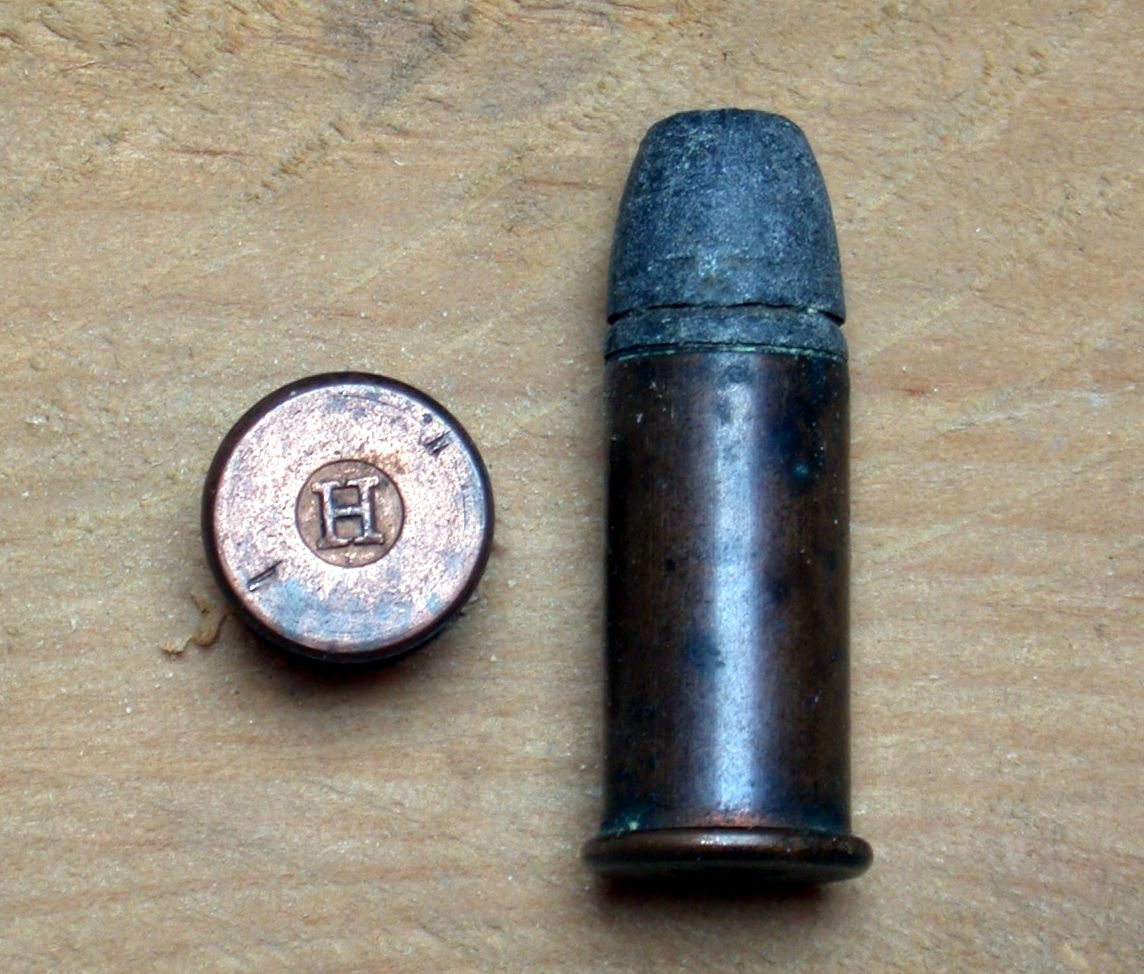
.44 Henry Flat cartridge

The .44 Henry, also known as the .44 Henry Flat, the .44 Rimfire, the .44 Long Rimfire, and the 11x23mmRF (11x23mm Rimmed) in Europe, is a rimfire rifle and handgun cartridge featuring a .875 in (22.2 mm)-long brass or copper case. The round has a total overall length of 1.345 in (34.2 mm), with a 200 or 216 gr (12.96 or 14.00 g; 0.46 or 0.49 oz) .446 in (11.3 mm)-diameter cast solid-lead heeled bullet. The original propellant load is 26 to 28 gr (1.68 to 1.81 g; 0.06 to 0.06 oz) of black powder. The round has a muzzle velocity of approximately 1,125 ft/s (343 m/s), giving a muzzle energy of 568 foot-pounds (770 joules).

== Background ==
The cartridge is named after the intended firearm of use, the Henry rifle, which is in turn named after Benjamin Tyler Henry, the 19th-century American gunsmith who invented both the cartridge and the rifle of that name. Henry designed both in his spare time while he was the foreman of the New Haven Arms Company, and was granted a US patent for his creations on October 16, 1860. While it was not the first repeating rifle, it was one of the first successful designs (alongside the Spencer rifle), and it provided the basis for the iconic Winchester rifle, and all modern lever-action rifles. Part of the Henry rifle's great success was due to its relatively novel self-contained metallic cartridge, which allowed the rifle's repeating mechanism to function reliably; the rifle was based on the Volition & Volcanic Repeaters whose main issue was the unreliability of their caseless Rocket Ball ammunition. Other breechloaders of the time often relied on a simple, separate percussion cap for ignition, just like a typical muzzleloader of the era, and often used paper or linen cartridge cases, which provided no obturation, or sealing of the breech against the expanding gases (such as the Sharps rifle). Some utilized self-contained primers, but still lacked metallic cases (the Dreyse "needle gun"). While these one-shot breechloading weapons were great improvements over the muzzleloader, it required the adoption of the self-contained metallic case before repeaters could become viable weapons. The .44 Henry was an early self-contained metallic cartridge, and was one of the main reasons for the ultimate success of the Henry rifle.

== Ballistics ==
The cartridge's original 200-grain bullet had a flat nose. A bullet with a more pointed nose was later used in order to decrease aerodynamic drag and increase range. Even so, it still achieved a ballistic coefficient of only 0.153, which reflects very poor long range capabilities; the .44 Henry is a large and slow bullet, giving poor external ballistics and a great deal of ballistic drop during its trajectory, making hitting a target past 200 yards almost impossible for the average shooter. Modern comparisons to the .44 Henry rifle's ballistics would include such large-bore handgun cartridges as the 200 gr .45 ACP, and 200 gr .44 Special, or black powder "cowboy loads" of early rifle cartridges like the .44-40 WCF and .45 Colt. Due to the vast advances in propellant and metallurgy technology, these latter can nearly achieve the Henry Rifle's velocity from a handgun, and do not even require the long barrel of a rifle to give equivalent velocity. By modern standards, the resulting effective range for the .44 Henry fired from a rifle on military targets or small to medium game would be up to 200 yards. However, when it was introduced in 1860, standards such as effective range to ensure a humane kill and a hit in a vital area were far more lax, and most hunters were accustomed to hunting game at short ranges in any case. Such performance was not unusual or remarkable, and the idea of weapons capable of engaging a target at hundreds of yards was generally reserved for dedicated, long-barreled target rifles and trained shooters. A .44 Henry is not particularly less accurate than a muzzleloading Springfield carbine; a longer-barreled Springfield rifle musket could theoretically hit at ranges of up to 300 yd (270 m), but such performance was rarely within the ability of the average soldier, and was generally achieved only by designated "sharpshooters". For a typical infantry or cavalry soldier, or hunter, a rifle accurate at 100 yd (91 m) was sufficient. The ability to fire 16 rounds before reloading made the Henry's lack of long range capability even less of an issue.

== Use ==
The .44 Henry cartridge was used most notably in the Henry Model 1860 repeating rifle. This rifle was first used in the American Civil War, mainly by Union cavalry troops, although only in very limited numbers. It was also used by the very few Confederate troops who managed to capture one of these rifles along with a supply of ammunition, which was impossible to find in the Confederate south; a few were even purchased by wealthy Confederates.

After the Civil War, the Henry cartridge was used in the Winchester Model 1866 rifles during the Franco-Prussian War 1870/71 by the French and by the Ottoman Empire during the Russo-Turkish War (1877–1878).

In civilian models, Winchester Model 1866 rifles and carbines, Smith & Wesson No. 3 Revolvers, Colt Model 1860 Army long cylinder conversion and the Colt Model 1871-72 "Open Top" revolvers were available in .44 Henry. From 1875 until 1880, Colt produced the Model 1873 Single Action Army in .44 Henry to accommodate owners of Henry Model 1860 and Winchester Model 1866 rifles and carbines.

== Later developments ==
The cartridge cases were originally made from copper, and later brass. The cartridge was still commercially made into the 1930s.

The .44 Henry cartridge was perfected by George R. Stetson's U.S. Patent 120403, assigned to the Winchester Repeating Arms Company on October 31, 1871. It has as its object the use of swaged and lubricated projectiles of greater perfection in shape.

== See also ==
- List of rimfire cartridges
- List of handgun cartridges
- List of rifle cartridges
- Table of handgun and rifle cartridges
