= Evans repeating rifle =

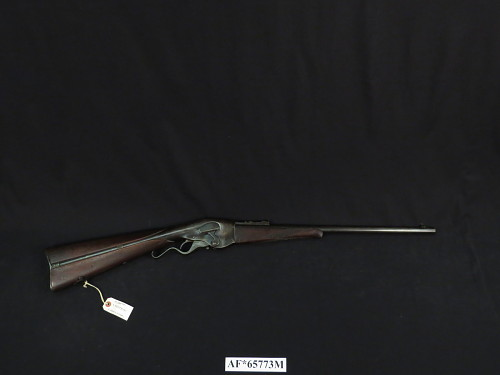
- Type: Lever-action center-fire rifle
- Place of origin: United States

Service history
- Used by: Peru
- Wars: War of the Pacific

Production history
- Designer: Warren R. Evans
- Manufacturer: Evans Repeating Rifle Company
- Produced: 1873–1879
- No. built: Approx. 15,000

Specifications
- Caliber: .44 Evans short, .44 Evans long
- Action: Lever-action
- Feed system: 28 to 34-round rotary magazine

The Evans repeating rifle was a lever-action repeating rifle designed by Warren R. Evans as a high capacity repeater.

== Overview ==
The Evans Repeating Rifle was invented by Warren R. Evans, a dentist from Thomaston, Maine. With the help of his brother George, they perfected the rifle and started the "Evans Rifle Manufacturing Company" of Mechanic Falls, Maine in 1873. Their rifles were marketed by Merwin & Hulbert, who also invested into the company. The hope was that the rifle would be issued by the United States Army, but the rifle failed the standard dust test.

It was then offered as a sporting rifle. The rifle has a radial block receiver similar to the Spencer, but the rounds were fed from an Archimedean-screw magazine which formed the spine of the rifle stock and could hold up to 28 rounds. The fluted cartridge carrier made a quarter turn each time the lever was operated, feeding a new cartridge into the breech.

The round was unique to the rifle. The mechanism of the rifle was not very sturdy and was unreliable when dirty. The Evans Rifle Manufacturing Company went bankrupt in December 1879, a victim of the post war arms market expansion and keen competition.

A total of almost 15,000 Evans repeating rifles were produced between 1873 and 1879. A good portion of these survived, and a number are advertised in various antique arms publications. The rifle was the only firearm mass-produced in the state of Maine in the 19th century. The Evans rifle also had the greatest magazine capacity of any rifle mass-produced in the 19th century.

== Design ==
Rotary helical Evans magazine

In terms of basic design, the Evans repeating rifle is similar to the Spencer repeating rifle. However, the Evans has a rotary helical magazine in the buttstock, and cartridges are fed into the breech by cycling the cocking lever/trigger guard. The magazine of the Evans also has a much higher capacity than that of the Spencer, up to 28 rounds. The Evans holds four rows of cartridges which are loaded through a trapdoor in the buttplate. Each time the action is cycled, the magazine feeds the next cartridge to the breech in a helical pattern.

== Old model ==
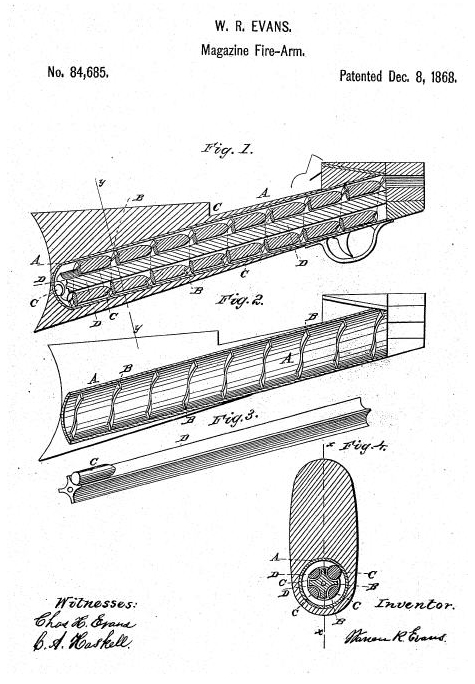
W. R. Evans patent, 1868

The first model of the rifle, commonly called the old model, was in production from 1873 to 1876. This model differs from later models mainly in that it has no lower buttstock, only an upper one. This means that the magazine tube is exposed along the bottom of the stock. In addition, the ejection port has no dust cover. Approximately 500 old models were produced. The first 200 of these have no cocking lever retaining stud on the underside of the magazine tube. Old models made after the first 200 have a stud or locking nut to hold the cocking lever in place. The barrels of the old models are marked "Evans Repeating Rifle/Pat. Dec 8, 1868 & Sept. 16, 1871".

Old model Evans rifles were made in the following configurations:

- Sporting rifle:

Walnut stock, checkering and engraving available on special order. 26", 28", and 30" octagon barrels. Estimated quantity made - 300.

- Military musket:

30" round barrel, full forend retained with 2 barrel bands. Estimated quantity made - 50.

- Carbine:

22" round barrel, short forend retained with a single barrel band. Sling swivels. Estimated quantity made - 150.

== Transition model ==
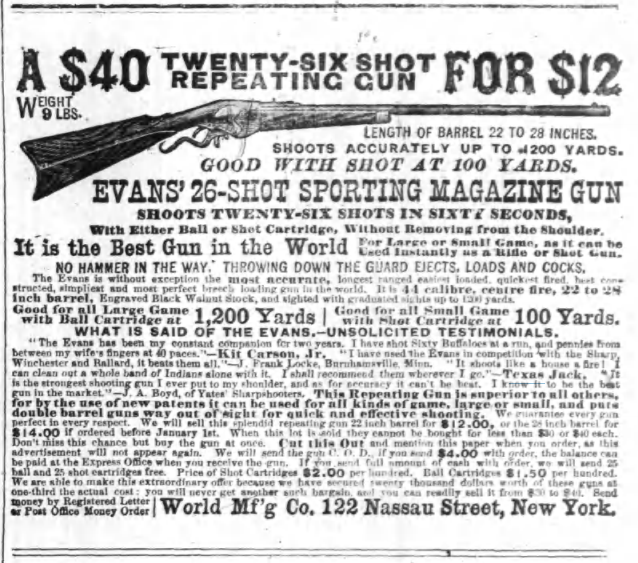
An advertisement for the Evans repeating rifle featured in the Spirit of the Times magazine, 1876

By early 1876, Evans modified the original and began producing the so-called Transition model. Unlike the old model, the transition model had a walnut lower buttstock, as well as a redesigned buttplate. These changes improved the balance of the rifle, as well as protecting it from damage. Barrel markings on the transition model are as follows: "Evans Repeating Rifle Mechanic Falls Me./Pat, Dec. 8, 1868 & Sept. 16, 1871".

Transition model Evans rifles were made in the following configurations:

- Sporting rifle:

Walnut stock, checkering and engraving available on special order. 26", 28", and 30" octagon barrels. Estimated quantity made - 1,050.

- Military musket:

30" round barrel, full forend retained with 2 or 3 barrel bands. Estimated quantity made - 150.

- Carbine:

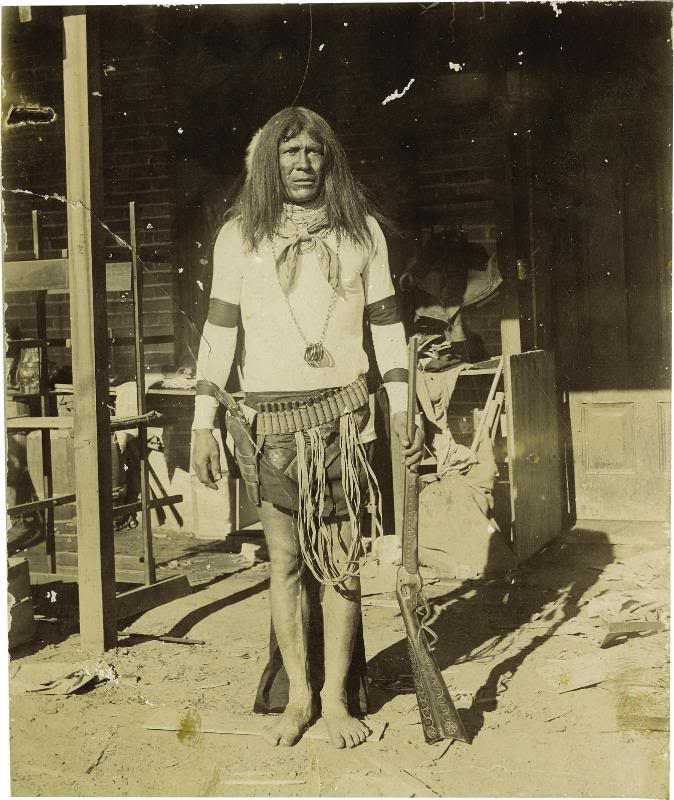
An Apache Indian holding an Evans Repeating Rifle, approximately 1880.

22" round barrel, short forend, single barrel band, sling swivels. Estimated quantity made - 450.

- Montreal carbine:

A rare variation believed to have been sold in Canada by Ralph H. Kilby. A sporting goods dealer in Montreal and Evans' Canadian agent. Estimated quantity made - less than 100.

== New model ==
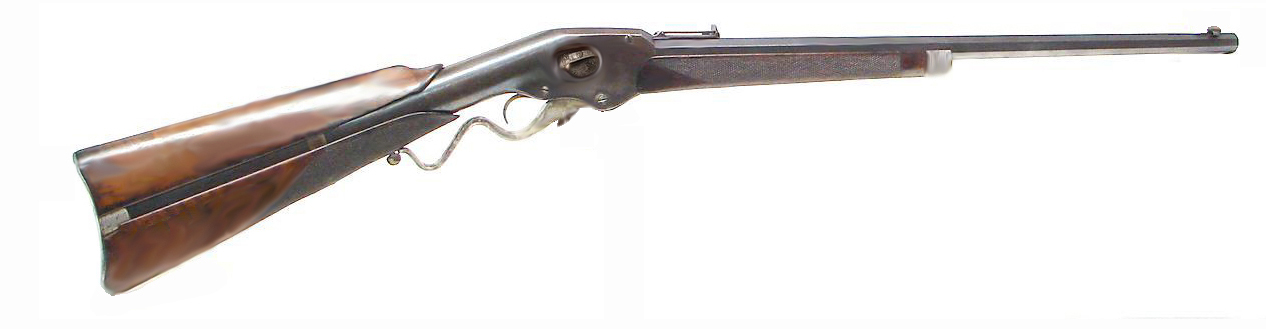
Evans lever-action carbine

The company received numerous testimonials from its customers. One of the more colorful ones allegedly came from Kit Carson Jr. (no relation to the original Kit Carson).

At twenty paces, have, with this rifle, shot the eyebrows from my wife, and every night regularly, in the presence of an audience I shot an apple from her hand, a pipe from her mouth, a penny from her fingers, or snuff a candle from her hand. I think the Evans is the safest and most complete repeating system ever devised.

Kit Carson Jr. was the stage name of Jim Spleen from Kansas, who appeared with William "Buffalo Bill" F. Cody. Testimonials like this were great advertising and highly sought after by all the arms companies. The Evans repeating rifle was also used by Buffalo Bill and his friend and stage partner Texas Jack Omohundro, who said, "It shoots like a house on fire! I can clean out a whole band of Indians alone with it. I shall recommend them wherever I go." Requests soon reached the factory from the far west for a more powerful cartridge. George Evans listened and then went to work. The new cartridge, together with numerous improvements in the design, were combined to make the new model Evans repeating rifle. By the summer of 1877, the new model was perfected and put into production.

The new model is easily distinguished by its larger, more robust receiver and sliding dust cover over the ejection port. The front edge of the receiver is cut straight not scalloped as in the old and transition models. The new model was chambered for a 1 ½" long .44 caliber cartridge case. Previous models used a 1" long case of the same caliber. The increased length of the new cartridge necessitated a reduction in magazine capacity to only 26 rounds. Barrel markings are the same as the transition model except with the addition of "U.S.A.".

New model Evans rifles were made into the following configurations:

- Sporting rifle:

Walnut stock, checkering and engraving available on special order. 26", 28", and 30" octagon barrels. Estimated quantity made - 3,000.

- Military musket:

30" round barrel, full forend retained with 2 barrel bands, many converted to sporting rifle. Estimated quantity made - 3,000.

- Carbine:

22" round barrel, short forend retained by a single barrel band, occasionally with a bayonet mounting stud. Estimated quantity made - 4,000 plus.

- "Evans Sporting Rifle" marked rifles:

Rifles found with this instead of the usual markings are believed to have been assembled from parts. These were mostly 30” round barrel military muskets which had a short forend attached with a screw. This forend is quite different from the usual sporting forend.

== Calibers ==
When Warren Evans designed his rifle he also had to design his own cartridge. What he came up with is now known as the .44 Evans short. This is noted in the factory catalogs as being a 1" shell. The original cartridges were loaded with 33 grains of black powder and a 220 grain lead bullet. This gave a velocity of about 850 fps. The more common new model Evans rifle used the 1.5" case. This was known as the ".44 New Model" cartridge. The original cartridges were loaded with 40 to 43 grains of black powder and lead bullets ranging from 275 to 300 grains. With a 280 grain bullet velocity was about 1,200 fps. Both cartridges were loaded by Winchester up to the early 1920s.

== Movies ==
- Used by Walter Barnes as Brokston in The Big Gundown (1966)
- Used by Forrie J. Smith as Pony Deal in Tombstone (1993)
- Used by Wilford Brimley as Joe Gill in Crossfire Trail (2001)

== Video games ==
- Red Dead Redemption (2010)
- Undead Nightmare (2010)
- Red Dead Redemption 2 (2018)
- Red Dead Online (2018)

== See also ==
- Henry rifle
- Spencer repeating rifle
- Winchester rifle
