= Winchester rifle =

Series of lever action repeating rifles

Winchester rifle series
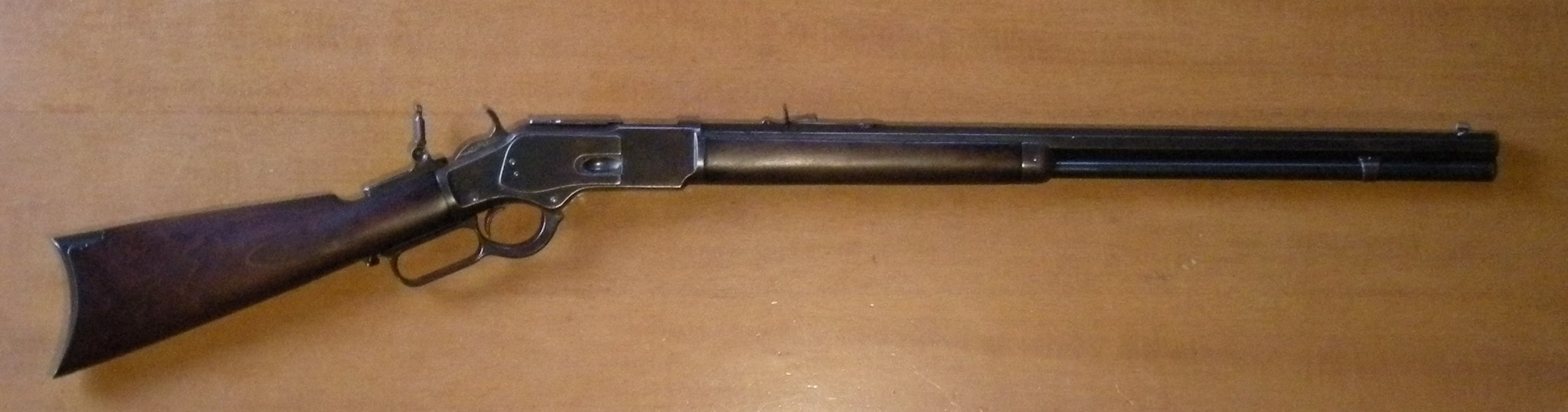
- Winchester Model 1873 rifle
- Type: Lever action rifle
- Place of origin: United States

Service history
- In service: 1866–present
- Used by: See § Users
- Wars: American Indian Wars; Range Wars; Franco-Prussian War; Japanese invasion of Taiwan; Russo-Turkish War (1877–1878); War of the Pacific; North-West Rebellion; Hawaiian rebellions (1887–1895); Second French intervention in Mexico; Tomochic Rebellion; Second Franco-Dahomean War; Federalist Revolution; First Italo-Ethiopian War; Spanish–American War; War of Canudos; Acre War; Boxer Rebellion; Second Boer War; Mexican Revolution; Balkan Wars; Royalist attack on Chaves; World War I 1923 Revolution; Constitutionalist Revolution; Spanish Civil War; World War II; Indonesian National Revolution; East German uprising of 1953; Araguaia Guerrilla War

Production history
- Designed: 1866
- Manufacturer: Winchester Repeating Arms Company
- Produced: 1866–present
- No. built: c. 720,000
- Variants: Full-stocked "Musket", Carbine, Sporting model

Specifications
- Mass: 9.5 lb (4.3 kg)
- Length: 49.3 in (125 cm)
- Barrel length: 30 in (76 cm)
- Caliber: .44 Henry.44-40 Winchester.38-40 Winchester.32-20 Winchester.22 Long Rifle
- Action: Lever action
- Feed system: Tube magazine, 7 to 14 rounds
- Sights: Graduated rear sights fixed-post front sights

A Winchester rifle is any of a series of lever-action repeating rifles manufactured by the Winchester Repeating Arms Company. Developed from the 1860 Henry rifle, Winchester rifles were among the earliest repeaters. The Model 1873 was particularly successful, being marketed by the manufacturer as "The Gun That Won the West".

== Predecessors ==
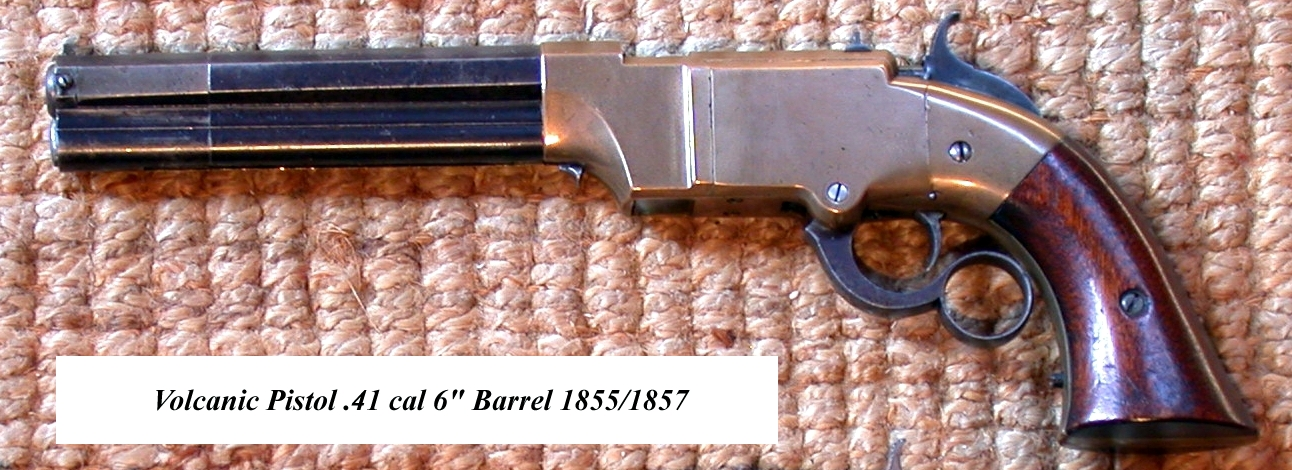
Volcanic pistol.

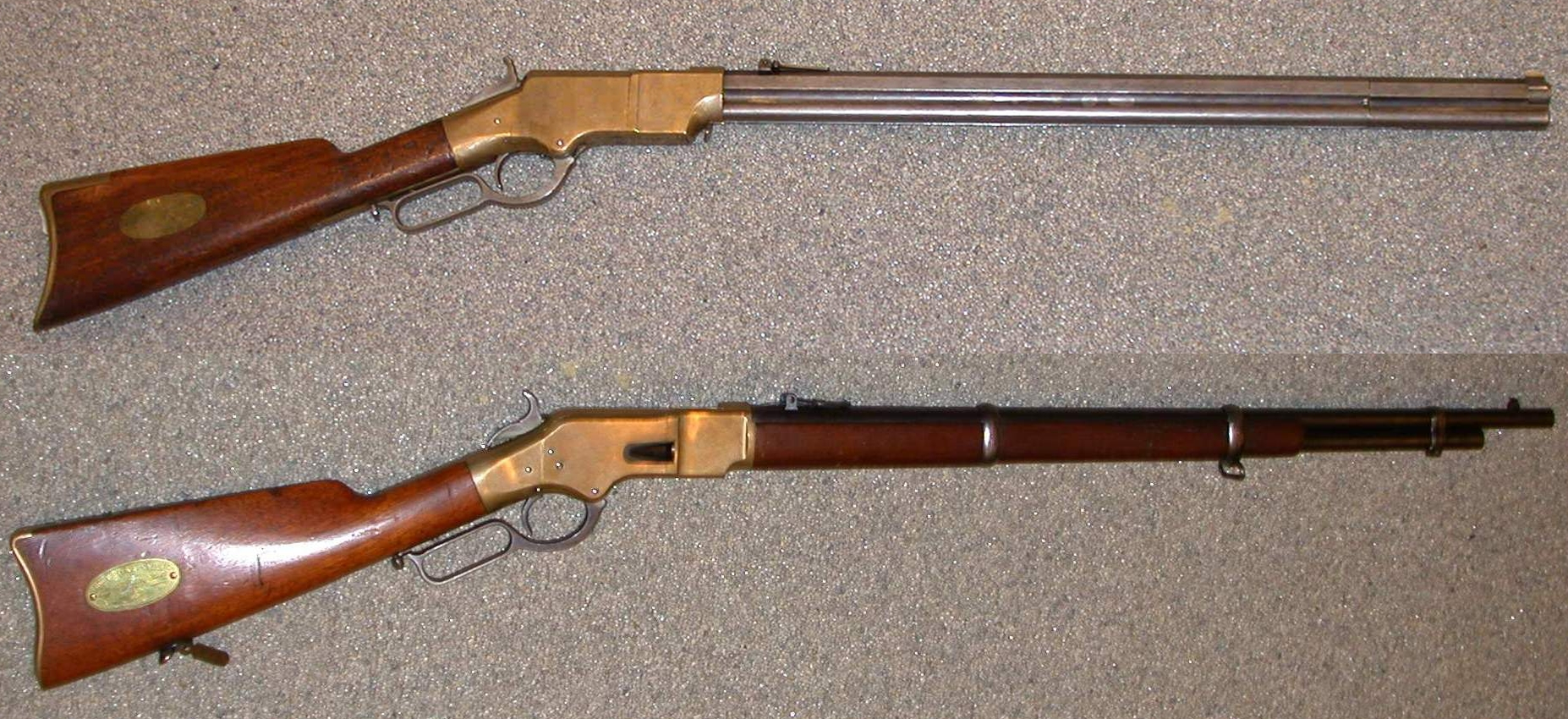
1860 Henry and 27 in (69 cm) Model 1866 Winchester Musket

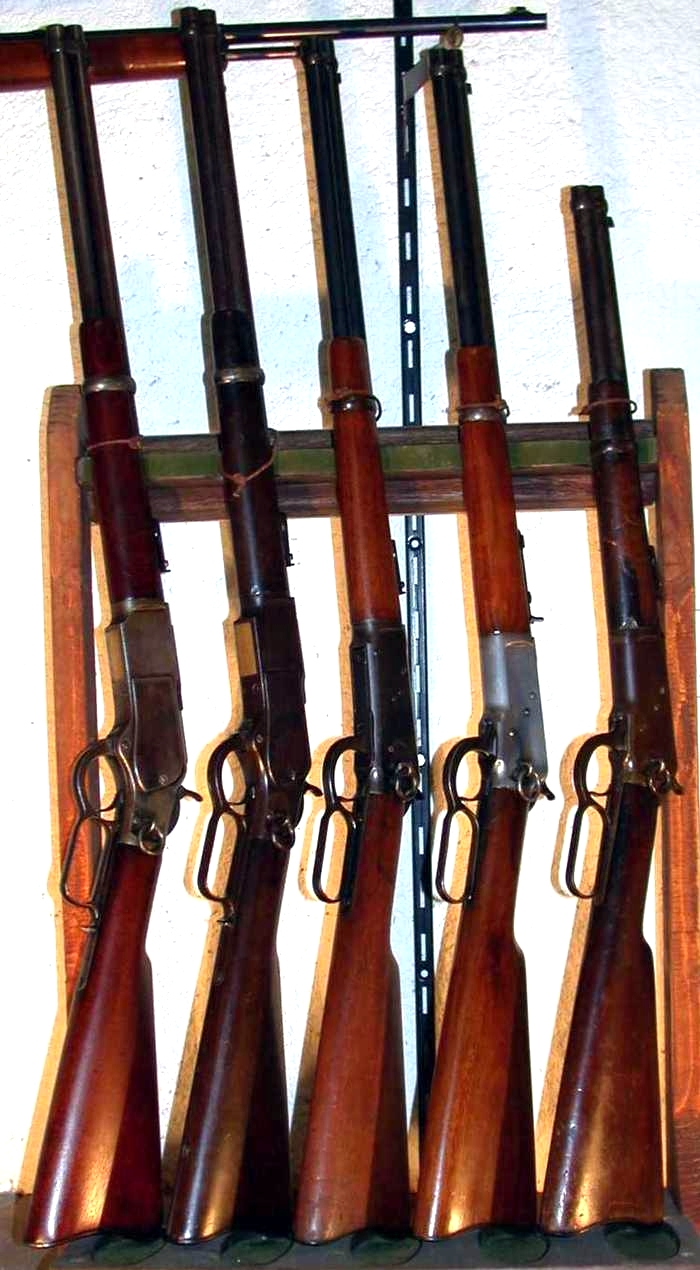
Winchester Carbines Left to right; two 1873, an 1894, an 1892, and a Trapper 92

=== Early designs ===
In 1848, Walter Hunt of New York patented his "Volition Repeating Rifle" incorporating a tubular magazine, which was operated by two levers and complex linkages. The Hunt rifle fired what he called the "Rocket Ball", an early form of caseless ammunition in which the powder charge was contained in the bullet's hollow base.

Hunt's design was fragile and unworkable but in 1849, Lewis Jennings purchased the Hunt patents and developed a functioning, if still complex, rifle. This version was produced in small numbers by Robbins & Lawrence of Windsor, Vermont, until 1852.

=== Volcanic arms ===
Horace Smith and Daniel Wesson of Norwich, Connecticut, acquired the Jennings patent from Robbins & Lawrence, as well as shop foreman Benjamin Tyler Henry.

Smith made several improvements to the Jennings design, and in 1855 Smith and Wesson together with several investors formed a corporation, the Volcanic Repeating Arms Company, to manufacture Smith's modification of the Hunt-Jennings, the Volcanic lever-action pistol and rifle. Its largest stockholder was Oliver Winchester.

=== Metallic cartridges ===
For the Volcanic rifle, Smith added a primer charge to Hunt's "Rocket Ball" and thus created one of the first fixed metallic cartridges which incorporated bullet, primer and powder in one self-contained unit.

While still with the company, Smith went a step further and added a cylindrical copper case to hold the bullet and powder with the primer in the case rim, thus creating one of the most significant inventions in firearms history: the metallic rimfire cartridge. (Note: Smith's cartridge was derived largely from the Flobert BB Cap, but the Flobert design contained no powder. The cylindrical case was in all likelihood inspired by another French design, the Lefaucheux pinfire cartridge.)

Smith's cartridge, the .22 Short, would be introduced commercially in 1857 with the landmark Smith & Wesson Model 1 revolver and is still manufactured today.

=== Reorganization ===
The Volcanic rifle had only limited success, which was partially attributable to the design and poor performance of the Hunt-derived Volcanic cartridge, a hollow conical ball filled with black powder and sealed by a cork primer. Although the Volcanic's repeater design far outpaced the rival technology, the unsatisfactory power and reliability of the .25 and .32 caliber "Rocket Balls" were little match for the competitors' larger calibers.

Wesson had left Volcanic soon after it was formed and Smith followed eight months later, to create the Smith & Wesson Revolver Company. Volcanic moved to New Haven in 1856, but by the end of that year became insolvent.

Oliver Winchester purchased the bankrupt firm's assets from the remaining stockholders and reorganized it as the New Haven Arms Company in April 1857.

=== Henry rifle ===
Benjamin Henry continued to work with Smith's cartridge concept and perfected the much larger, more powerful .44 Henry cartridge. Henry also supervised the redesign of the rifle to use the new ammunition, retaining only the general form of the breech mechanism and the tubular magazine.

This became the Henry rifle of 1860, which was manufactured by the New Haven Arms Company, and used in considerable numbers by certain Union army units in the American Civil War.

Confederates called the Henry "that damned Yankee rifle that they load on Sunday and shoot all week"

== Development ==
After the war, Oliver Winchester renamed New Haven Arms the Winchester Repeating Arms Company. The company modified and improved the basic design of the Henry rifle, creating the first Winchester rifle: the Model 1866. It retained the .44 Henry cartridge, was likewise built on a bronze-alloy frame, and had an improved magazine and a wooden forearm. In 1873 Winchester introduced the steel-framed Model 1873 chambering the more potent .44-40 centerfire cartridge. In 1876, in a bid to compete with the powerful single-shot rifles of the time, Winchester brought out the Model 1876 (Centennial Model). While it chambered more powerful cartridges than the 1866 and 1873 models, the toggle link action was not strong enough for the then popular high-powered rounds used in Sharps or Remington single-shot rifles.

From 1883, John Moses Browning worked in partnership with Winchester, designing a series of rifles and shotguns, most notably the lever-action Model 1886, Model 1892, Model 1894, and Model 1895 rifles, along with the lever-action Model 1887/1901 shotgun, the pump-action Model 1890 rifle, and the pump-action Model 1893/Model 1897 shotgun.

== Winchester lever-action repeating rifles ==
=== Model 1866 ===
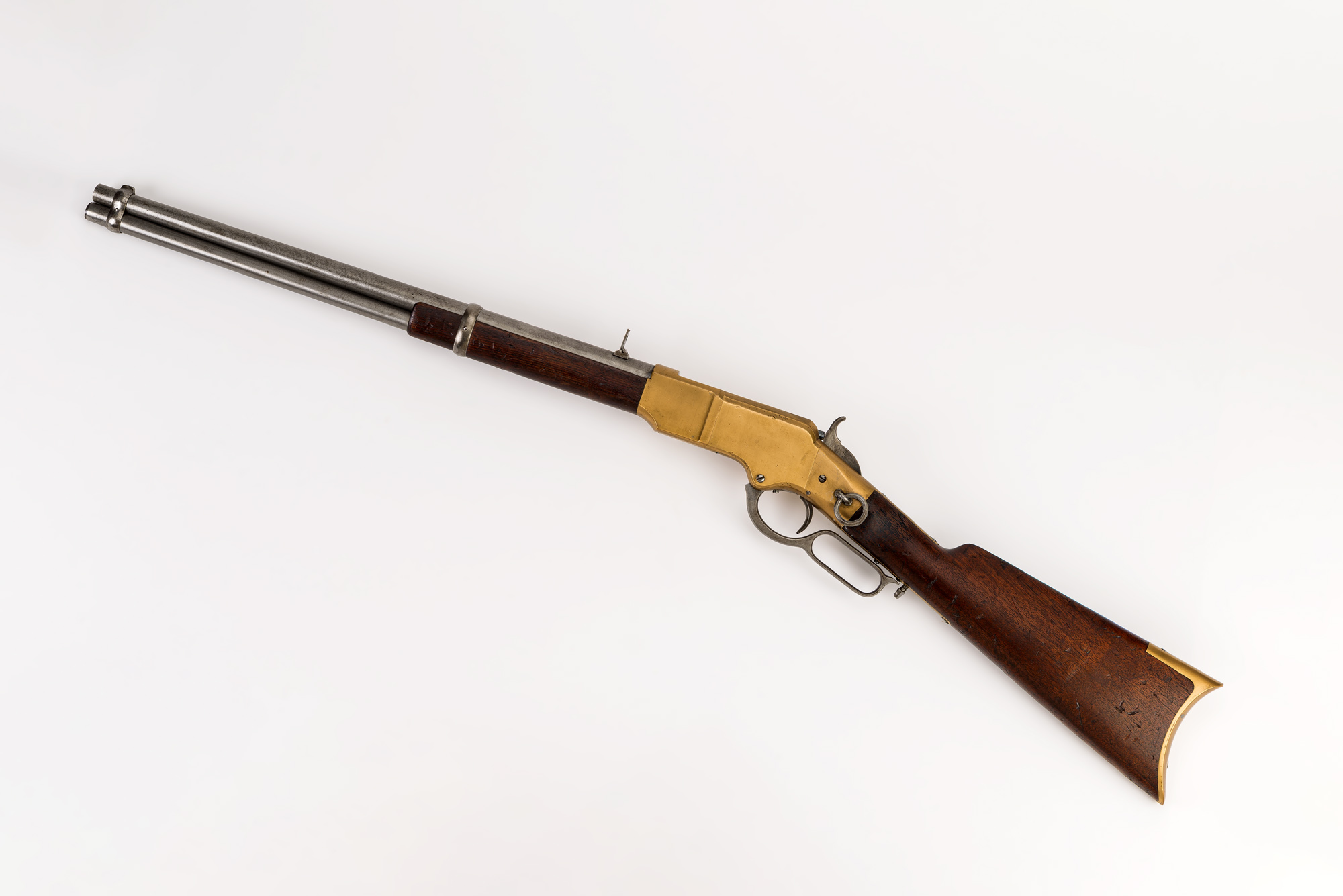
Mod. 1866 Yellow boy

The first Winchester rifle – the Winchester Model 1866 – was originally chambered for the rimfire .44 Henry. Nicknamed the "Yellow Boy" because of its receiver of a bronze/brass alloy called gunmetal, it was famous for its rugged construction and lever-action "repeating rifle" mechanism that allowed the user to fire a number of shots before having to reload. Nelson King's improved patent remedied flaws in the Henry rifle by incorporating a loading gate on the side of the frame and integrating a round, sealed magazine that was partially covered by a forestock.

A 27 in (69 cm) "musket" version was also produced, primarily for military users. (Musket was a term that, at the time, denoted a full-length military-style stock, not to be confused with a true smoothbore musket). Spike bayonet and as well sword bayonet can be mounted on the gun barrel.

France purchased 6,000 Model 1866 rifles along with 4.5 million .44 Henry cartridges during the Franco-Prussian War. The Ottoman Empire purchased 45,000 Model 1866 rifles and 5,000 carbines in 1870 and 1871. These rifles were used in the 1877 Russo-Turkish War, causing much surprise when outnumbered Turks at the Siege of Plevna inflicted many times more casualties than their opponents armed with single-shot Krnka and Berdan rifles. The effect of the 1866 at the siege at Plevna sparked a renewed interest in the adoption of repeating rifles for several European countries.

The Swiss Army initially selected the Model 1866 to replace their existing single-shot Milbank-Amsler rifles. However, ensuing political pressure to adopt a domestic design resulted in the Vetterli Model 1867, a bolt-action design utilizing a copy of the Winchester's tubular magazine, being adopted instead.

Due to public demand, the Model 1866 continued to be manufactured and sold until 1899, mainly because they were less expensive than the later steel-framed centerfire models.

=== Model 1873 ===
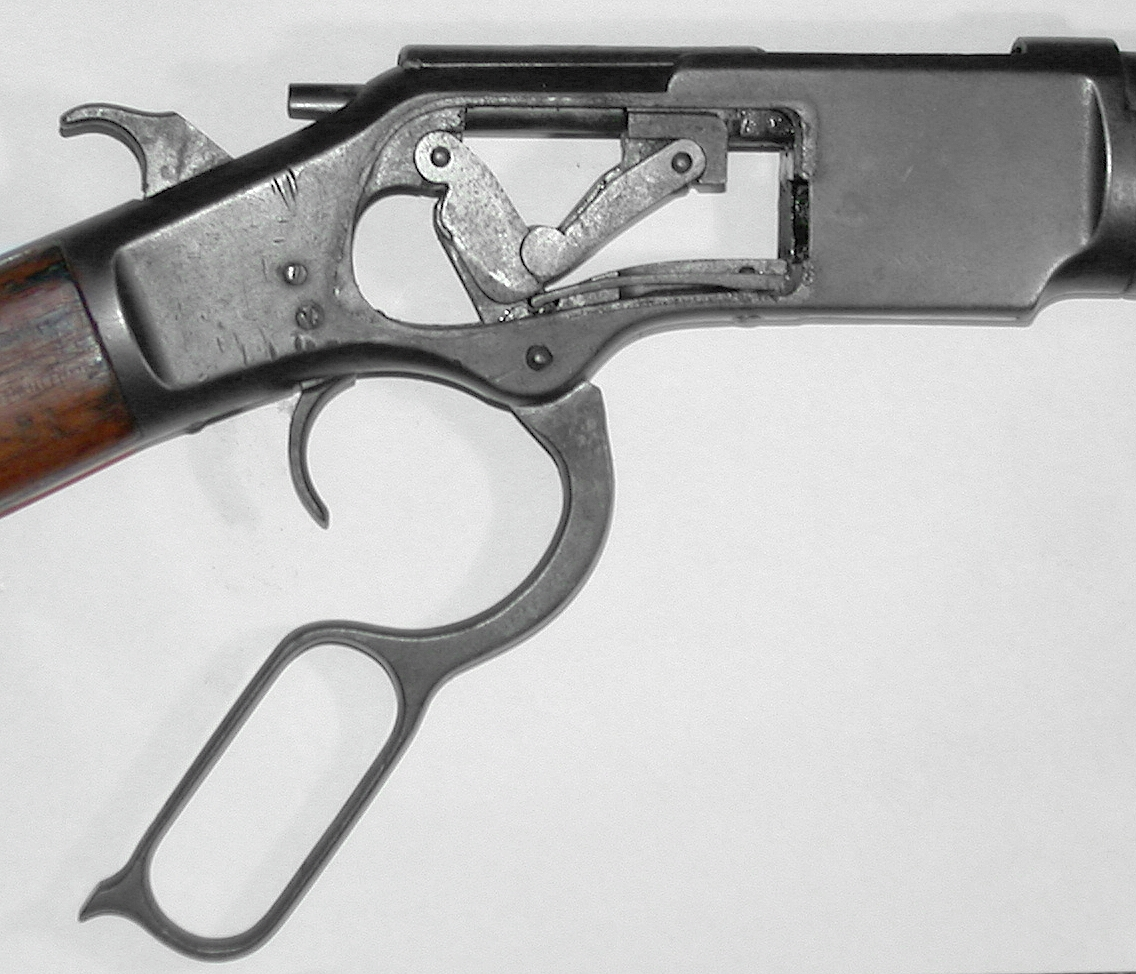
Winchester 73 toggle-link action

The Model 1873 was one of the most successful Winchester rifles of its day, with Winchester marketing it as "The Gun That Won the West". Still an icon in the modern day, it was manufactured between 1873 and 1923. It was originally chambered for the .44-40 cartridge, which was the first centerfire cartridge manufactured by Winchester and which became immensely popular. The 1873 was later produced chambered for .38-40 and .32-20, both of which would become popular handgun cartridges of the day, allowing users to carry just one type of ammunition. The Model 1873 was produced in three variations: a 24-inch (61 cm) barrel rifle, a 20-inch (51 cm) barrel carbine, and a 30-inch (76 cm) "musket", which was aimed at military contracts and only made up less than 5% of production. The standard rifle-length version was most popular in the 19th century, although Winchester would make rifles to order in any configuration the customer wished, including longer barrels or baby carbines with barrels as short as 12 inches (30 cm), octagonal-shaped barrels, color case-hardened receivers and fancy engraving.

The original Model 1873 was never offered in the military revolver .45 Colt cartridge, but a number of modern reproductions are chambered for the round.

The model was voted as the state gun of Idaho in a 2026 election.

==== One of One Thousand ====
To both celebrate and enhance the Model 1873's prestige, Winchester established a coveted "One of One Thousand" grade in 1875. Barrels producing unusually small groupings during test-firing were fitted to rifles with set triggers and a special finish. Marked "One of One Thousand", they sold for a then pricey $100 (Worth about $3,000 as of 2024). A popular 1950 Western starring James Stewart, Winchester '73, was based on the coveted gun. Promotions included a search for "One of One Thousand" rifles by Universal Studios, with advertisements in sporting magazines and posters in sporting goods stores.

A second grade of Model 1873 barrels producing above average accuracy were fitted to rifles marked "One of One Hundred", and sold for $20 over list. Approximately 136 "One of One Thousand" Model 1873s were sold, and only eight "One of One Hundred" rifles.

In all, over 720,000 Model 1873s were produced up until 1923. With a return to popularity due to present-day Cowboy action shooting, '73 rifles and carbines of a high quality have been made in Italy by Uberti, encouraging a return to production under license from the Olin company in 2013, joining the Model 1892 and the Model 1894 being manufactured in Japan by the Miroku Corporation for FN/Browning. Nearly faithful in design to the original, including the trigger disconnect safety, sliding dustcover, and a crescent-shaped buttplate, it incorporates two safety improvements: a firing pin block preventing it from moving forward unless the trigger is pulled, and a cartridge carrier modification to eject used casings away from the shooter.

In 2014, a weathered Model 1873 was found leaning against a tree in Great Basin National Park. It became known as the Forgotten Winchester and sparked media interest because of the mystery about who left it there and why they never came back for it.

=== Model 1876 ===
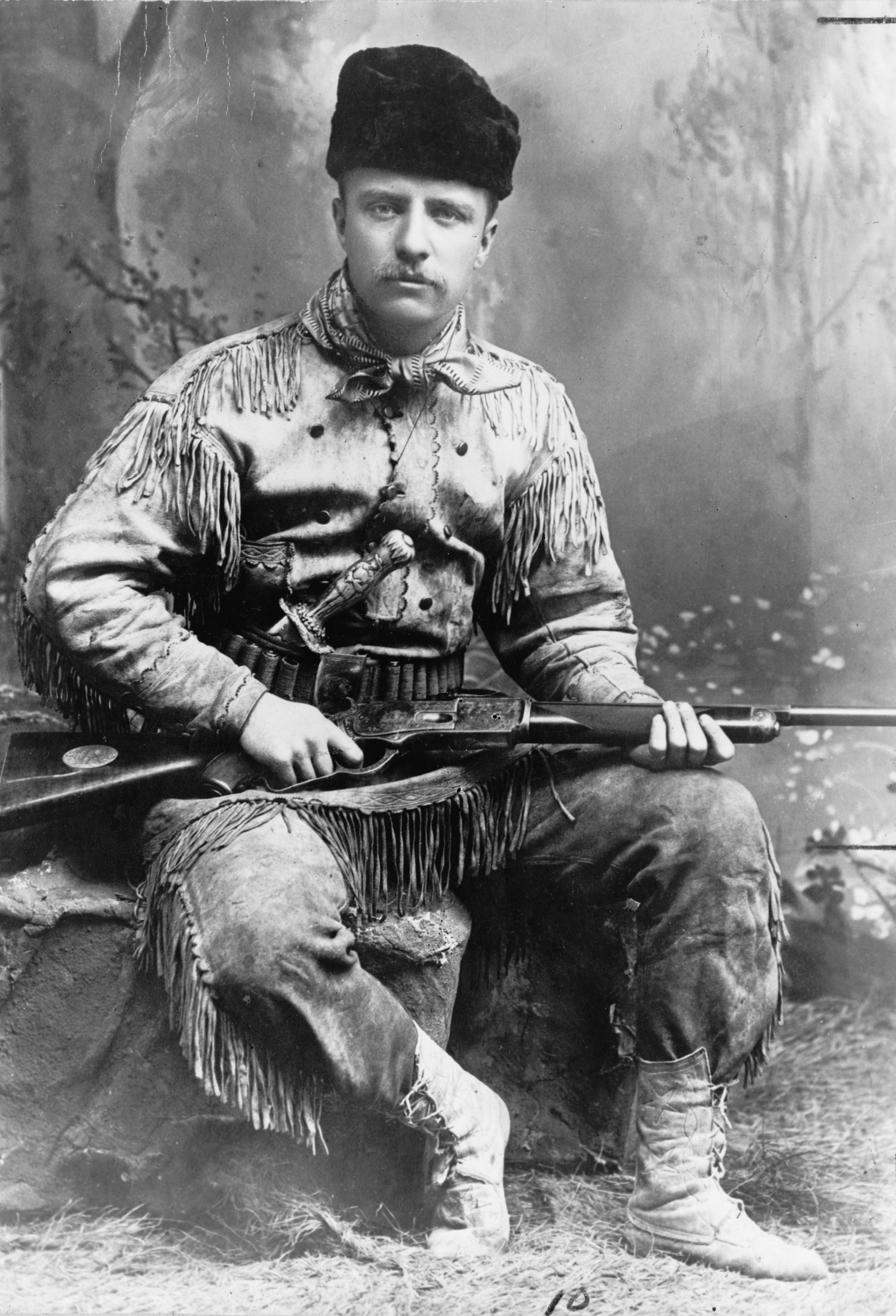
Theodore Roosevelt with his engraved Model 1876

The Winchester Model 1876, or Centennial Model, was a heavier-framed rifle than the Models 1866 and 1873, chambered for full-powered centerfire rifle cartridges suitable for big-game hunting, rather than the handgun-sized rimfire and centerfire rounds of its predecessors. While similar in design to the 1873, the 1876 was actually based on a prototype 1868 lever-action rifle that was never commercially produced by Winchester.

Introduced to celebrate the American Centennial Exposition, the Model 1876 earned a reputation as a durable and powerful hunting rifle. Four versions were produced: a 22-inch (56 cm) barrel Carbine, a 26-inch (66 cm) barrel Express Rifle with a half-length magazine, a 28-inch (71 cm) barrel Sporting Rifle, and a 32-inch (81 cm) barrel Musket. Standard rifles had a blued finish while deluxe models were casehardened. Collectors identify a first model with no dust cover, a second model with a dust cover rail fastened by a screw, and a third model with an integral dust cover. Total production was 63,871 including 54 One of One Thousand Model 1876s and only seven of the One of One Hundred grade.

Originally chambered for the new .45-75 Winchester Centennial cartridge (designed to replicate the .45-70 ballistics in a shorter case), the Model 1876 also had versions in .40-60 Winchester, .45-60 Winchester and .50-95 Express; the '76 in the latter chambering is the only repeater known to have been in widespread use by professional buffalo hunters. The Canadian North-West Mounted Police used the '76 in .45-75 as a standard long arm for many years with 750 rifles purchased for the force in 1883; the Mountie-model '76 carbine was also issued to the Texas Rangers. Theodore Roosevelt used an engraved, pistol-gripped half-magazine '76 during his early hunting expeditions in the West and praised it. A '76 was also found in the possession of Apache warrior Geronimo after his surrender in 1886.

The Model 1876 toggle-link action receiver was too short to handle popular big-game cartridges, including the .45-70, and production ceased in 1897, as big-game hunters preferred the Model 1886 action chambered for longer and more powerful cartridges.

=== Model 1886 ===
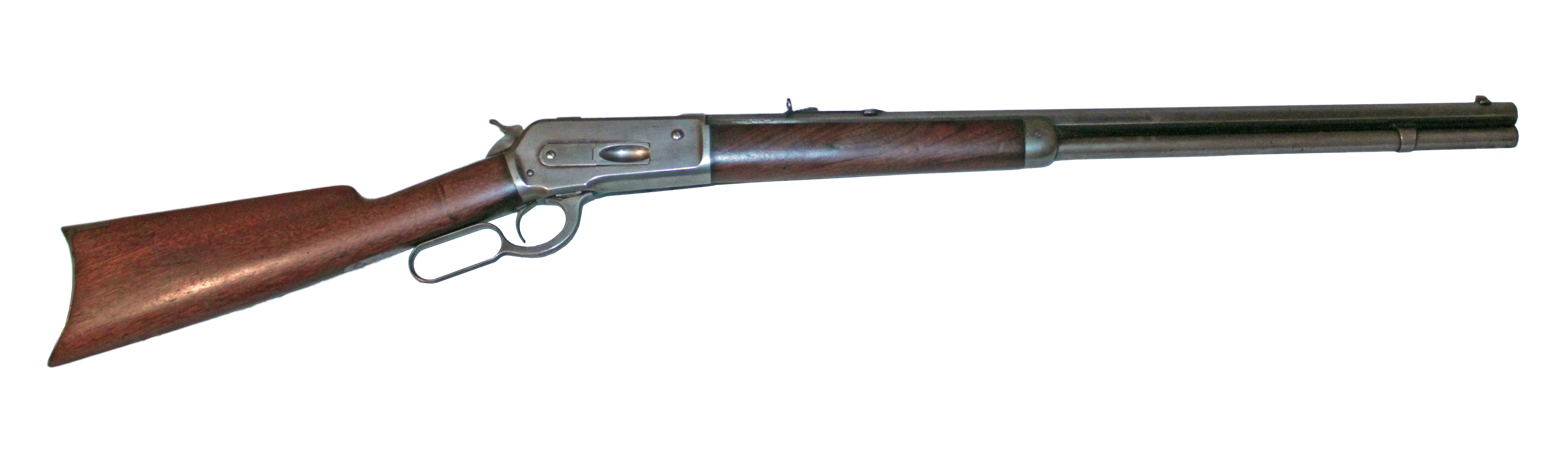
Winchester Model 1886

The Model 1886 continued the trend towards chambering heavier rounds and had an all-new and considerably stronger locking-block action than the toggle-link Model 1876. It was designed by John Moses Browning, who had a long and profitable relationship with Winchester from the 1880s to the early 1900s. William Mason made some improvements to Browning's original design. In many respects, the Model 1886 was a true American express rifle, as it could be chambered in the more powerful black powder cartridges of the day, such as the .45-70 Government, long a Winchester goal. The 1886 proved capable of handling not only the .45 Gov't but also .45-90 and the huge .50-110 Express "buffalo" cartridges, and in 1903 was chambered for the smokeless high-velocity .33 Winchester. In 1935, Winchester introduced a slightly modified M1886 as the Model 71, chambered for the more powerful .348 Winchester cartridge.

=== Model 1892 ===
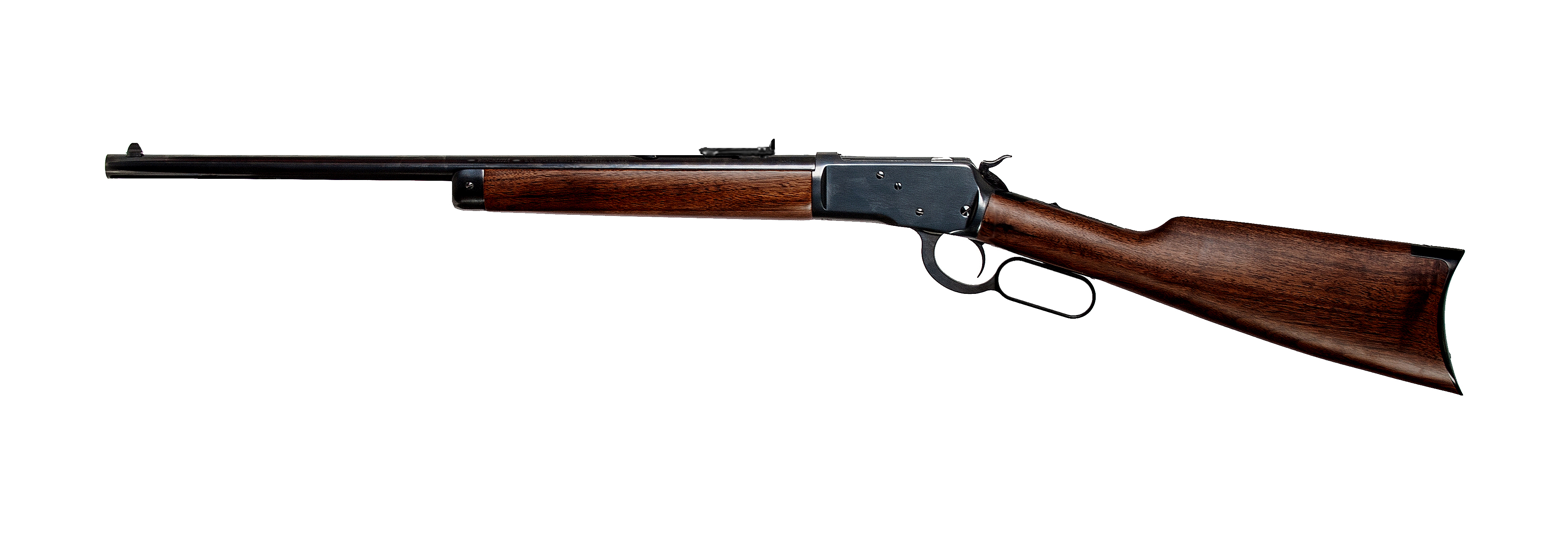
Winchester Model 1892

In order to compete with newer Marlin offerings, Winchester returned to its roots with the Model 1892, which was chambered for the same low-pressure cartridges as the Model 1873. The Model 1892 incorporates a much-stronger Browning action that was a scaled-down version of the Model 1886. It was also a much lighter rifle than the 1873 model, with which it was sold concurrently for over twenty years, for the same price.

A total of 1,004,675 Model 1892 rifles were made by Winchester, and it was exported internationally, becoming very popular in South America and Australasia. Although Winchester stopped manufacture in 1941, today versions are still being made by the Brazilian arms maker Amadeo Rossi, and by Chiappa Firearms, an Italian maker. In its modern form, using updated materials and production techniques, the Model 1892's action is strong enough to chamber high-pressure handgun rounds, such as .357 Magnum, .44 Magnum, and .454 Casull. The Winchester '92 was often used in Hollywood Western movies and TV shows out of its correct period, achieving some fame as a 'cowboy' lever action, although it was historically too late for that.

=== Model 1894 ===
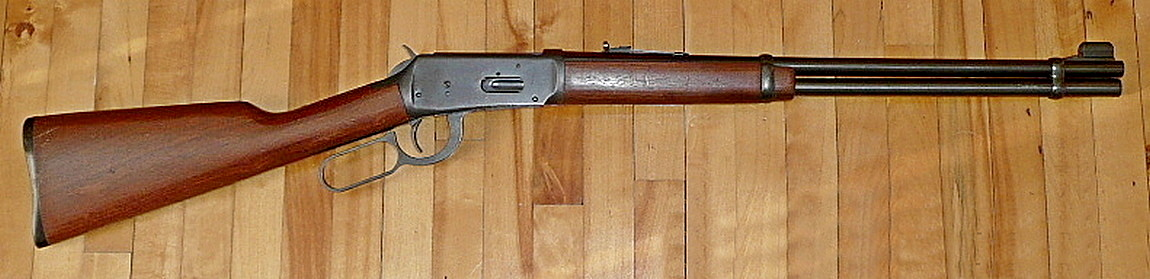
Winchester Model 1894

The John Browning–designed Winchester Model 1894 is the most prevalent of the Winchester repeating rifles. The Model 1894 was first chambered for the .32-40 and .38-55 cartridges, and later, a variety of calibers such as .25-35 WCF, .30-30, and .32 Winchester Special. Winchester was the first company to manufacture a civilian rifle chambered for the new smokeless propellants, and although delays prevented the .30-30 cartridge from appearing on the shelves until 1895, it remained the first commercially available smokeless powder round for the North American consumer market. Though it was initially too expensive for most shooters, the Model 1894 went on to become one of the best-selling hunting rifles of all time – it had the distinction of being the first sporting rifle to sell over one million units, ultimately selling over seven million before U.S.-production was discontinued in 2006. The Winchester .30-30 configuration is practically synonymous with "deer rifle" in the United States. In the early 20th century, the rifle's designation was abbreviated to "Model 94", as was done with all older Winchester designs still in production (for example, Model 97, Model 12, etc.).

=== Model 1895 ===
The Winchester Model 1895 has the distinction of being the first Winchester lever-action rifle to load from an internal box magazine instead of from an internal tube magazine under the barrel. This allowed the Model 1895 to be chambered for military cartridges with spitzer (pointed) projectiles, and the rifle was used by the armed forces of a number of nations including the United States, Great Britain, and Imperial Russia. The Russian production models could also be loaded using charger clips, a feature not found on any other lever-action rifle. Calibers included .30-40 Krag (.30 US or .30 Army), .303 British, .30-03 Springfield, .30-06 Springfield, 7.62×54mmR, and .405 Winchester. Theodore Roosevelt used a Model 1895 in .405 on African safaris and called it his "medicine gun" for lions. In 1908, the 1895 Winchester became the first commercially produced sporting rifle chambered in .30-06 (then called ".30 Gov't 06").

=== Model 88 ===
Winchester Model 88
- Place of origin: United States

Production history
- Produced: 1955–1973
- No. built: Approximately 284,000
- Variants: Model 88 Carbine

Specifications
- Mass: 6.53 lb (2.96 kg)
- Length: 42.1 in (1,070 mm)
- Barrel length: 22 in (560 mm)
- Cartridge: .243 Winchester.284 Winchester.308 Winchester.358 Winchester
- Action: Lever action, rotating bolt
- Feed system: Four or five-round detachable box magazine

Introduced in 1955, 60 years after Winchester's last all-new lever-action design, the Model 88 was unlike any previous lever-action. A short-throw lever operated a three-lug rotating bolt and rounds were fed vertically from a detachable box magazine: in effect, it was lever-operated bolt action. These features in a lever-action permitted the use of high-powered modern short-case cartridges with spitzer bullets: .243 Winchester, .284 Winchester, .308 Winchester (essentially 7.62x51mm NATO), and .358 Winchester. The Model 88 was discontinued in 1973 and is the third best-selling lever-action rifle in Winchester's history, following only the M1894 and M1892. The later Sako Finnwolf and Browning BLR have similar actions. The Model 88 Carbine was offered with a 19-inch (48 cm) barrel.

=== Model 9422 ===
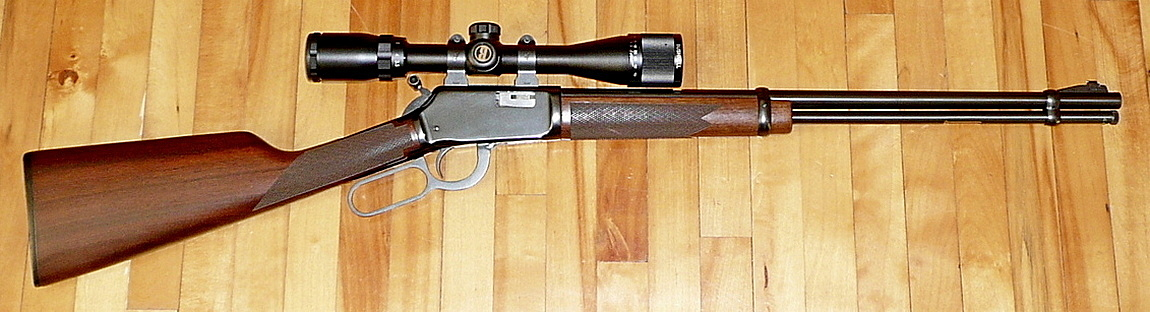
Winchester 9422 XTR .22 WMR with rifle scope

Winchester's Model 9422 was introduced in 1972. It was designed to capture the image of the traditional lever-actions with exposed hammer, straight grip, tube magazine and barrel bands. Unlike older Winchester lever actions it came grooved for scope mounting. It was offered in .22 Long Rifle and .22 WMR, and was priced at the high end of the .22 LR sporting rifle market.

The 9422 action design was original and extremely reliable. The feed system handled the cartridge from the magazine to the breech face by its rim, and the slide cammed the rear of the breechblock up into the locking recess. A concealed polymer buffer above the breech gave a firm-feeling lockup and a very positive unlocking motion.

The 9422 had worldwide appeal to customers raised on Western fiction and to parents looking for a way to introduce their children to shooting. Over the course of production, a higher-finished model called the 9422 XTR, a .17 rimfire model, and several commemorative models were offered. Production ended in 2005.

== New production ==
In 2013, Winchester brought back the Model 1873, manufactured under license from the Olin company by FN/Browning in the Kōchi Prefecture of Japan by the Miroku Corporation. It joins the Model 1892 and Model 1894 as the third classic Winchester rifle model to be reintroduced. The new 1873 model is available with a 20 or 24 in (51 or 61 cm) barrel, either round or octagonal, and a chambering of .357 Magnum/.38 Special, .44-40 Winchester, or .45 Colt. It is nearly identical in design to the originals including the trigger disconnect safety, sliding dustcover, and crescent-shaped buttplate, but with two notable exceptions. An additional safety mechanism, a firing pin block that prevents it from moving forward unless the trigger is pulled, was integrated, and the cartridge carrier was changed to eject used casings away from the shooter. The fixed, tubular magazine has a maximum capacity of fourteen rounds (thirteen for .44 and .45 caliber rifles).

== Users ==
- Argentina
- Bolivia
- Brazil
- Canada
- Chile
- Costa Rica
- Kingdom of Dahomey
- Dominican Republic
- El Salvador
- Ethiopian Empire
- France
- Great Britain
- Guatemala
- Haiti
- Kingdom of Hawaii
- Honduras
- Empire of Japan
- Mexico
- Morocco
- Mthwakazi
- Ottoman Empire
- Peru
- Qing Empire
- Siam
- South Africa
- United States
- Wadai Empire
- Wassoulou Empire
- Yeke Kingdom
- Sultanate of Zanzibar

== See also ==
- Antique firearms
- Evans repeating rifle
- List of rifle cartridges
- List of Winchester models
- Pistola Herval
- Mare's Leg
- Winchester Repeating Arms Company
