= .40-60 Winchester =

Rifle cartridge

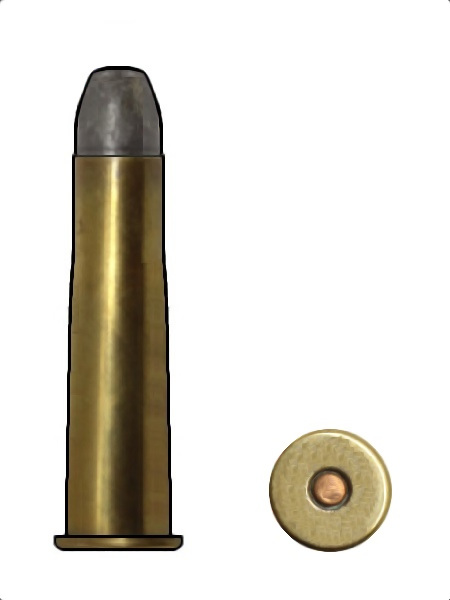
- Type: Rifle
- Place of origin: United States

Production history
- Designed: 1884
- Manufacturer: Winchester Repeating Arms Company
- Produced: 1884–1934

Specifications
- Parent case: .45-70
- Case type: Rimmed, bottleneck
- Bullet diameter: 0.405 inches (10.3 mm)
- Case length: 1.89 inches (48 mm)

Ballistic performance
Bullet mass/type	Velocity	Energy
210 gr (14 g) Lead	1,960 ft/s (600 m/s)	1,792 ft⋅lbf (2,430 J)
- Test barrel length: 30 inches (760 mm); Source(s): Phil Sharpe

The .40-60 Winchester (.40-60 WCF) or 10.3x48mmR is a rimmed, bottlenecked centerfire rifle cartridge designed for use in lever-action rifles by Winchester Repeating Arms Company in 1884.

== Description and performance ==
The .40-60 Winchester is a centerfire rifle cartridge intended for 19th-century big-game hunting. Nomenclature of the era indicated the .40-60 cartridge contained a 0.40-inch (10 mm) diameter bullet with 60 grains (3.9 g) of gunpowder.

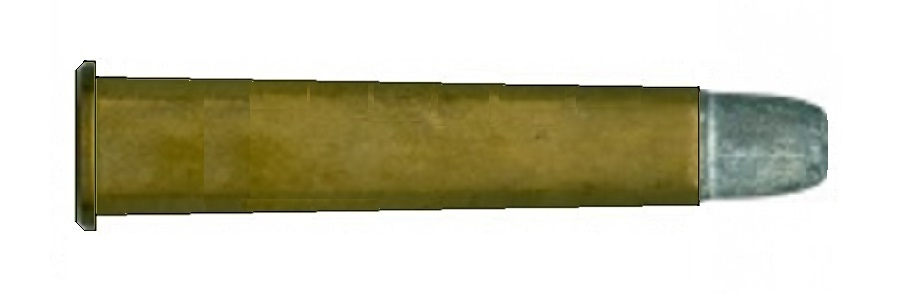
The .40-60 WCF.

Winchester Repeating Arms Company necked down the .45-60 Winchester cartridge to hold a bullet with improved ballistics for the Winchester Model 1876 rifle. The lever-action Model 1876's advantage of faster loading for subsequent shots was eclipsed two years later by the stronger and smoother Winchester Model 1886 action capable of handling longer cartridges with heavier bullets.

The .40-60 and similarly short cartridges designed for the Model 1876 rifle faded into obsolescence as 20th-century hunters preferred more powerful smokeless powder loadings of cartridges designed for stronger rifles. Winchester production of .40-60 cartridges ended during the Great Depression.

== Dimensions ==
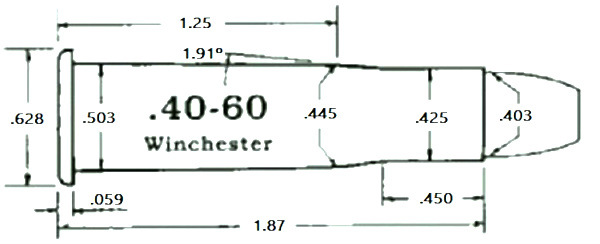

== See also ==
- List of Winchester Center Fire cartridges
- List of rimmed cartridges
- List of cartridges by caliber
- List of rifle cartridges
- .40 S&W
- 10mm Auto
- .41 Action Express
