= .45-60 Winchester =

Rifle cartridge

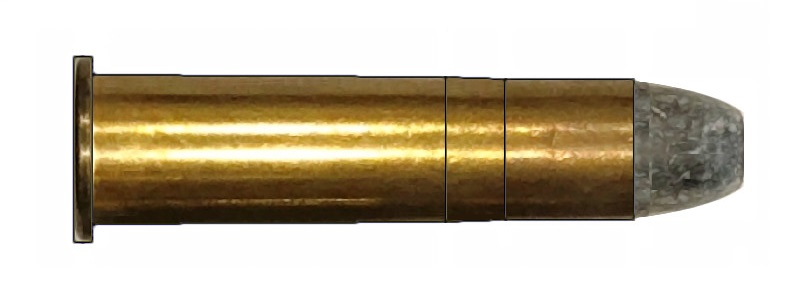
- Type: Rifle
- Place of origin: United States

Production history
- Designed: 1879
- Manufacturer: Winchester Repeating Arms Company
- Produced: 1879–1935

Specifications
- Parent case: .45-70
- Case type: Rimmed, tapered
- Bullet diameter: 0.458 inches (11.6 mm)
- Case length: 1.89 inches (48 mm)
- Maximum pressure (CIP): 27,850 psi (192.0 MPa)

Ballistic performance
Bullet mass/type	Velocity	Energy
300 gr (19 g) Lead	1,390 ft/s (420 m/s)	1,287 ft⋅lbf (1,745 J)
- Test barrel length: 30 inches (76 cm); Source(s): Phil Sharpe

The .45-60 Winchester / 11.6x48mmR is a centerfire rifle cartridge intended for 19th-century big-game hunting. Nomenclature of the era indicated the .45-60 cartridge contained a 0.45-inch (11.43 mm) diameter bullet with 60 grains (3.89 g) of black powder. Winchester Repeating Arms Company shortened the .45-70 Government cartridge to operate through the Winchester Model 1876 rifle's lever-action.

The Colt Lightning Carbine and the Whitney Arms Company's Kennedy lever-action rifle were also chambered for the .45-60. These early rifles' advantage of faster loading for subsequent shots was soon eclipsed by the stronger and smoother Winchester Model 1886 action capable of handling longer cartridges including the popular full length .45-70. The .45-60 and similarly short cartridges designed for the Model 1876 rifle faded into obsolescence as 20th-century hunters preferred more powerful smokeless powder loadings of cartridges designed for stronger rifles. Winchester production of .45-60 cartridges ended during the Great Depression.

== Dimensions ==
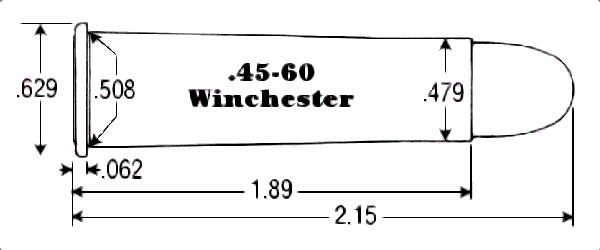

== See also ==
- List of Winchester Center Fire cartridges
- Table of handgun and rifle cartridges
- List of cartridges by caliber
- List of rifle cartridges
- List of rimmed cartridges
- .44-40 Winchester
- .444 Marlin
- .44 Henry
- .450 No 2 Nitro Express
