= Henry rifle =

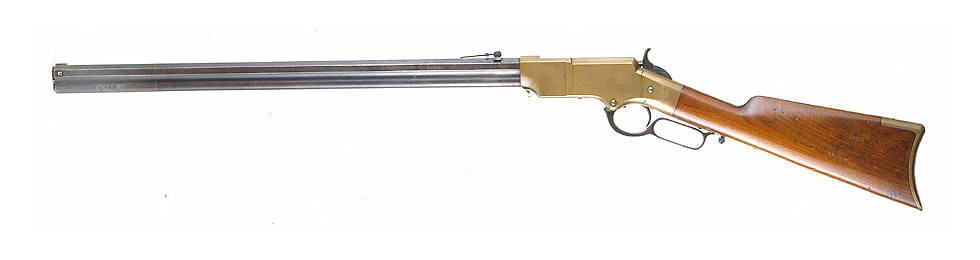
- Type: Lever-action rifle
- Place of origin: United States

Service history
- Used by: United States, Confederate States, Native Americans, Mexico, Poland, Tokugawa Shogunate, Empire of Japan, France, Kanem-Bornu Empire
- Wars: American Civil War, Indian Wars, Second Franco-Mexican War, January Uprising, Boshin War, Satsuma Rebellion, Rabih War, Franco-Prussian War

Production history
- Designer: Benjamin Tyler Henry
- Designed: 1860
- Manufacturer: New Haven Arms Company
- Unit cost: $40 (equivalent to $1,433 in 2025)
- Produced: 1860–1866
- No. built: ~14,000

Specifications
- Mass: 9 lb 4 oz (4.2 kg)
- Length: 44.75 in (113.7 cm)
- Barrel length: 24 in (61 cm)
- Caliber: .44 Henry rimfire
- Action: Breech-loading lever action
- Feed system: 15-round tubular magazine

The Henry repeating rifle is a lever-action tubular magazine rifle. It is famous for having been used at the Battle of the Little Bighorn and having been the basis for the iconic Winchester rifle of the American Wild West.

Designed and introduced by Benjamin Tyler Henry in 1860, the original Henry was a sixteen-shot .44 caliber rimfire breech-loading lever-action rifle. It was produced from 1860 until 1866 in the United States by the New Haven Arms Company. The Henry was adopted in small quantities by the Union in the American Civil War, favored for its greater firepower than the standard-issue carbine. Many later found their way West, notably in the hands of a few of the Sioux and Cheyenne in their defeat of George Armstrong Custer's U.S. Cavalry troops in June 1876.

Modern replicas are produced by A. Uberti and Henry Repeating Arms in .44-40 Winchester and .45 Colt.

== History ==
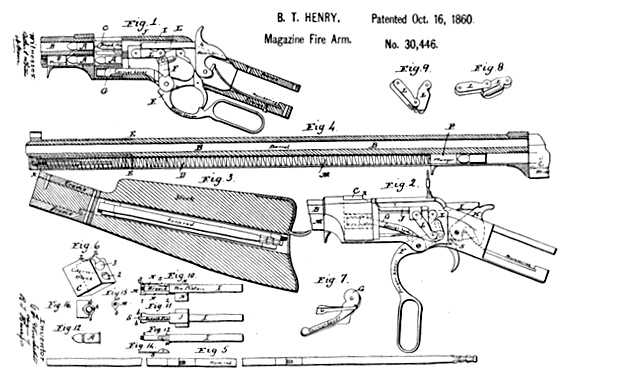
Patent drawing of the Henry rifle

The original Henry rifle was a sixteen-shot .44 caliber rimfire breech-loading lever-action rifle, patented by Benjamin Tyler Henry in 1860 after three years of design work. The Henry was an improved version of the earlier Volition, and later Volcanic. The Henry used copper (later brass) rimfire cartridges with a 216 grain (14.0 gram, 0.490 ounce) bullet over 25 grains (1.6 g, 0.056 oz.) of black powder.

Nine hundred rifles were manufactured between summer and October 1862. At Vicksburg, Lorain Ruggles of Company H, 20th Ohio Volunteer Infantry Regiment and a noted sharpshooter, bought a Henry rifle from his own funds for $65 (equivalent to $1,700 in 2025) from a steamboat captain just prior to the Vicksburg campaign. Production peaked at 290 per month by 1864, bringing the total to 8,000. By the time the run ended in 1866, approximately 14,000 units had been manufactured.

For an American Civil War soldier, owning a Henry rifle was a point of pride. Just 1,731 of the standard rifles were purchased by the government during the war. The Commonwealth of Kentucky purchased a further 50. Over 10,000 of the rifles saw service in the war; a great number were purchased privately by soldiers. The relative fragility of Henrys compared to Spencers hampered their official acceptance. Another weak point for the Henry was that it could not be equipped with a bayonet. Many infantry soldiers purchased Henrys with their reenlistment bounties of 1864. Most of these units were associated with Sherman's Western troops. Only a very small number of original 1860 Henry rifles are known to have been produced with special hardware such as lugs for mounting sword bayonet, making such examples exceptionally rare, and because the rifle’s design lacked a fore‑end and had an exposed magazine tube, adding a bayonet mount required non‑standard factory work, which explains why only a handful of such rifles are known today.

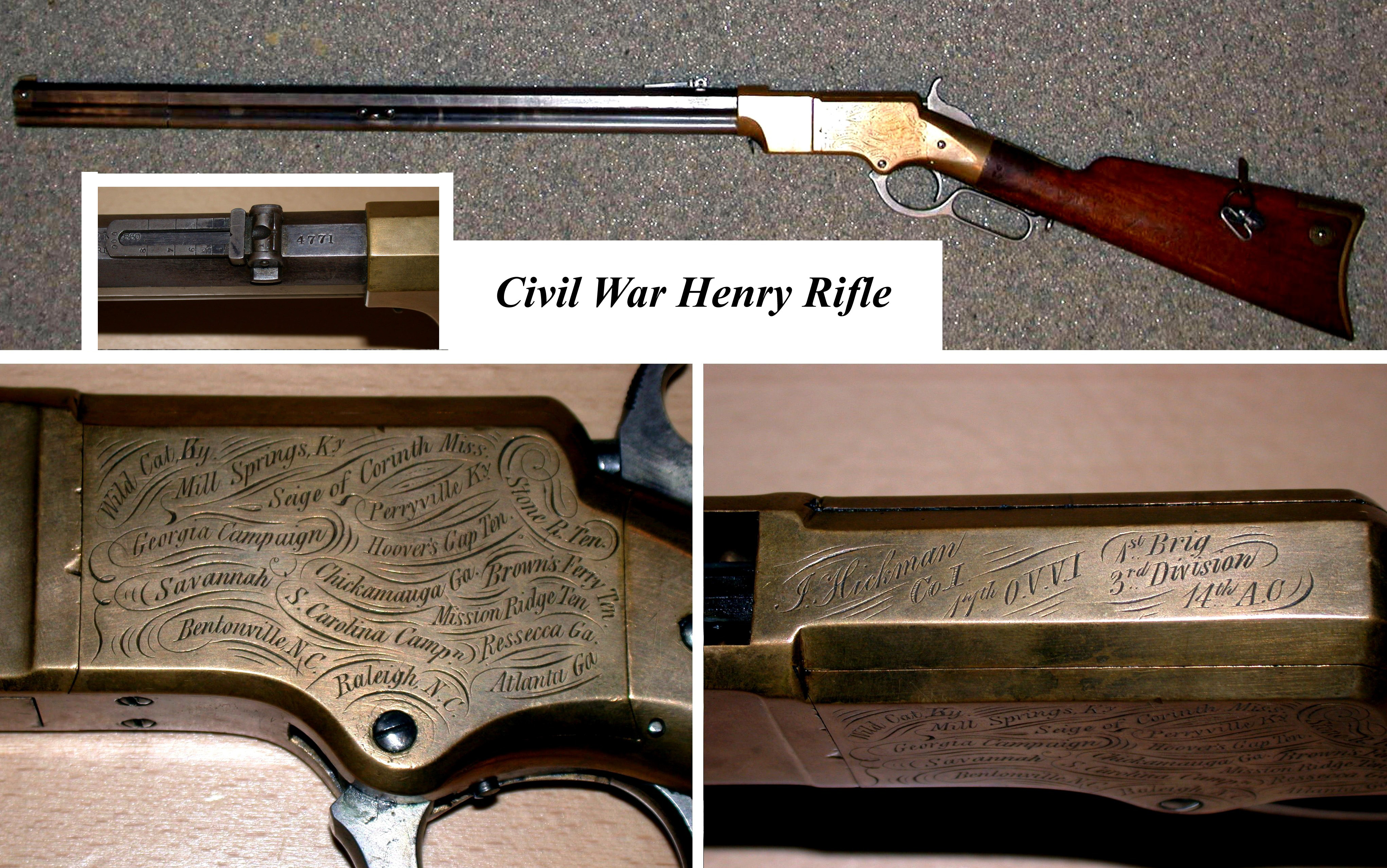
Civil War 1860 Henry rifle

When used correctly, the brass-receiver rifles had an exceptionally high rate of fire compared to any other weapon on the battlefield. Soldiers who saved their pay to buy one believed it would help save their lives. Since tactics had not been developed to take advantage of their firepower, Henrys were frequently used by scouts, skirmishers, flank guards, and raiding parties rather than in regular infantry formations. Confederate Colonel John Mosby, who became infamous for his sudden raids against advanced Union positions, when first encountering the Henry in battle called it "that damned Yankee rifle that can be loaded on Sunday and fired all week." Since then that phrase became associated with the Henry rifle.

Those few Confederate troops who came into possession of captured Henry rifles had little way to resupply the ammunition it used, making its widespread use by Confederate forces impractical. The rifle was, however, known to have been used at least in part by some Confederate units in Louisiana, Texas, and Virginia, as well as the personal bodyguards of Confederate President Jefferson Davis. According to firearms historian Herbert G. Houze, one man armed with a Henry rifle was the equivalent of 14 or 15 men equipped with single-shot guns.

The rifle was utilized by the Lakota, Dakota, Northern Cheyenne and Arapaho extensively during the Battle of the Little Bighorn. Benito Juárez's forces obtained a number of Henry rifles from gun runners during their war against the French. It is theorized that the Henry rifle was used in the January Uprising by Count Jan Kanty Dzialynski in the Battle of Pyzdry and First Battle of Ignacewo. In the memoirs from the epoch, it is reported that Dzialynski had used a 16-shot rifle in combat, but it is more likely that he had used a weapon of his own design. A confirmed user of the Henry rifle in the January Uprising was Paul Garnier d'Aubin, officer of the French 23rd Infantry Regiment.

== Operation ==
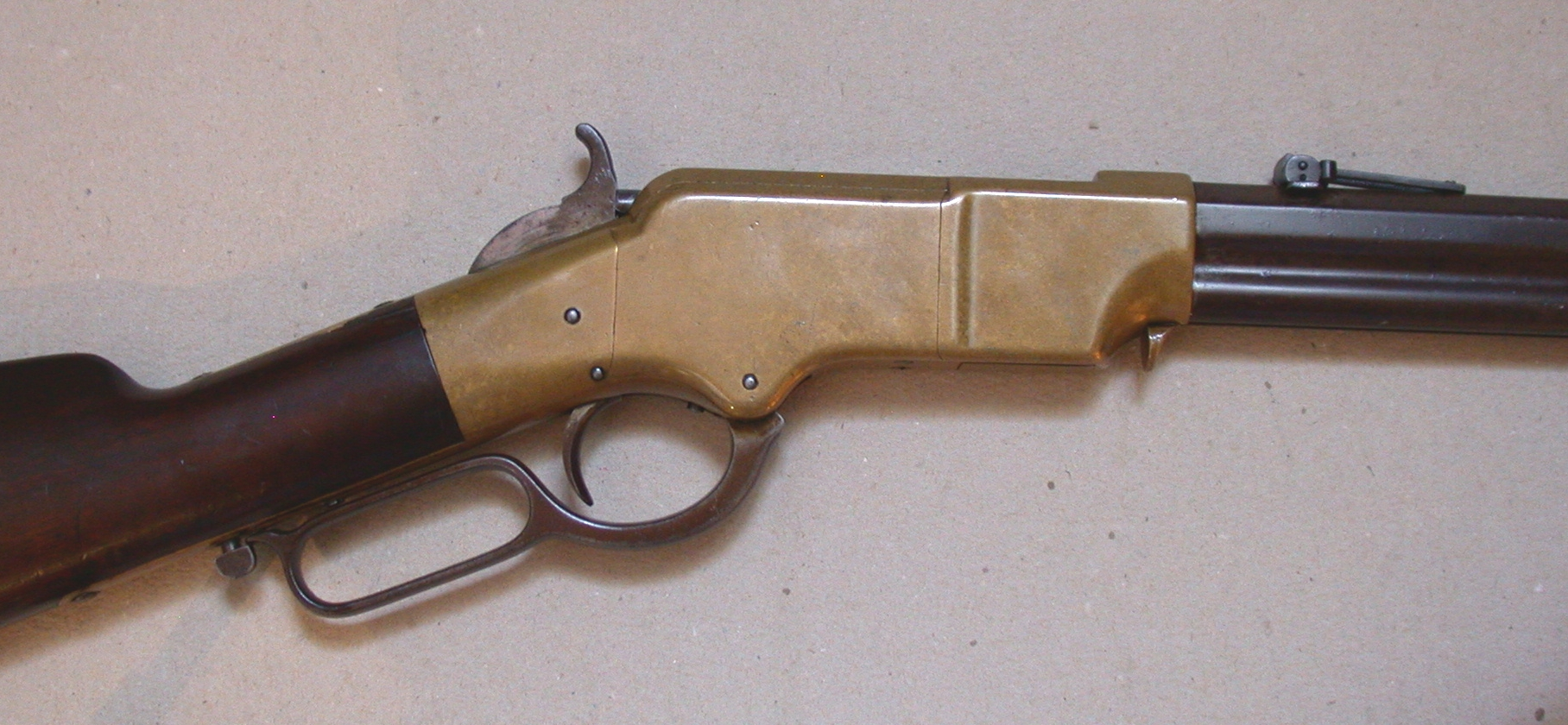
Receiver

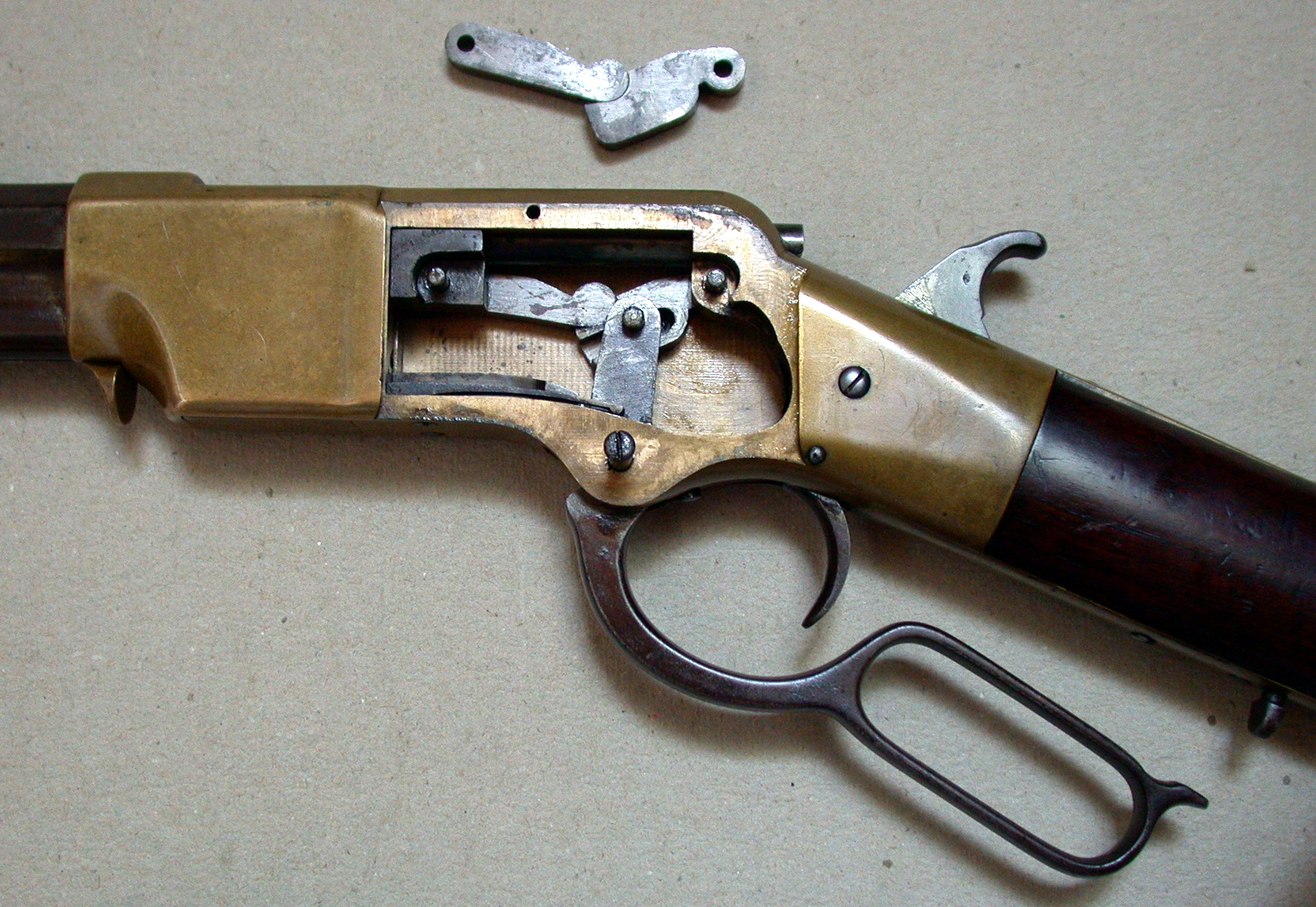
Henry rifle, loading-lever, toggle-joint

The Henry rifle used a .44 caliber cartridge with 26 to 28 grains (1.7 to 1.8 g) of black powder, inside a 15-round tubular magazine. The lever action, on the down-stroke, ejected the spent cartridge from the chamber and cocked the hammer. A spring in the magazine forced the next round into the follower; locking the lever back into position pushed the new cartridge into the chamber and closed the breech. To load the magazine, the shooter moves the cartridge-follower along the slot into the top portion of the magazine-tube and pivots it to the right to open the front-end of the magazine. The top portion of the tube is pivoted back and the spring-loaded follower is released.

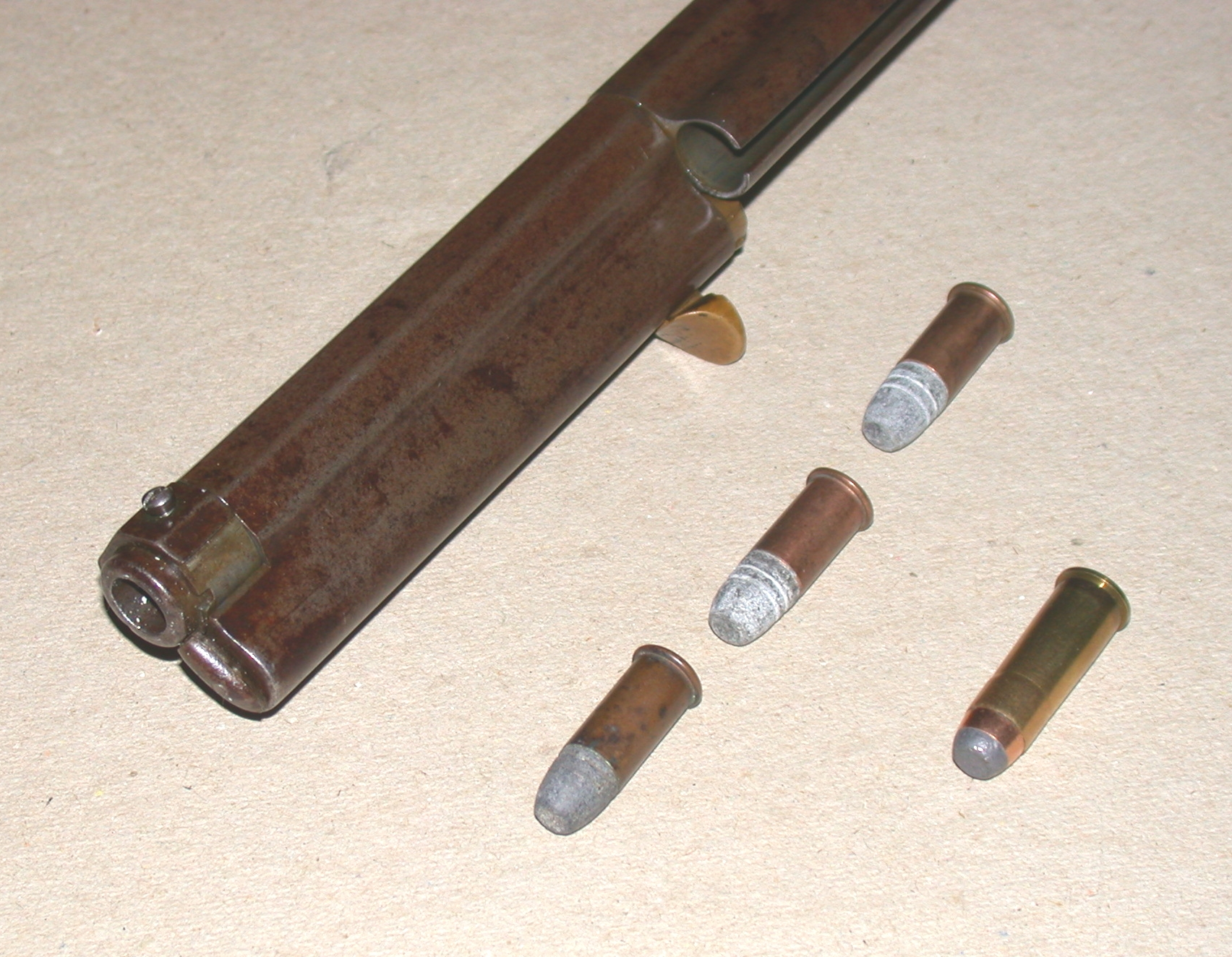
Magazine in loading position, three Henry Flat cartridges, compare with .44-40 WCF round

When not in use, its hammer rested on the cartridge rim; any impact on the back of the exposed hammer could cause a chambered round to fire. If left cocked, the gun remains in the firing position without a safety. The metal tubular magazine also had several drawbacks: its susceptibility to jamming and its tendency to heat up. The open tube meant that dust, mud, and other debris could clog it, leading to malfunction; though modern tests concluded that it was slightly more reliable than the Spencer rifle. Its metal composition can also become hot from repeated shooting, causing difficulty in holding the rifle; though this could be circumvented with proper holding techniques or the use of gloves.

== Legacy ==
While never issued on a large scale, the Henry rifle demonstrated its advantages of rapid fire at close range several times in the American Civil War and later during the wars between the United States and the Plains Indians. Examples include the successes of two Henry-armed Union regiments at the Battle of Franklin against large Confederate attacks, as well as the Henry-armed Sioux and Cheyenne's destruction of the 7th Cavalry at Battle of the Little Bighorn.

Manufactured by the New Haven Arms Company, the Henry rifle evolved into the famous Winchester Model 1866 lever-action rifle. With the introduction of the new Model 1866, the New Haven Arms Company was renamed the Winchester Repeating Arms Company.

== Reproductions ==
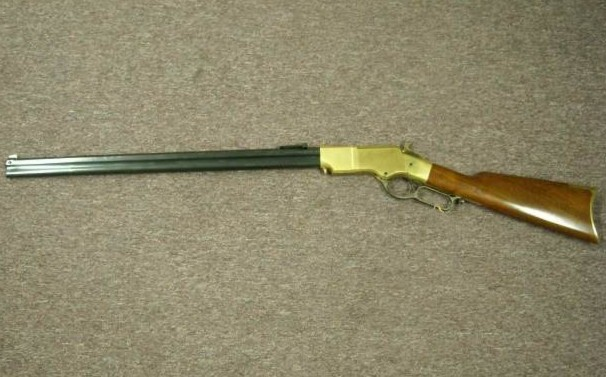
Modern replica Henry rifle

The unrelated Henry Repeating Arms produces a modernized replica of the Henry Model 1860 rifle with brass receiver and American walnut stock, but a modern steel barrel and internal components.

Uberti produces an almost exact copy Henry Model 1860 chambered in .44-40 Winchester or .45 Colt, rather than the original .44 Henry rimfire. Distributed by several companies, these replicas are popular among Cowboy Action Shooters and Civil War reenactors, as well as competition shooters in the North-South Skirmish Association (N-SSA).

== See also ==
- Rifles in the American Civil War
- Colt Lightning rifle
- Colt's New Model revolving rifle
- Spencer repeating rifle
- Winchester rifle
- Evans repeating rifle
