= Spencer repeating rifle =

World's first military metallic-cartridge repeating rifle

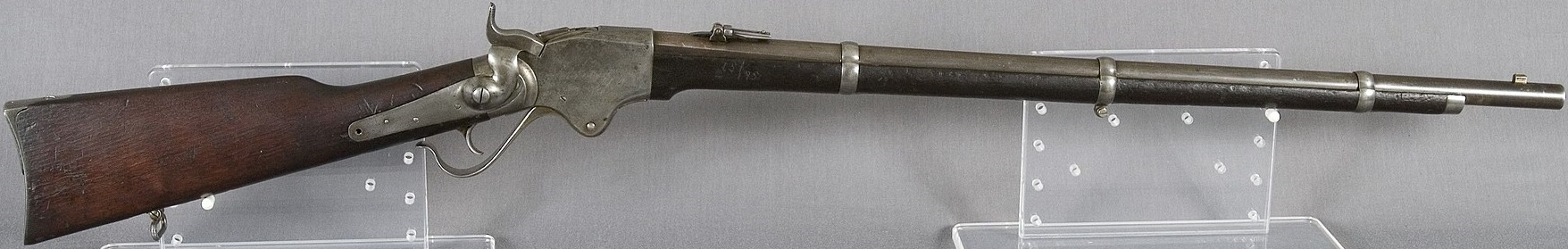
- M1865 Spencer rifle
- Type: Lever-action rifle
- Place of origin: United States

Service history
- Used by: United States; Queen's Own Rifles of Canada; France; Siam; Tokugawa Shogunate; Aizu Domain; Empire of Japan; Empire of Brazil; Argentina; Chile; Bolivia; Peru; Mexico; Kingdom of Dahomey; Qing dynasty; Kanem-Bornu Empire
- Wars: American Civil War; Indian Wars; Fenian Raids; Boshin War; Paraguayan War; Franco-Prussian War; Occupation of Araucanía; Second French intervention in Mexico; War of the Pacific; Argentine Civil Wars; Second Franco-Dahomean War; Federalist Revolution; First Sino-Japanese War; Rabih War

Production history
- Designer: Christopher Spencer
- Designed: 1860
- Manufacturer: Spencer Repeating Rifle Company Burnside Rifle Co; Falisse & Trapmann
- Unit cost: $40 (1861)
- Produced: 1860–1874
- No. built: 200,000 approx.

Specifications
- Length: 47 in (1,200 mm) rifle with 30 inch barrel 39.25 in (997 mm) carbine with 22 inch barrel
- Barrel length: 30 in (760 mm); 22 in (560 mm) (Note: The M-1863 version); 20 in (510 mm) (Note: The M-1865 version)
- Cartridge: .56-56 Rimfire.56-52 Rimfire.56-50 Rimfire.56-50 Centerfire (Brazil).56-46 Rimfire
- Caliber: .52 in (13 mm)
- Action: Manually cocked hammer, lever action
- Rate of fire: 14-20 rounds per minute
- Muzzle velocity: 931 to 1,033 ft/s (284 to 315 m/s)
- Effective firing range: 500 yd (460 m)
- Feed system: 7-round tubular magazine

The Spencer repeating rifle was a 19th-century American lever-action firearm invented by Christopher Spencer. The Spencer carbine was a shorter and lighter version designed for the cavalry.

The Spencer was the world's first military metallic-cartridge repeating rifle, and over 200,000 examples were manufactured in the United States by the Spencer Repeating Rifle Co. and Burnside Rifle Co. between 1860 and 1869.

The Spencer repeating rifle was adopted by the Union Army, especially by the cavalry, during the American Civil War but did not replace the standard issue muzzle-loading rifled muskets in use at the time. Among the early users was George Armstrong Custer.

== Design ==
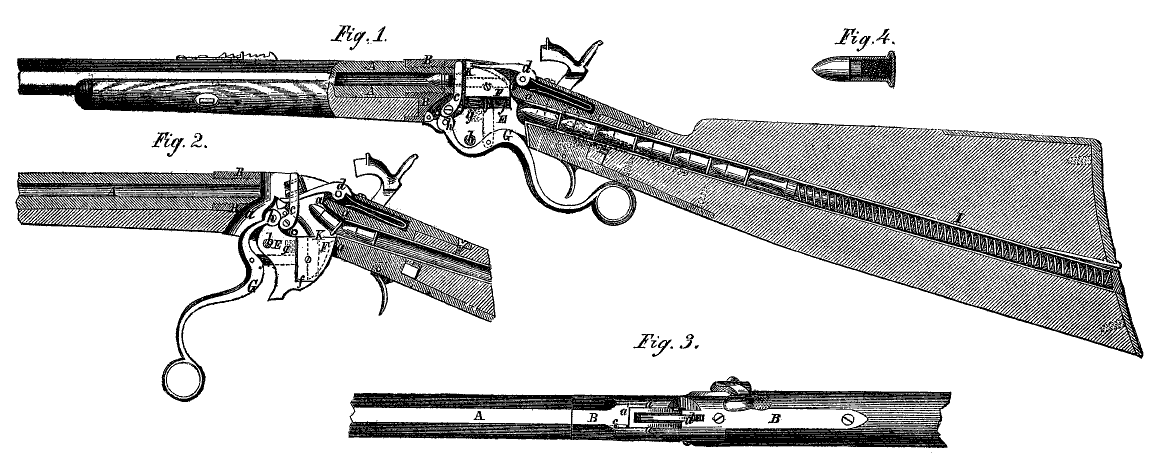
Diagram of the Spencer rifle showing the magazine in the butt. It uses a falling breechblock (F) attached to a carrier (E). Figure 1, shows the breechblock raised. Firing forces are contained by the receiver at the rear of the breechblock.

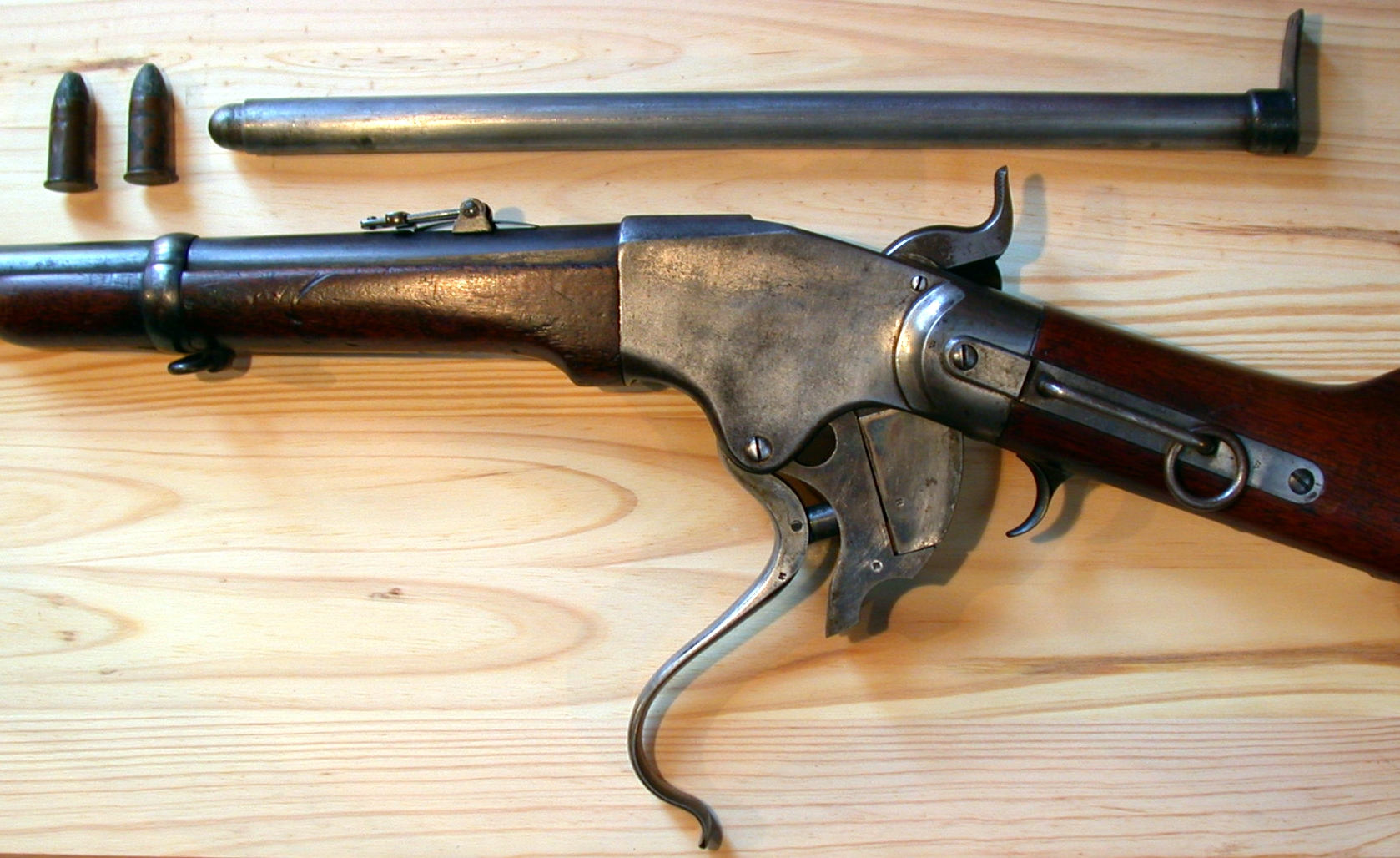
Spencer carbine, magazine tube, and cartridges

The Spencer is a lever-action repeating rifle designed by Christopher Spencer in 1860. It uses a falling breechblock mounted in a carrier. Firing forces are contained by the receiver at the rear of the breechblock. Actuating the loading lever causes the breechblock to fall. Once the breechblock is clear of the receiver, the carrier "rolls" downward, ejecting a spent cartridge from the chamber and collecting a fresh round from the tubular magazine in the buttstock. Closing the lever chambers the new cartridge and the breechblock then rises vertically to close the breech. The hammer of the Spencer needs to be manually cocked after each loading cycle. (Note: This was common in breech-loading firearms of the time. However, in the Henry rifle (of the same time) and most subsequent repeating action designs, the loading cycle also cocks the action ready for firing.) The Spencer was initially produced as a carbine, chambered for the .56-56 Spencer rimfire cartridge.

The tubular magazine of the Spencer holds seven rounds. Originally this was nine rounds, but their number was reduced to reduce the mass of cartridges in the magazine and the risk of their inertia causing an accidental discharge if the weapon was dropped on its butt, or merely from recoil. (Note: This has been a recurrent problem with tube magazines, especially centrefire.) It is filled by rotating the end of the magazine, formed as a lever, by a quarter turn and then withdrawing the magazine tube and spring assembly from the butt plate. Rounds can be loaded individually; however, Erastus Blakeslee invented a cartridge box containing six, ten or thirteen tubes with seven cartridges each. These tubes can be quickly emptied into the magazine tube.

Unlike later cartridge designations, in the Spencer .56-56 the first number referred to the diameter of the case just ahead of the rim, while the second number is the case diameter at the mouth; the actual bullet diameter was .52 in (13 mm). Cartridges were loaded with 45 grains (2.9 g) of black powder, and were also available as .56-52, .56-50, and a wildcat .56-46, a necked down version of the original .56-56. Lugs indicates that the .50 calibre was the standard issue rifle, with a reduced diameter bullet to reduce the recoil and the risk of accidental magazine explosions. Cartridge length was limited by the action size to about 1.75 in (44 mm). Later calibers used a smaller diameter, lighter bullet and larger powder charge to increase power and range over the original .56-56 cartridge, which was almost as powerful as the .58 caliber rifled musket of the time but under-powered by the standards of other early cartridges such as the .50–70 and .45-70.

== Use in the military ==
=== American Civil War ===
When the Spencer rifle was made available for adoption right after the American Civil War broke out, the view by the Department of War Ordnance Department was that soldiers would waste ammunition by firing too rapidly with repeating rifles, and thus denied a government contract for all such weapons. They did, however, encourage the use of breech-loading carbine, which is also single-shot like most firearms of the day but faster to reload than cap and ball muskets, but is shorter than standard rifles and thus more suited to mounted warfare.

More fundamentally, they feared that the Army's logistics train would be unable to provide enough ammunition for the soldiers in the field, as they already had grave difficulty bringing up enough ammunition to sustain armies of tens of thousands of men over distances of hundreds of miles. A weapon able to fire several times as fast would require a vastly expanded logistics train and place great strain on the already overburdened railroads and tens of thousands of more mules, wagons, and wagon train guard detachments. Its unit cost (several times that of a Springfield Model 1861 rifled musket) also stood in the way. However, shortly after the July 1863 Battle of Gettysburg, Spencer was able to gain an audience with President Abraham Lincoln, who invited him to a shooting match and demonstration of the weapon on the lawn of the White House. Lincoln was deeply impressed with the weapon, and ordered Gen. James Wolfe Ripley to adopt it for production. Ripley disobeyed the order and continued to use the old single-shooters, causing him to be replaced as head of the Ordnance Department later that year.

Once adopted by the Union army, the Spencer was the most-widely used carbine in the North, with 94,196 Spencer rifles purchased by the Ordnance Department between 1 January 1861 and 30 June 1866. The Confederates occasionally captured some of these guns and their ammunition, but, as they were unable to manufacture the cartridges because of their dire copper shortage, their utilization of the weapons was limited.

Notable early instances of use included the Battle of Hoover's Gap (where Colonel John T. Wilder's "Lightning Brigade" of mounted infantry effectively demonstrated the firepower of repeaters), and the Gettysburg campaign, where two regiments of the Michigan Brigade (under Brigadier General George Armstrong Custer) carried them at the Battle of Hanover and at East Cavalry Field.

As the war progressed, Spencers were carried by a number of Union cavalry and mounted infantry regiments and provided the Union army with a firepower advantage over their Confederate opponents. At the Battle of Nashville, 9,000 mounted infantrymen armed with the Spencer, under the command of Maj. Gen. James H. Wilson, chief of cavalry for the Military Division of the Mississippi, rode around Gen. John Bell Hood's left flank and attacked from the rear.

President Lincoln's assassin John Wilkes Booth was armed with a Spencer carbine at the time he was captured and killed.

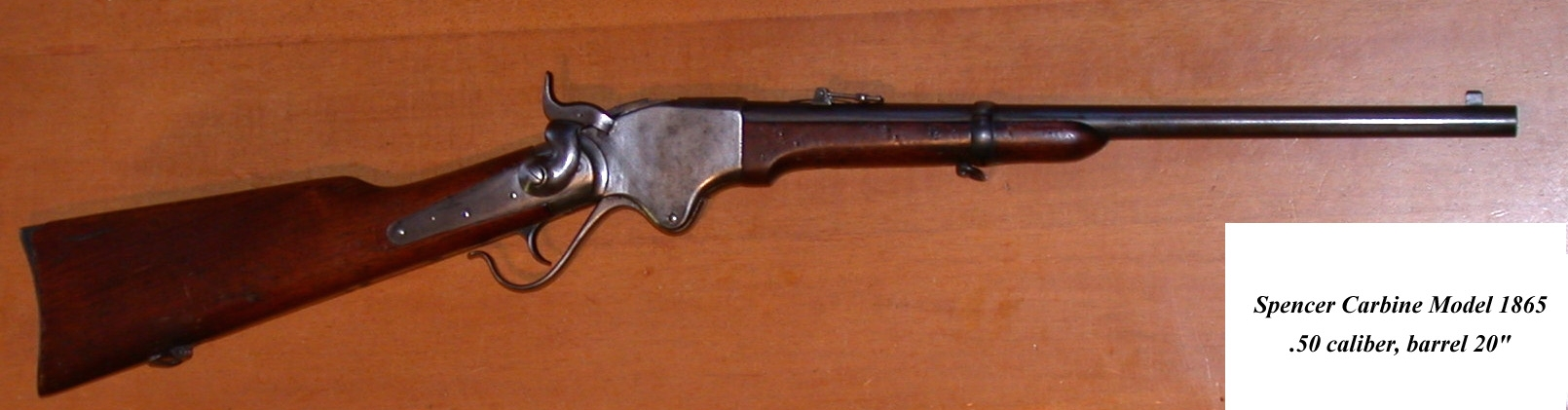
Spencer 1865 Carbine .50 caliber

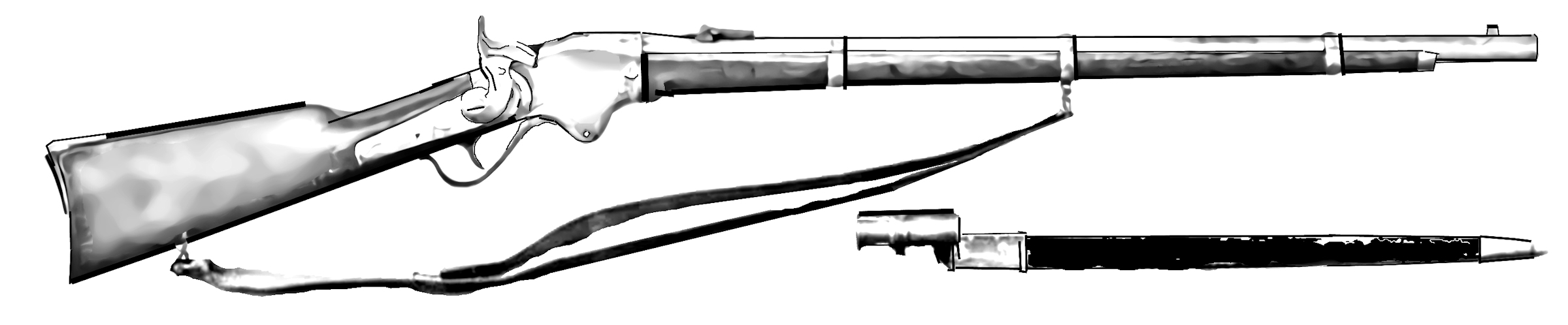
1862 Spencer Rifle with sling and bayonet

The socket bayonets were utilized and based on the Spanish M-1857 "Enfield" pattern rifles. The manufacturing output exceeded 11,000 units, reaching approximately 11,500 units.

The Spencer showed itself to be very reliable under combat conditions, with a sustainable rate-of-fire in excess of 20 rounds per minute. Compared to standard muzzle-loaders, with a rate of fire of 2–3 rounds per minute, this represented a significant tactical advantage. However, effective tactics had yet to be developed to take advantage of the higher rate of fire. Similarly, the supply chain was not well enough prepared to transport the extra ammunition. Detractors also complained that the amount of smoke produced was such that it was hard to see the enemy, which was not surprising since even the smoke produced by muzzleloaders would quickly blind whole regiments, and even divisions as if they were standing in thick fog, especially on still days.

One of the advantages of the Spencer was that its ammunition was waterproof and hardy, and could stand the constant jostling of long storage on the march, such as Wilson's Raid. The story goes that every round of paper and linen Sharps ammunition carried in the supply wagons was found useless after long storage in supply wagons. Spencer ammunition had no such problem owing to the new technology of metallic cartridges.

In the late 1860s, the Spencer company was sold to the Fogerty Rifle Company and ultimately to Winchester. Many Spencer carbines were later sold as surplus to France where they were used during the Franco-Prussian War in 1870.

Even though the Spencer company went out of business in 1869, (Note: Lugs gives a date of 1883 for bankruptcy, although also hints that Spencer production halted some time after the Civil War but resumed production of new models in 1882; a Spencer Company in Windsor, Ontario, was founded in 1883 and went bankrupt shortly afterwards.) ammunition was manufactured in the United States into the 1920s. Later, many rifles and carbines were converted to centerfire, which could fire cartridges made from the centerfire .50-70 brass. The original archetype of rimfire ammunition can still be obtained on the specialty market.

=== Use by cavalry ===
After the American Civil War, thousands of Spencer carbines were rechambered to 56-50 and issued to Cavalry Troopers posted west of the Mississippi. They carried them in large numbers and gave Zeoman service until the Spencer was replaced by the 1873 Springfield Carbine in 45-70 Govt in late 1874. One of the most famous battles involving the Spencer Carbine was in 1868 during the Battle of the Washita in what is now west central Oklahoma. Brevet Lt. Gen. George Custer of the Seventh Cavalry used Spencer carbines to good effect against a superior number of Comanche lead by Black Kettle. It would not be the last time Custer went against superior numbers of hostiles, as history would show. Argentina purchased 500 carbines between 1865 and 1869. They were issued to the Argentine cavalry (especially the President's Escort Squadron) and a few to the Navy, and were used against natives.

In 1867 Brigadier General James F. Rusling of the Quartermaster's Department recommended cavalry exclusively use the carbine against mounted Indian raiders, after completing a one-year tour of the new western territories.

In 1866 during the Paraguayan War, Spencer carbines were acquired by the Brazilian Army at the request of the Marquis of Caxias, though issues with ammunition delayed their distribution. New attempts were made in 1867, the weapon was distributed in large numbers to the rifle squadrons of the Cavalry Regiments (the first unit to receive it was the 5th Mounted Caçadores Corps), and it was soon in more or less common use, having first distinguished itself in combat on September 24, 1867, during the siege of Humaitá. Its advantages became clear during the Campaign of the Hills. This led Count D'Eu to form ad hoc units of sharpshooters, bringing together various cavalry squadrons armed with Spencers into improvised units. Brazilian officers preferred the Spencer due to its reputation, even after the Winchester carbine was adopted in 1872; the carbine remained in used with cavalry companies in more remote areas until the 1890s, when they were replaced by the Karabinber 88 carbines.

In September 1868 Major Frederick A. Forsyth led a small force of veterans, an "elite mounted attack-and-pursuit force", and came into heavy contact with a superior number of Cheyenne warriors led by Roman Nose. The battle is known as the Battle of Beecher Island. Forsyth's band was armed with Spencer repeating carbines and 150 rounds of .56-50 Spencer cartridges per weapon. Forsyth and his men were able to hold off and turn away a vastly larger force. It is claimed that this was largely due to the "rapid firepower of the seven-shot Spencer carbines."

In the summer of 1870–1871 Chilean cavalry adopted the rifles, a change that substantially increased military disparity with the indigenous Mapuche who were at war with Chile. An example of this was Quilapán's warriors' attack on Chilean cavalry on January 25, 1871, when mounted Mapuche warriors were armed with spears and bolas. The Mapuches panicked as they did not expect a second round of shots, and casualties among them were high.

From 1873-1874, Falisse & Trapmann in Liege produced a little under 1,000 carbines for Brazil. These are found to be chambered in .56-50 Centerfire, a 1877 modification done by a local factory

== See also ==
- M1819 Hall rifle
- Cimarron Firearms
- Colt's New Model revolving rifle
- Henry rifle
- Rifles in the American Civil War
- Sharps rifle
- Volcanic rifle
