= Volcanic Repeating Arms =

American firearms manufacturer

- Type: Private
- Industry: Weapons
- Predecessor: Smith & Wesson Company
- Founded: 1855; 171 years ago
- Founders: Horace Smith; Daniel B. Wesson
- Defunct: 1856; 170 years ago
- Fate: Acquired
- Successor: New Haven Arms Company
- Headquarters: Norwich, Connecticut - New Haven, Connecticut, United States
- Key people: Horace Smith; Daniel B. Wesson; Benjamin Tyler Henry; Oliver Winchester; Courtlandt Palmer
- Products: Rifles, Pistols, Ammunition

The Volcanic Repeating Arms Company was an American company formed in 1855 by partners Horace Smith and Daniel B. Wesson to develop Walter Hunt's Rocket Ball ammunition and lever action mechanism. Volcanic made an improved version of the Rocket Ball ammunition, and a carbine and pistol version of the lever action gun to fire it. While the Volcanic Repeating Arms Company was short-lived, its descendants, Winchester Repeating Arms Company and Smith & Wesson became major firearms manufactures.

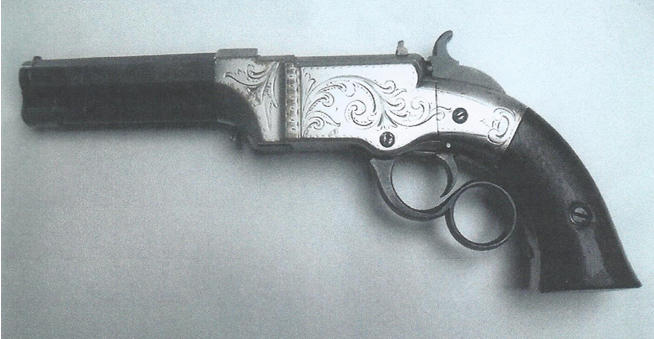
A Volcanic pocket pistol

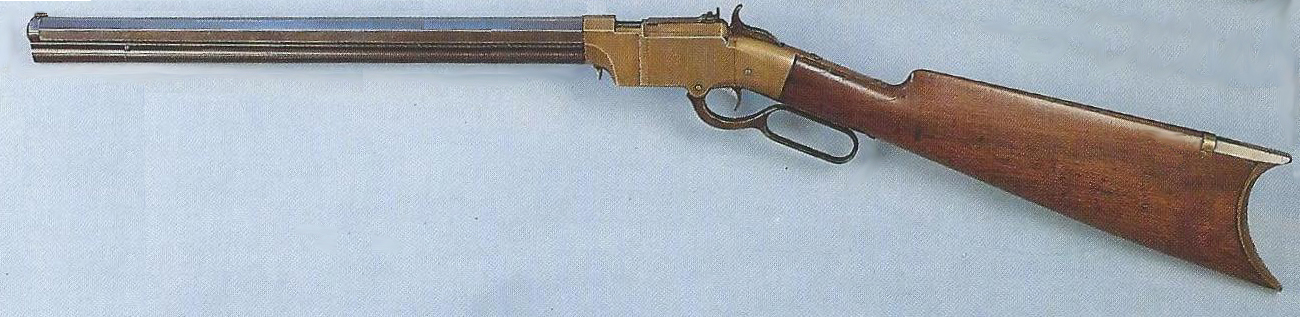
A Volcanic rifle, 16 1/2 inch barrel

== History ==
The original 1848 Volcanic Repeating Rifle design by Hunt was revolutionary, introducing an early iteration of the lever action repeating mechanism and the tubular magazine still common today. However, Hunt's design was far from perfect, and only a couple of prototypes were developed; the only one known is currently in the Firearms Museum in Cody, Wyoming. Lewis Jennings patented an improved version of Hunt's design in 1849, and versions of the Jennings patent design were built by Robbins & Lawrence Co. (under the direction of shop foreman Benjamin Tyler Henry) and sold by C. P. Dixon. Horace Smith was also hired by Courtlandt Palmer to improve the Jennings Rifle, patenting the Smith-Jennings in 1851. It is estimated that fewer than 2000 of these two models were made until 1852, when financial troubles ceased production.

In 1854, partners Horace Smith and Daniel B. Wesson joined with Courtlandt Palmer, the businessman who had purchased the Jennings and Smith-Jennings patent rights, and further improved on the operating mechanism, developing the Smith & Wesson Lever pistol, and a new Volcanic cartridge. Production was in the shop of Horace Smith in Norwich, Connecticut. The new cartridge improved upon the Hunt Rocket Ball with the addition of a primer. Originally using the name "Smith & Wesson Company", the name was changed to "Volcanic Repeating Arms Company" in 1855, with the addition of new investors, one of whom was Oliver Winchester. The Volcanic Repeating Arms Company obtained all rights for the Volcanic designs (both rifle and pistol versions were in production by this time) as well as the ammunition, from the Smith & Wesson Company. Wesson remained as plant manager for 8 months before rejoining Smith to found the "Smith & Wesson Revolver Company" upon obtaining the licensing of the Rollin White rear loading cylinder patent.

A full size Volcanic pistol

Winchester forced the insolvency of the Volcanic Arms Company in late 1856, took over ownership and moved the plant to New Haven, Connecticut, where it was reorganized as the New Haven Arms Company in April 1857. B. Tyler Henry was hired as plant superintendent when Robbins & Lawrence suffered financial difficulties and Henry left their employ. While continuing to make the Volcanic rifle and pistol, Henry began to experiment with the new rimfire ammunition, and modified the Volcanic lever action design to use it. The result was the Henry rifle. By 1866, the company once again reorganized, this time as the Winchester Repeating Arms Company, and the name of Winchester became synonymous with lever action rifles.

== Gallery ==
Examples of Volcanic Repeating Arms

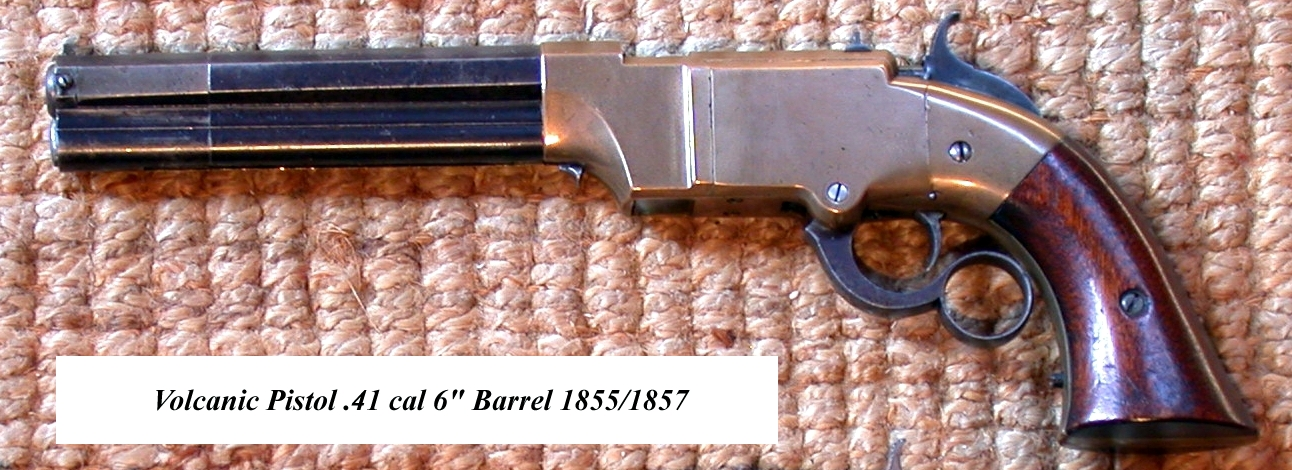
A Volcanic pistol in .41 caliber

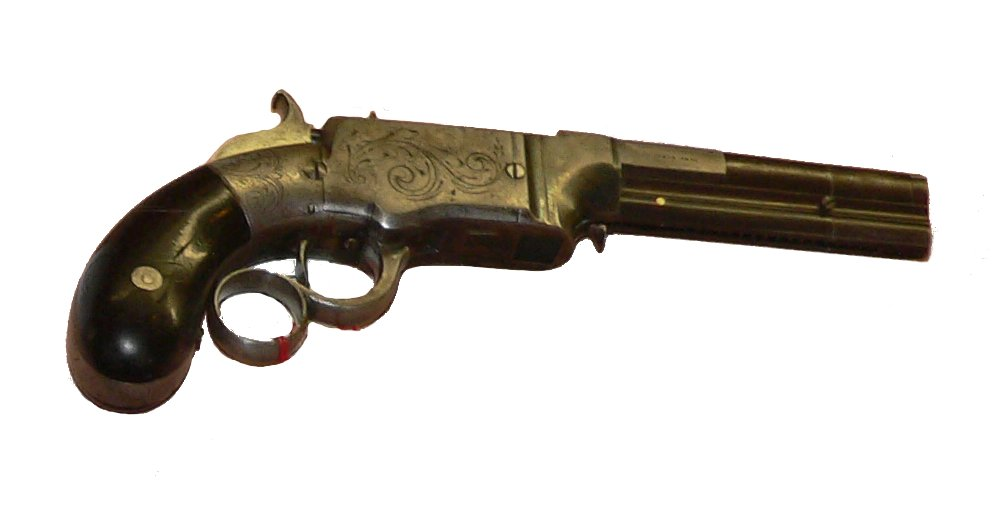
A Volcanic pistol, circa 1855 in .31 caliber

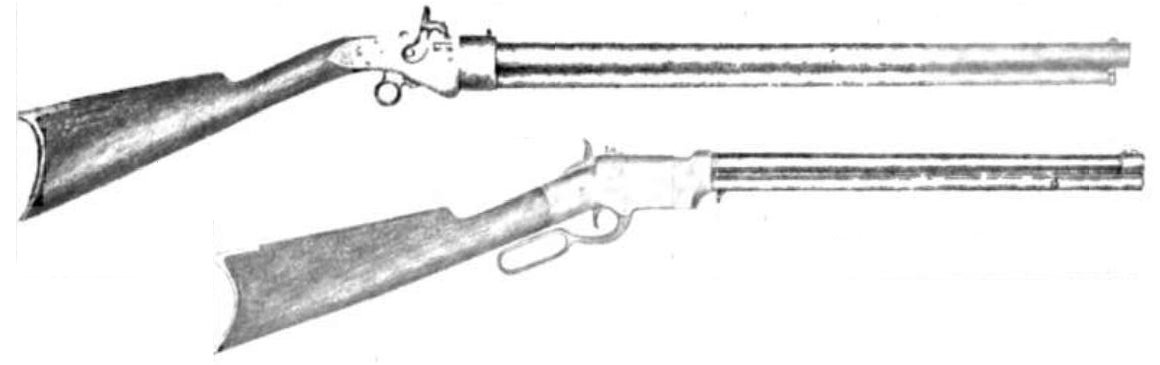
The Jennings (top) and Volcanic (bottom) rifles

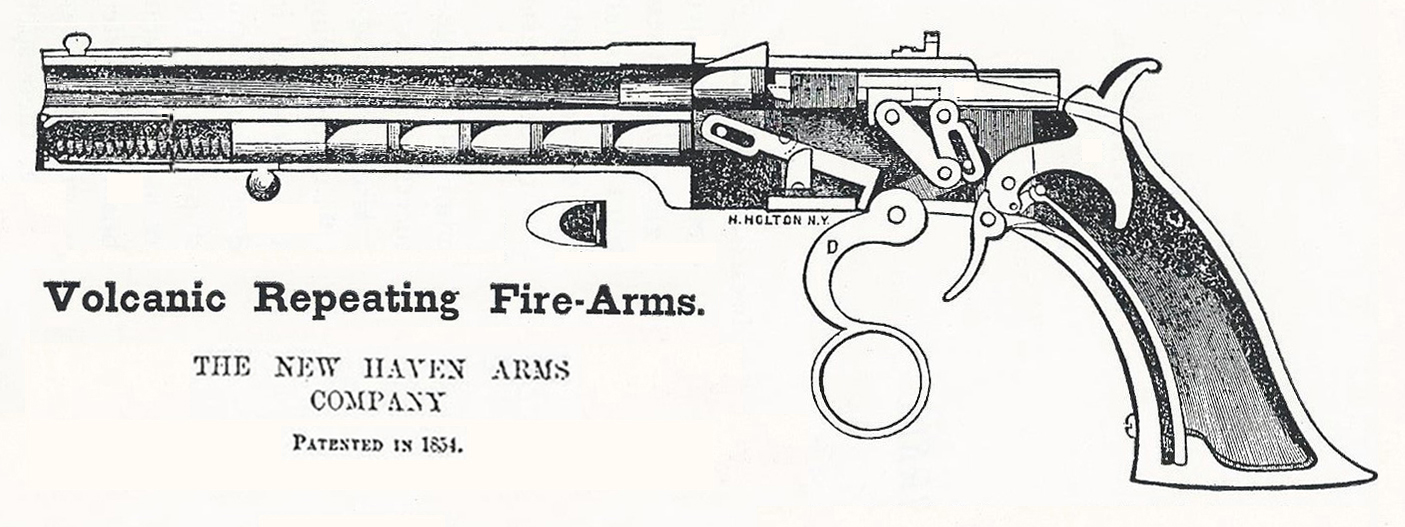
Anatomy of a Volcanic handgun

== In popular culture ==
The Rider, the title character of Edward M. Erdelac's Judeocentric Lovecraftian weird west series Merkabah Rider, carries a Volcanic pistol inlaid with gold and silver and bearing various Solomonic talismans and wards, including a jeweled Tree of Sephiroth on the handle.

In the 2005 videogame “Gun”, The Volcanic pistol makes an appearance, referred to in-game as “Volcanic 10”

The 2007 videogame "Fistful of Frags" also features the Volcanic pistol as a weapon.

The Volcanic pistol is one of the many sidearms the player can get in the 2010 Western videogame Red Dead Redemption, as well as its 2018 prequel, Red Dead Redemption 2, and its online multiplayer expansion, Red Dead Online.

The 2026 demo of "Ballistic.exe" prominently features a Volcanic pistol, which can be upgraded with a stock and a full-length barrel. A smokeless powder version of its rocket ball ammunition can be acquired, which increases the usable range and accuracy of the firearm for long range target shooting.

== Bibliography ==
- Flayderman, E. Norman: "Flayderman's Guide to Antique Firearms and their Values 9th edition" Gun Digest Books, 2007
- Houze, Herbert G.: "Winchester Repeating Arms Company; Its History and Development from 1865 to 1981" Krause Publication. 1994
- Lewis, Col. B. R.: "The Volcanic Arms"; American Rifleman, November 1957
- Madis, George: "The Winchester Book"; Art and Reference House. 1985
- McDowell, R. Bruce; "Evolution of the Winchester"; Armory Publications, 1985
- Edsall, James: "Volcanic Firearms – And Their Successors"; Pioneer Press, 1974
- Internet Movie Firearms Database: For a Few Dollars More. Last edit, 15 May 2012.
