= Benjamin Tyler Henry =

American gunsmith and manufacturer

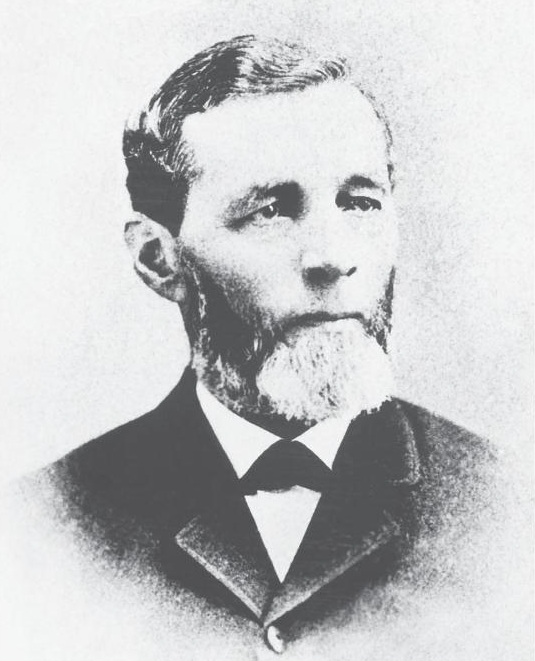
- Benjamin Tyler Henry
- Born: March 22, 1821; Claremont, New Hampshire, US
- Died: June 8, 1898 (aged 77); New Haven County, Connecticut, US
- Occupations: Firearms designer and inventor

Benjamin Tyler Henry (March 22, 1821 – June 8, 1898) was an American gunsmith and manufacturer. He was the inventor of the Henry rifle, the first reliable lever-action repeating rifle.

Henry was born in Claremont, New Hampshire, in 1821. He apprenticed to a gunsmith as a young man and worked his way up to shop foreman at the Robins & Lawrence Arms Company of Windsor, Vermont, where he worked with Horace Smith and Daniel B. Wesson on a rifle known as the "Volitional Repeater."

In 1854, Horace Smith and Daniel B. Wesson formed a new company with Courtlandt Palmer, and further improved the operating mechanism, developing the Smith & Wesson Lever pistol, and a new Volcanic cartridge. Production was in the shop of Horace Smith in Norwich, Connecticut. Originally using the name "Smith & Wesson Company," the name was changed to "Volcanic Repeating Arms Company" in 1855, with the addition of new investors, one of whom was Oliver Winchester. The Volcanic Repeating Arms Company obtained all rights for the Volcanic designs (both rifle and pistol versions were in production by this time) as well as the ammunition, from the Smith & Wesson Company. Wesson remained as plant manager for 8 months before rejoining Smith to found the "Smith & Wesson Revolver Company" upon obtaining the licensing of the Rollin White rear loading cylinder patent. Winchester forced the insolvency of the Volcanic Arms Company in late 1856, took over ownership and moved the plant to New Haven, Connecticut, where it was reorganized as the New Haven Arms Company in April 1857 and Henry was hired as plant superintendent. On October 16, 1860, he received a patent on the Henry .44 caliber repeating rifle, which soon proved the worth of the lever-action design on the battlefields of the American Civil War, where Henry rifles were used alongside muzzle-loading rifled muskets such as the Springfield Model 1861. The first Henry rifles were not produced for army use until mid-1862.

In 1864, Henry grew angry over what he believed was inadequate compensation and attempted to have the Connecticut legislature award ownership of New Haven Arms to him. Oliver Winchester, hastening back from Europe, forestalled the move and reorganized New Haven Arms yet again as the Winchester Repeating Arms Company. Winchester had the basic design of the Henry rifle completely modified and improved to become the first Winchester rifle, the Model 1866, which fired the same .44 caliber rimfire cartridges as the Henry but had an improved magazine with the addition of a loading gate on the right side of the receiver (invented by Winchester employee Nelson King) and, for the first time, a wooden forearm.

Henry left the Winchester Repeating Arms Company over this dispute and worked as an individual gunsmith until his death in 1898.

== See also ==
- Winchester Repeating Arms Company
- Winchester rifle
- Henry repeating rifle
