= Breechblock =

Part of the firearm action

Illustration of some firearm breechblocks

A breechblock (or breech block) is the part of the firearm action that closes the breech of a breech loading weapon (whether small arms or artillery) before or at the moment of firing. It seals the breech and contains the pressure generated by the ignited propellant. Retracting the breechblock allows the chamber to be loaded with a cartridge.

Breechblocks are categorised by the type or design of the mechanism by which it is locked or closed for firing. The firearm action more fully refers to the mechanism by which the operator actuates the opening and closing of the breech.

== Variants ==
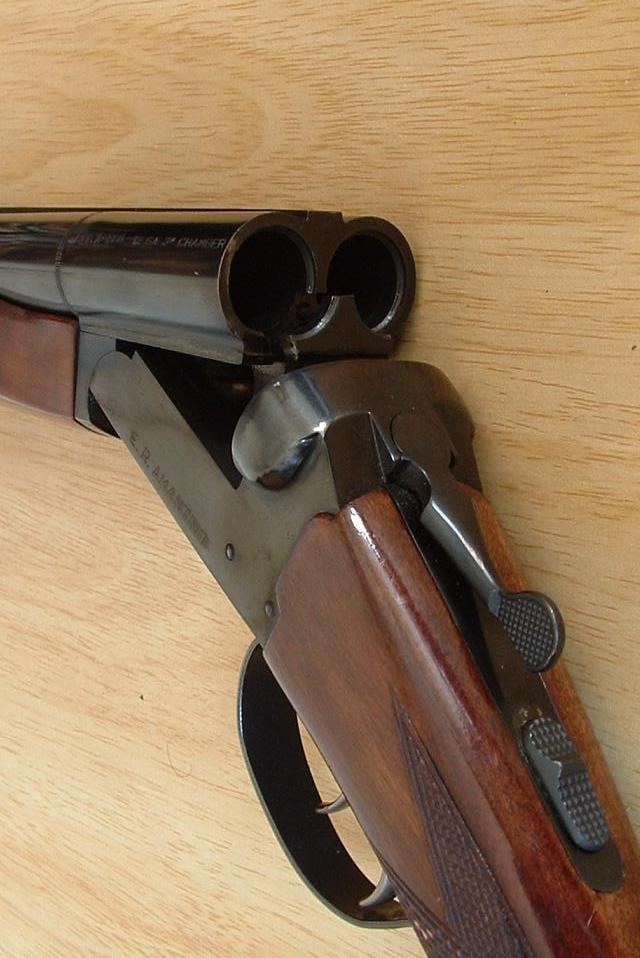
A typical break-action, double-barreled shotgun

A way of closing the breech or chamber is an essential part of any breech-loading weapon or firearm. Perhaps the simplest way of achieving this is a break-action, in which the barrel, forestock and breech pivot on a hinge that joins the front assembly to the rear of the firearm, incorporating the rear of the breech, the butt and usually, the trigger mechanism. A breechblock is a separate component and is not a feature of the break-action. A breechblock must close against the rear of the breech for firing but be able to be retracted or otherwise moved for loading or unloading or to remove a spent cartridge.

A breechblock is not a component of designs with multiple or moveable chambers such as revolvers, harmonica guns, Kalthoff repeaters, Kammerlader rifles or, split breech designs. (Note: A less common type of breech is the split-breech design known as the "nutcracker". It is perhaps better described as a split chamber, since it is the chamber that contains the cartridge that is split. This type of breech consists of two counter-rotating sprockets, with a temporary chamber being formed where they touch. Relatively few guns have used this design. The prototype Fokker-Leimberger multiple-barreled machine gun used this design, but it had numerous problems with ruptured cases.) Another "Fokker Split Breech Rotary Machine Gun, ca. 1930" was donated to Kentucky Military Treasures; according to the museum record it "proved unsuccessful because of its inability to seal breech cylinders". A couple of 1920s US patents by other inventors also proposed to use this principle. The British also experimented with the design in the 1950s for aircraft guns, without success. It has only been used successfully in low-pressure applications, such as the Mk 18 Mod 0 grenade launcher.|group=notes}}

This article primarily addresses the matter of breechblock design, as opposed to the action, which relates more with how the mechanism is operated, even if the distinction is not always clear.

=== Rotating bolt ===
Usually referred to as a bolt rather than a breechblock, a rotating bolt is perhaps the most common variant. It is so called, because its operation is similar to a pad bolt or barrel bolt. The bolt slides in the receiver along the axis of the barrel and is rotated in the same axis to lock or unlock it against a closed breech. It is the basis for the bolt action, in which the bolt is rotated and retracted by a handle attached to the bolt. In some designs, the handle (sometimes called a cocking handle) rotates to lock against a shoulder in the receiver or body of the firearm. This type of locking is usually reserved for low-pressure applications such as the .22 cal rimfire series. More often, the bolt locks closed with two or more lugs that operate like a bayonet mount. Multiple lugs permit a smaller degree of rotation to lock and unlock the breech. Most types are front-locking and have the lugs mounted near the breech face. A notable exception is the rear-locking system used in the Lee–Enfield.

A rotating bolts locks in a way similar to a bayonet mount, such as shown here (but with much stronger lugs and locking grooves than shown).

Operation of a rotating bolt

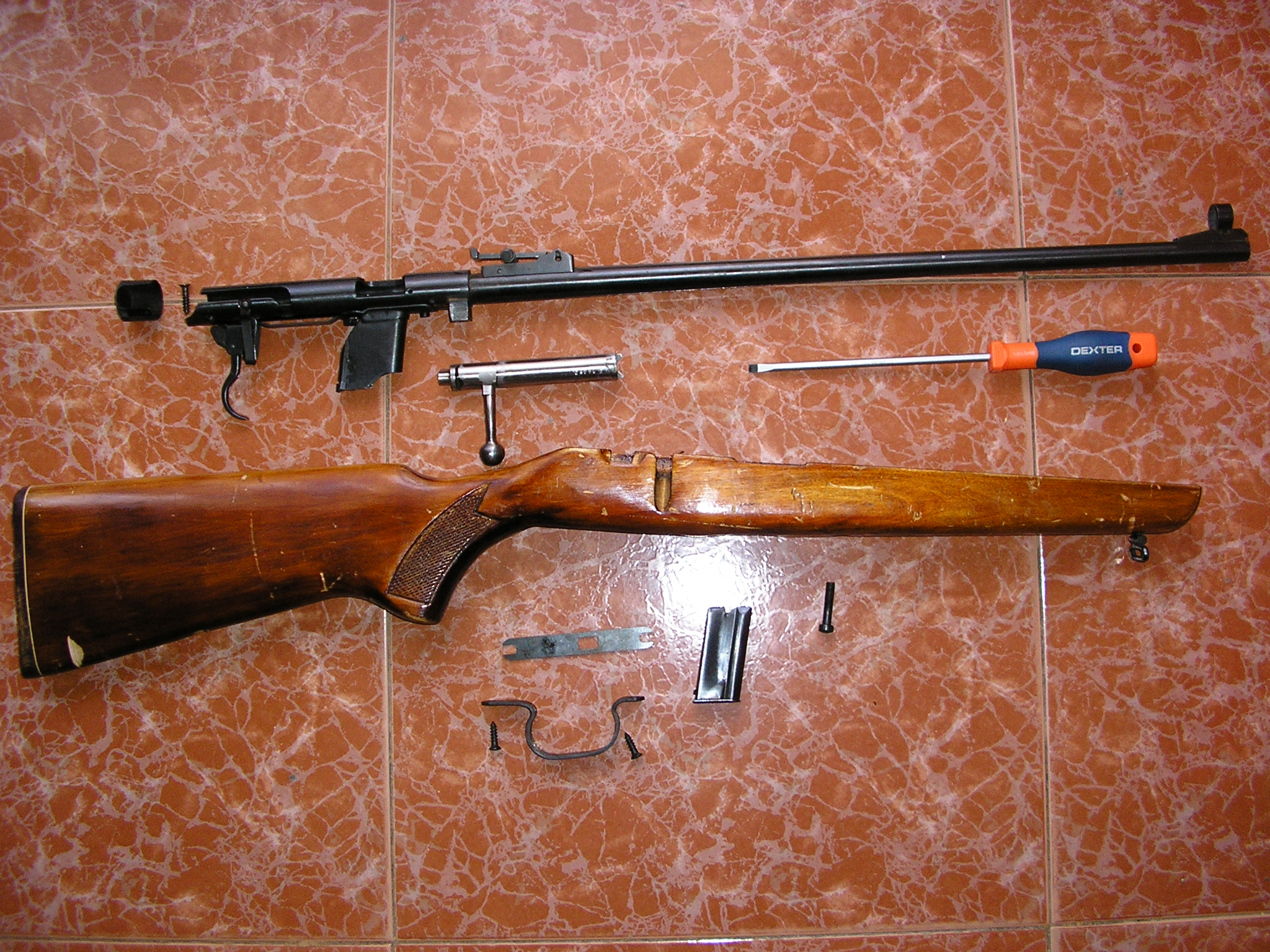
A TOZ-17 cadet rifle chambered for .22 long rifle which has been disassembled. The bolt is locked by the bolt handle being dropped into a notch in the receiver.

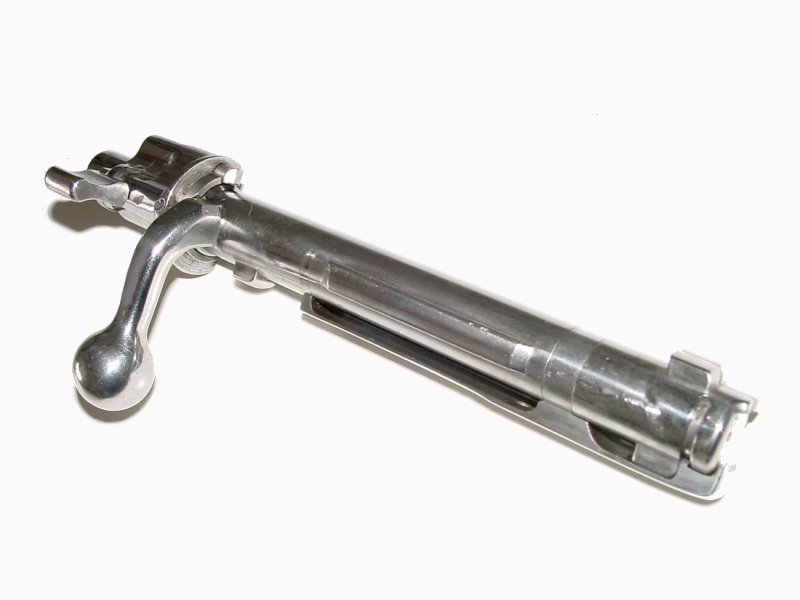
A Mauser 98 bolt showing two locking lugs just behind the face of the bolt. There is a third "emergency" lug in front of the bolt handle, in case the primary ones fail under pressure. In some designs the bolt handle itself may serve as the emergency "lug".

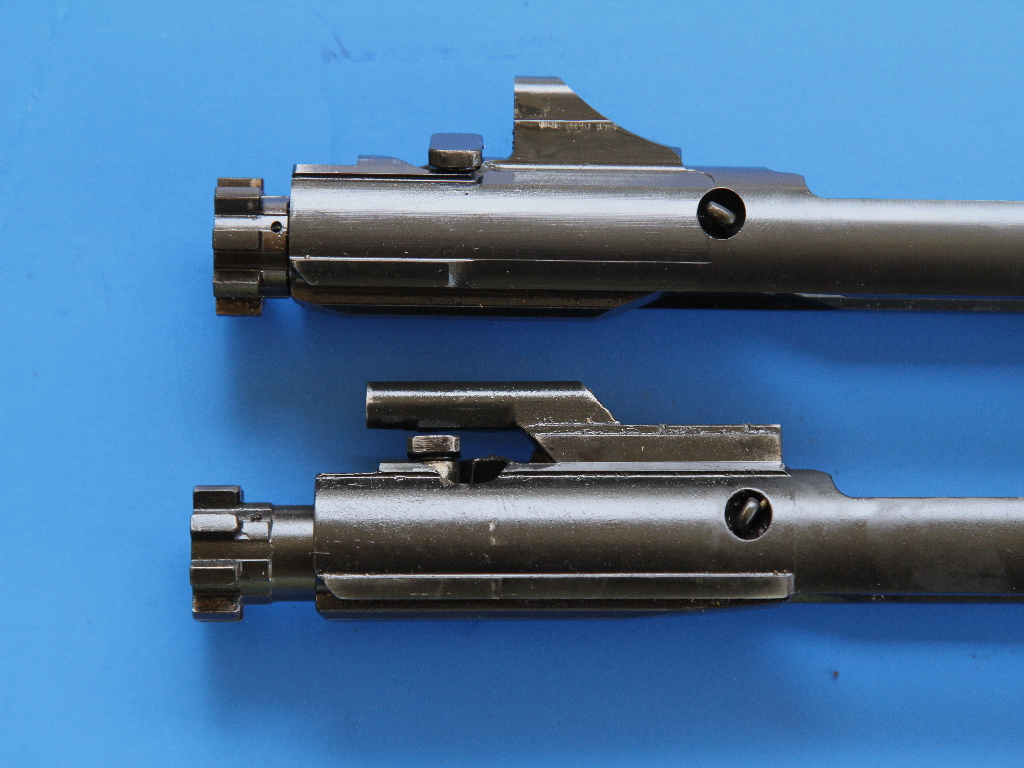
AR-15 bolt carriers showing multiple locking lugs on the bolts

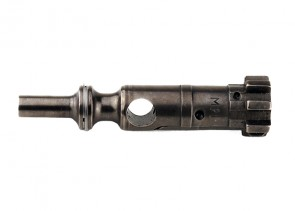
An AR-15 bolt stripped from the bolt carrier

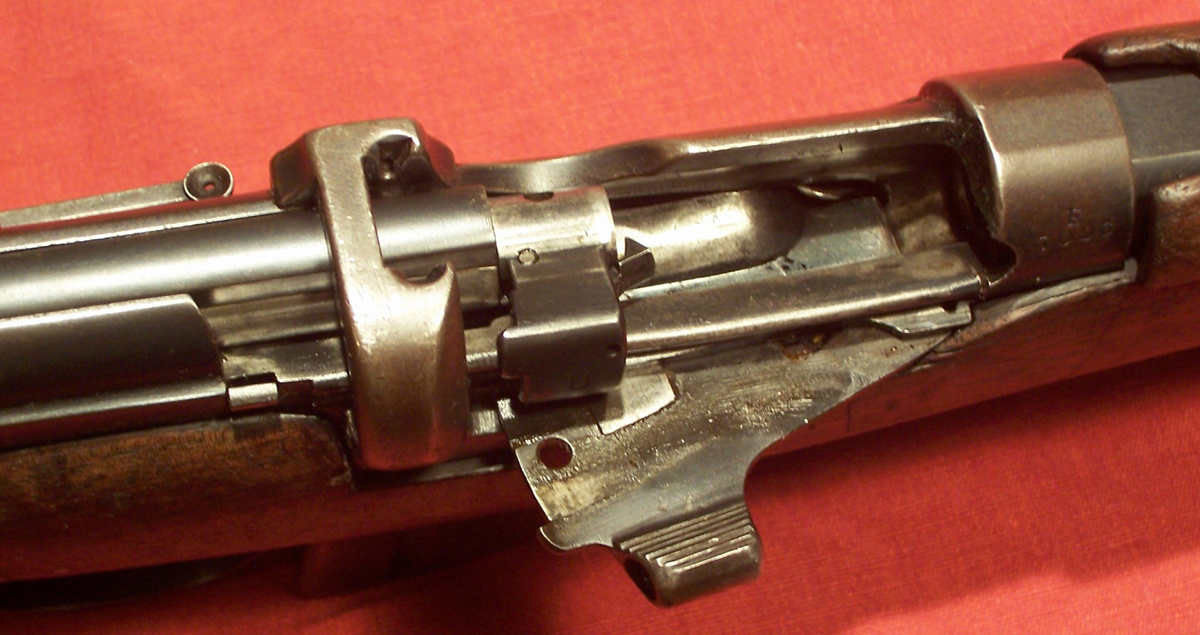
A Lee-Enfield Mk III rifle with the bolt pulled back. The bolt lugs lock into the receiver bridge and are rear-locking.

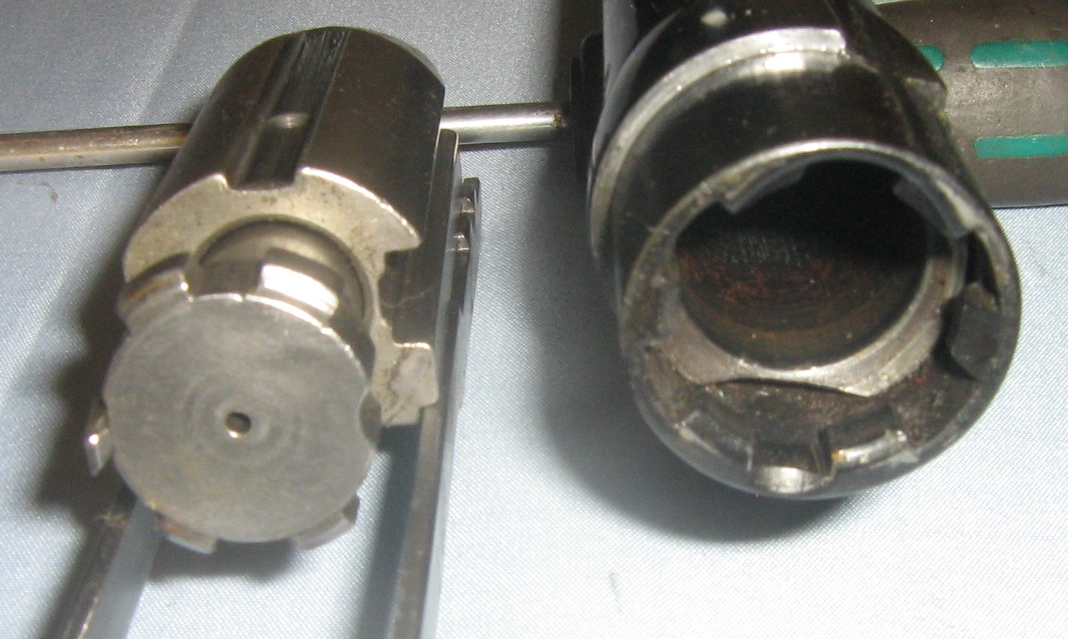
Rotating breechblock and breech face of the Winchester Model 1200 pump action shotgun.

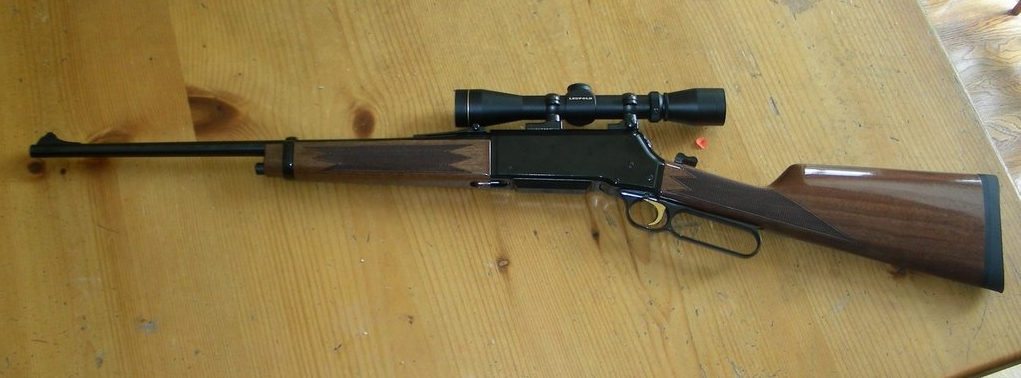
The Browning BLR lever action uses a rotating bolt.

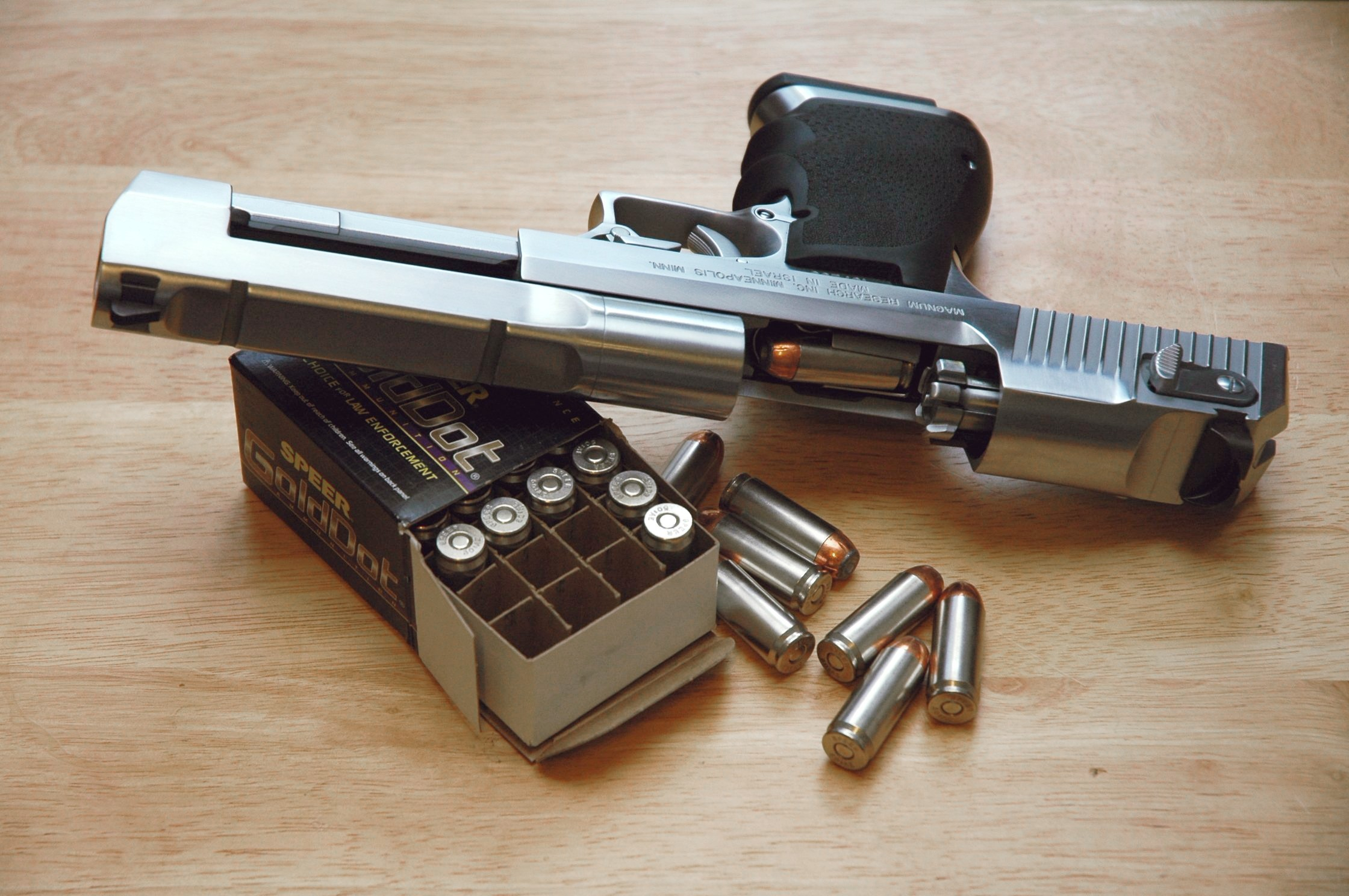
The Desert Eagle is a gas-operated, semi-automatic pistol using a rotating bolt.

Rotating bolts can be adapted to automatic or semi-automatic designs and lever or pump actions. In these cases, the bolt is held by a bolt carrier. With the breech locked, an initial rearward movement of the bolt carrier causes the bolt to rotate and unlock. Similarly, when closing the breech, the final forward movement of the carrier causes the bolt to rotate and lock the breech. This action is commonly achieved by a slot cut in the carrier that engages a pin through the bolt perpendicular to the axis of the barrel. It is a type of linear cam.

Straight-pull bolt-action firearms do not require the operator to rotate the cocking handle to cycle the action. Some straight-pull designs may use a rotating bolt but other breech-locking mechanisms can be employed.

=== Sliding block ===
The breechblock in a sliding block slides across the face of the breech to close it. The sliding action is perpendicular to the axis of the barrel. When the breechblock slides down to expose the breech, it is referred to as a falling-block, as used in the Sharps rifle. A sliding block is common in artillery. A vertical sliding block rises and falls while a horizontal sliding block slides to one side. It is a strong design. The breechblock is well supported by the receiver within which it slides and the mechanisms for opening and closing the breech do not have to act to any extent against the forces generated on firing.

Operation of a sliding block

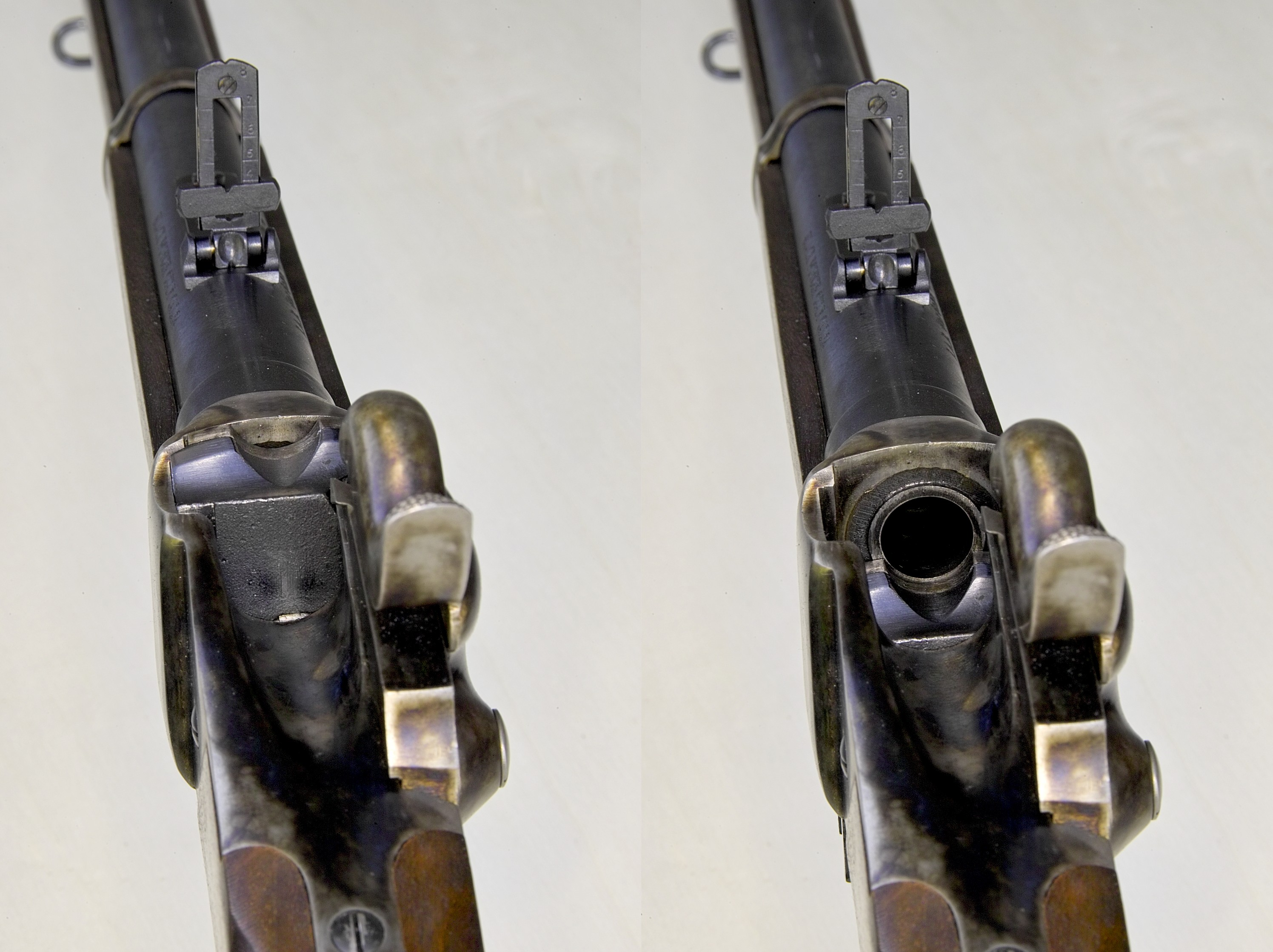
Looking at the breech of a Sharps rifle

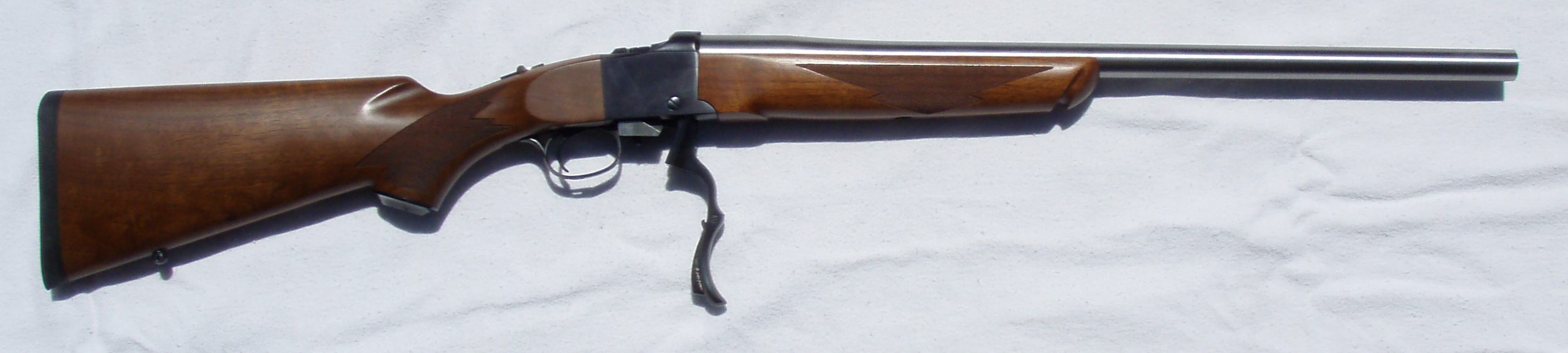
Ruger No. 1 single-shot falling-block rifle in .243 Winchester with custom barrel with action open

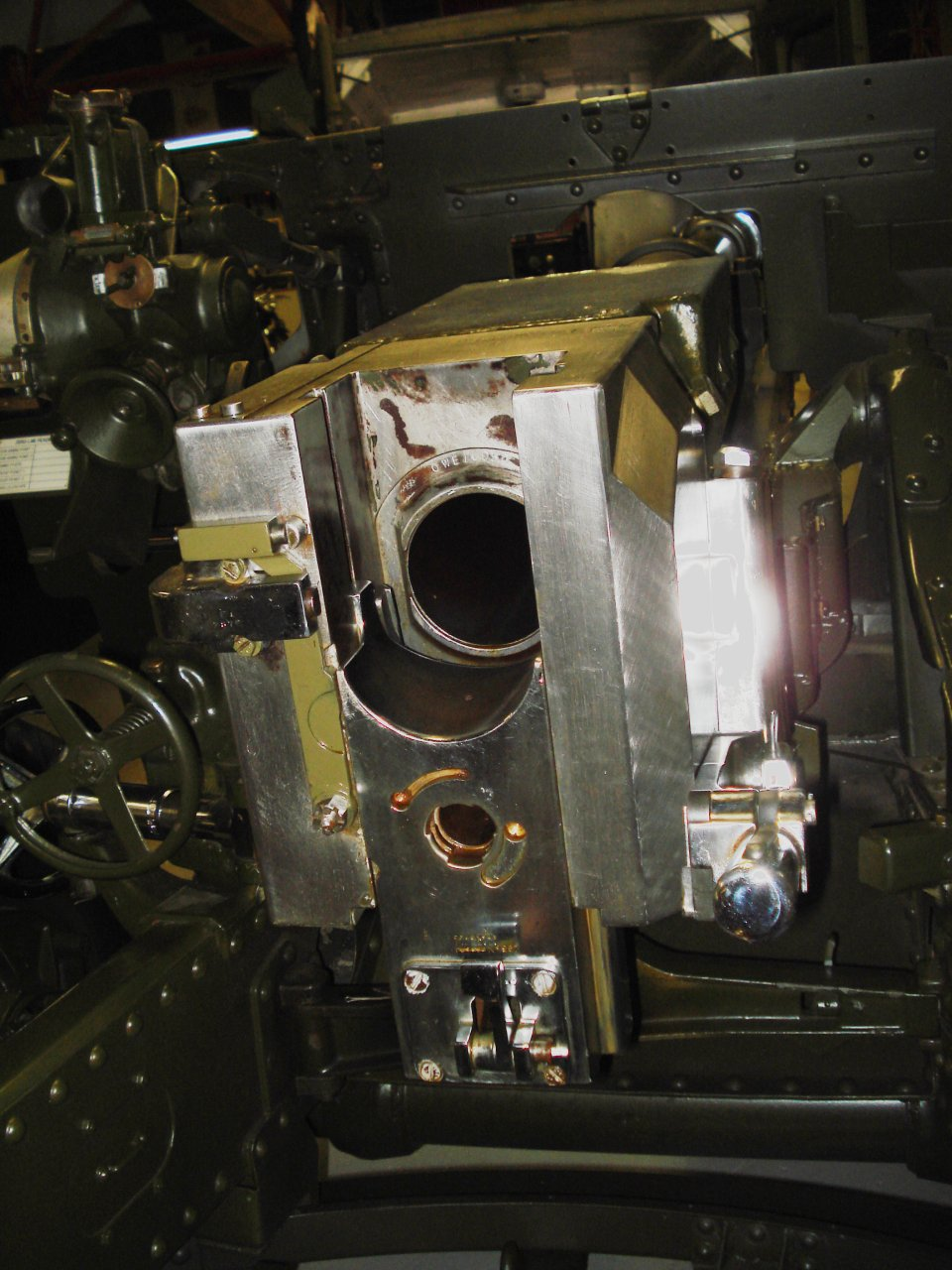
The open breech of an Ordnance QF 25-pounder

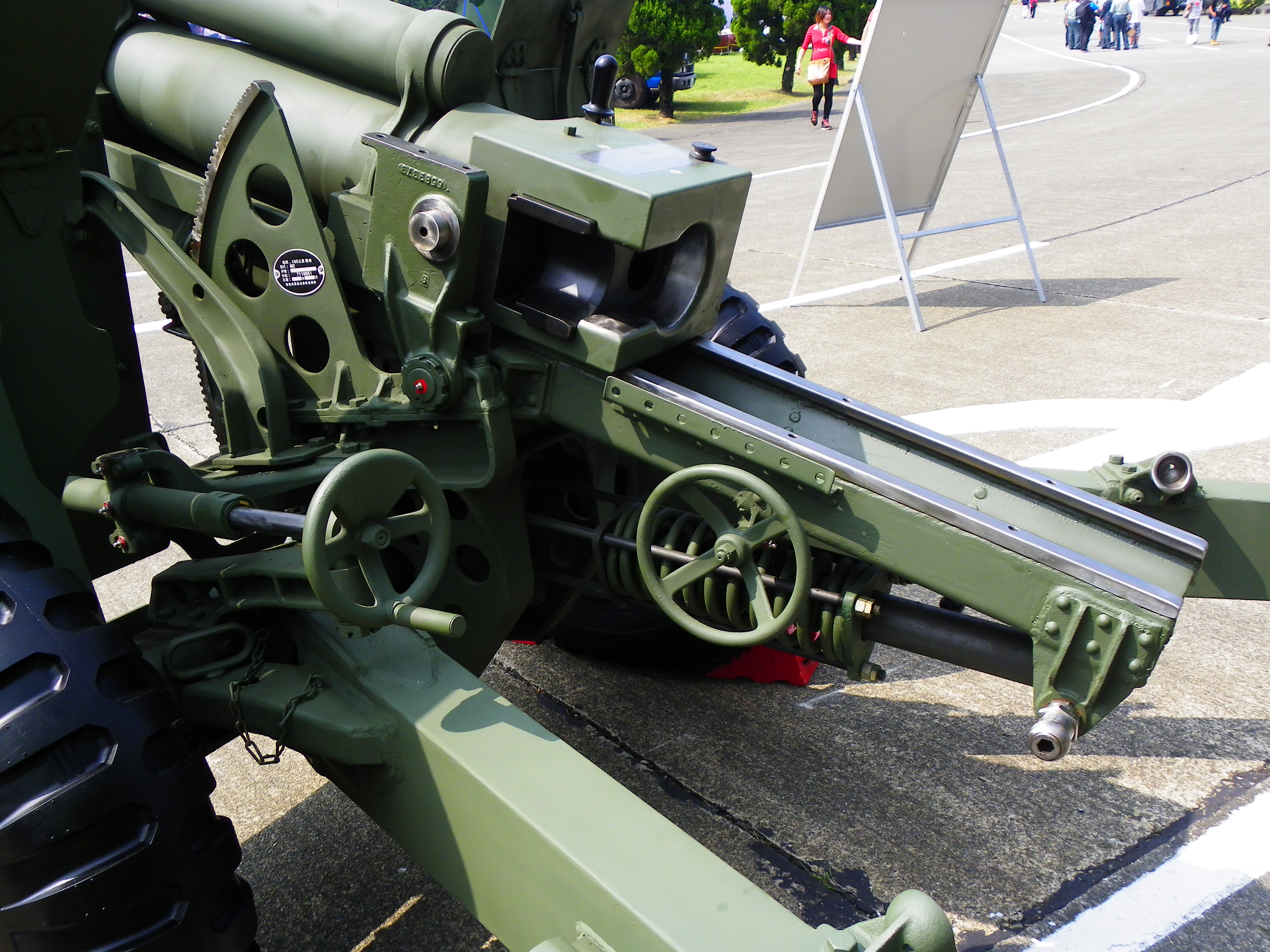
Breech of an M101A1 Howitzer

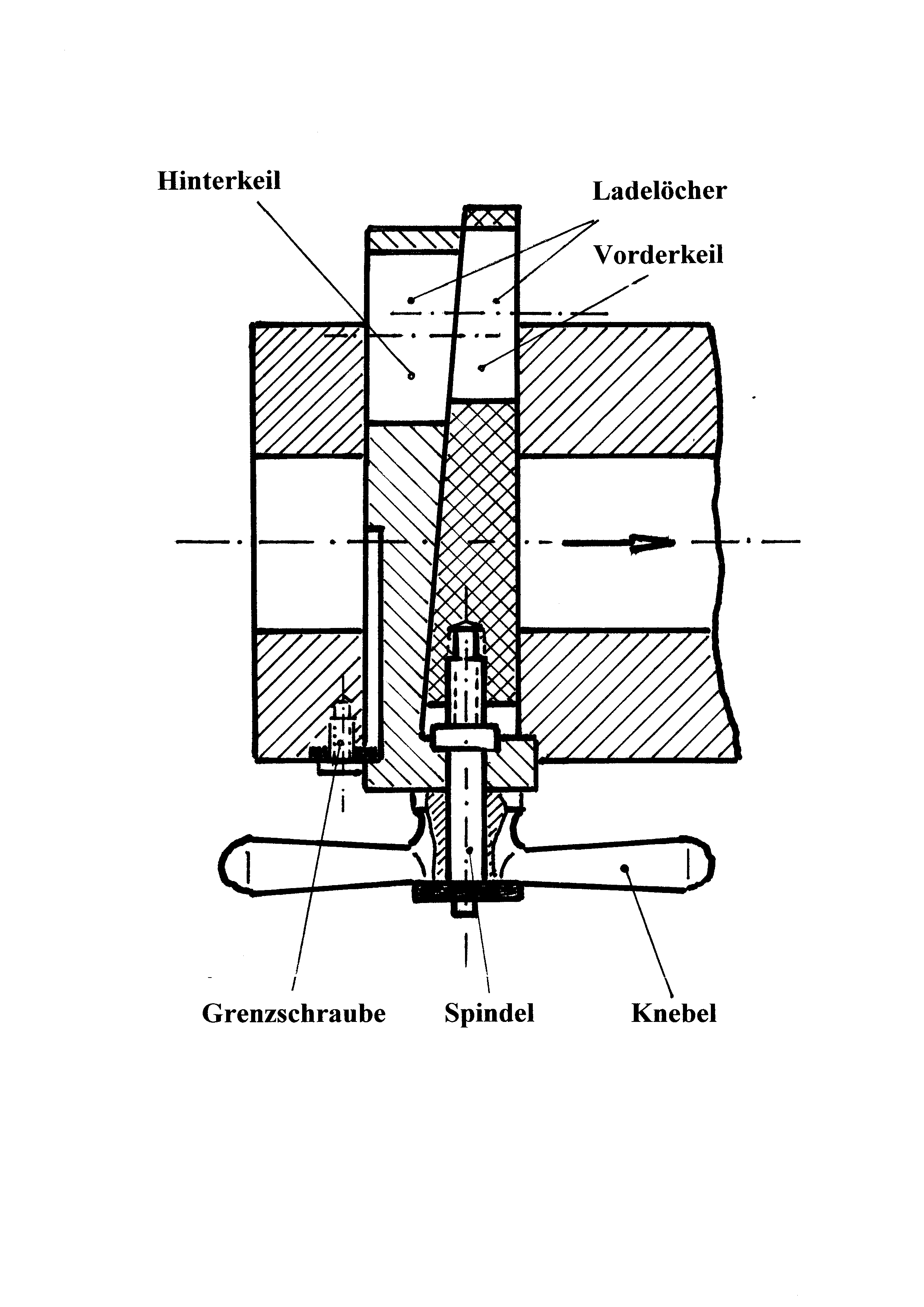
Section of the double wedge sliding breechblock of a C64 field gun, an early breech-loading field gun. The sliding breechblock consists of two opposed wedges. The screw mechanism moves the wedges relative to each other, to change the effective thickness of the breechblock. Expanding the block locks it in the closed position and seals the breech.

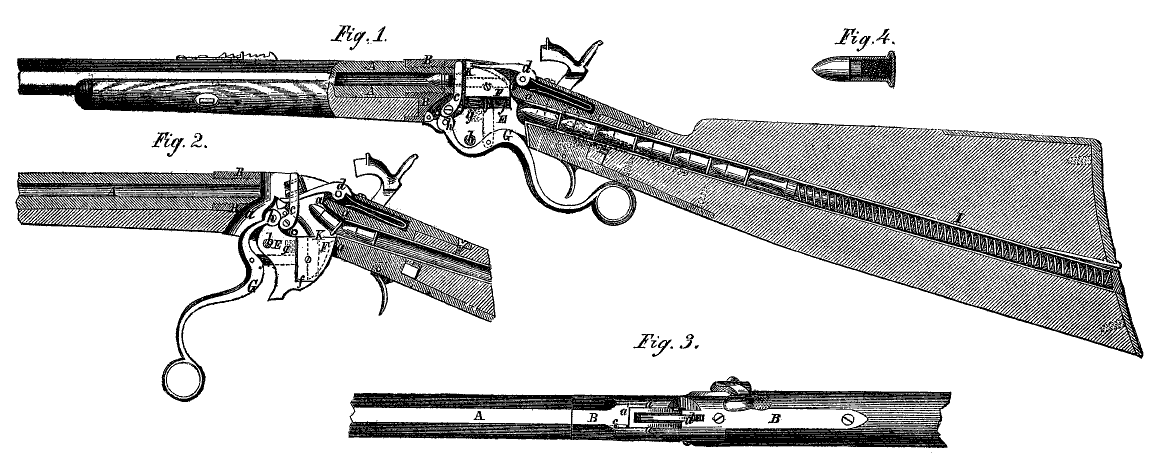
The Spencer repeating rifle uses a falling breechblock (F) mounted in a carrier (E). Figure 1, shows the breechblock raised. Firing forces are contained by the receiver at the rear of the breechblock.

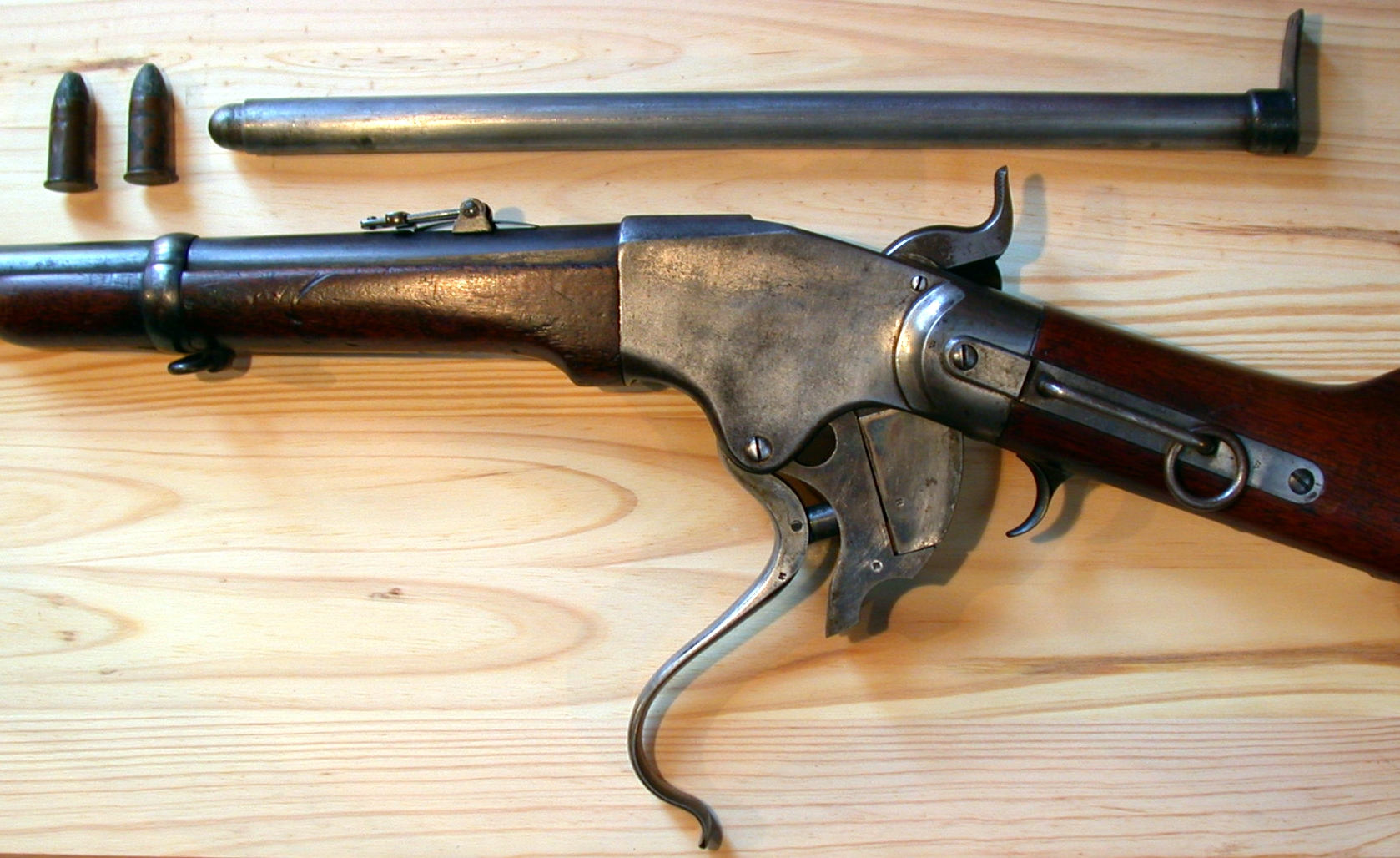
The Spencer repeating rifle with the breech open. Before the breechblock carrier can "roll" downward, the breechblock must fall vertically to clear the receiver.

=== Side-hinged breechblock ===
A side hinged breechblock is used in the Snider-Enfield. Other firearms using this type of breechblock include the Warner carbine, the Joslyn rifle and the Tarpley carbine. The breechblock is hinged parallel to the axis of the barrel and swings away to the side to expose the breech. Firing force is contained by the rear of the breechblock bearing on the receiver.

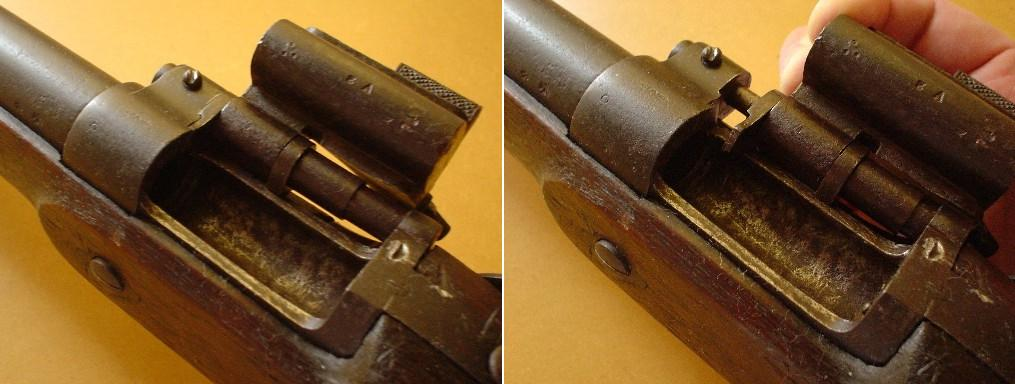
The opened breech on a Snider-Enfield showing operation of the ejector

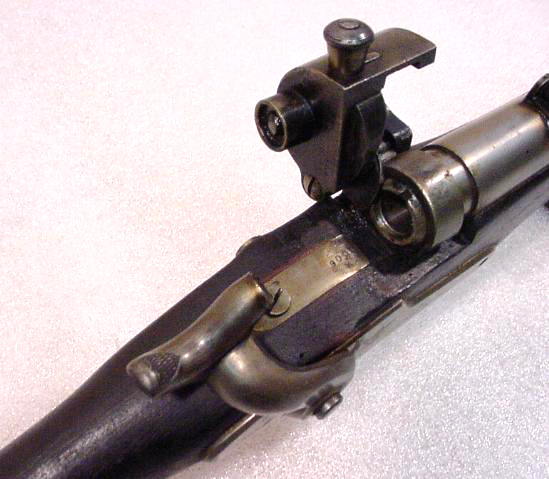
The side hinged breechblock of the Joslyn rifle

=== Rotating drum ===
A rotating drum breechblock or rotary breech consists of a cylinder which rotates on an axis offset from the barrel. It is also known as a cannon breech because of association with some cannon designs. A longitudinal cut-out section or eccentric hole provides access to the breech. Rotating the cylinder then closes the breech. The geometry is not unlike the cylinder of a revolver. In the M1867 Werndl–Holub, the cylindrical breechblock is retained at the rear by the receiver. Mating faces can be profiled (i.e. not faced perpendicular to the axis of rotation) so that the breech tends to seal or fit more closely as it is closed.

the Nordenfelt eccentric screw breech is a variation of this design. Instead of holding the breechblock between the breech at one end and the receiver at the other, in this design the breechblock is threaded around its circumference and is screwed into the breech until it meets the rear of the chamber. The breech is opened by rotating it a fraction of a full turn, until a hole through the breechblock aligns with the bore. The Magnum Research Lone Eagle pistol is a single-shot pistol chambered for rifle cartridges that also uses a rotating drum breechblock.

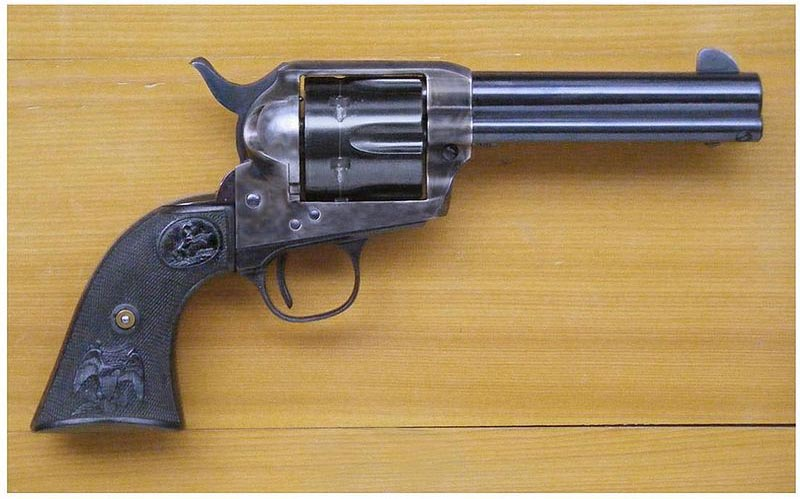
The geometry of a rotating drum breechblock is similar to the alignment of the cylinder and barrel of a revolver

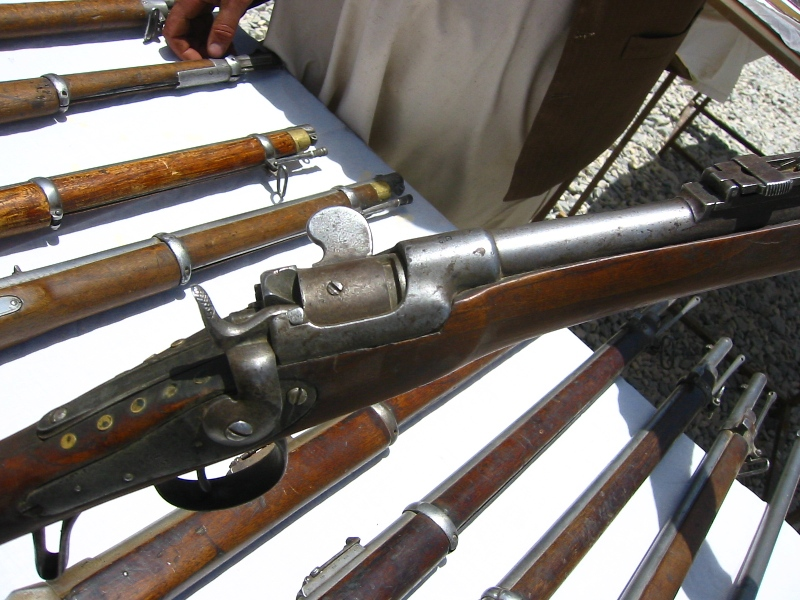
The rotating drum breechblock of the M1867 Werndl–Holub rifle

Animation of the Werndl rifle

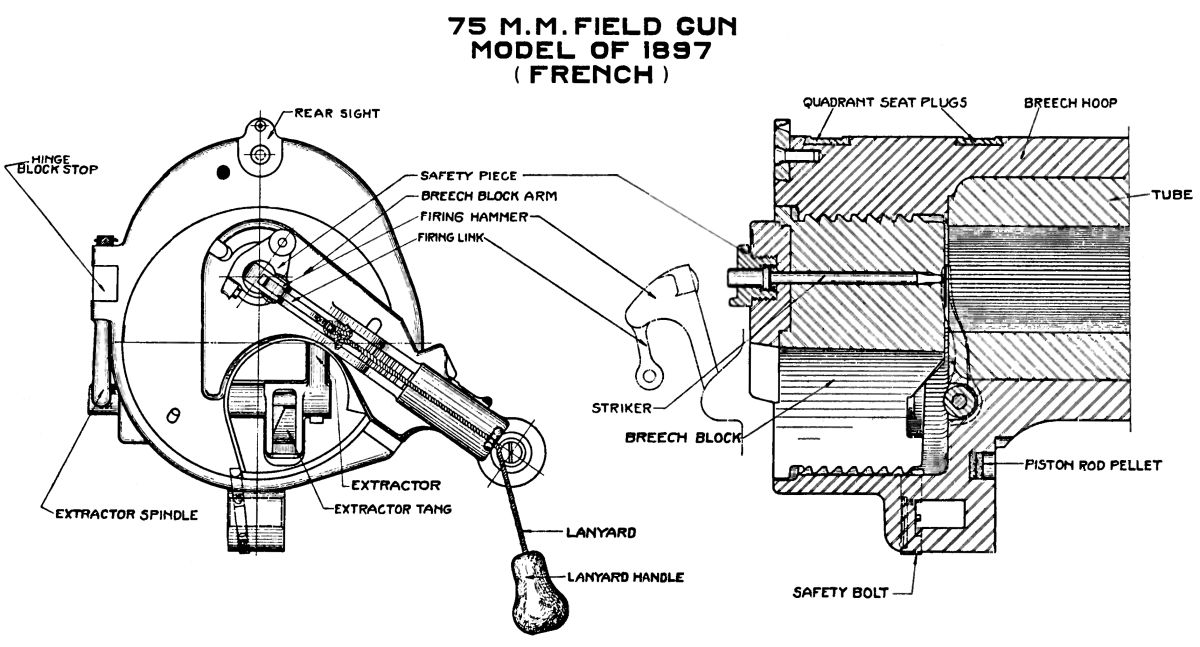
Drawing showing the Nordenfelt eccentric screw breech mechanism of the 75 mm Field Gun Model 1897 M1 (US designation)

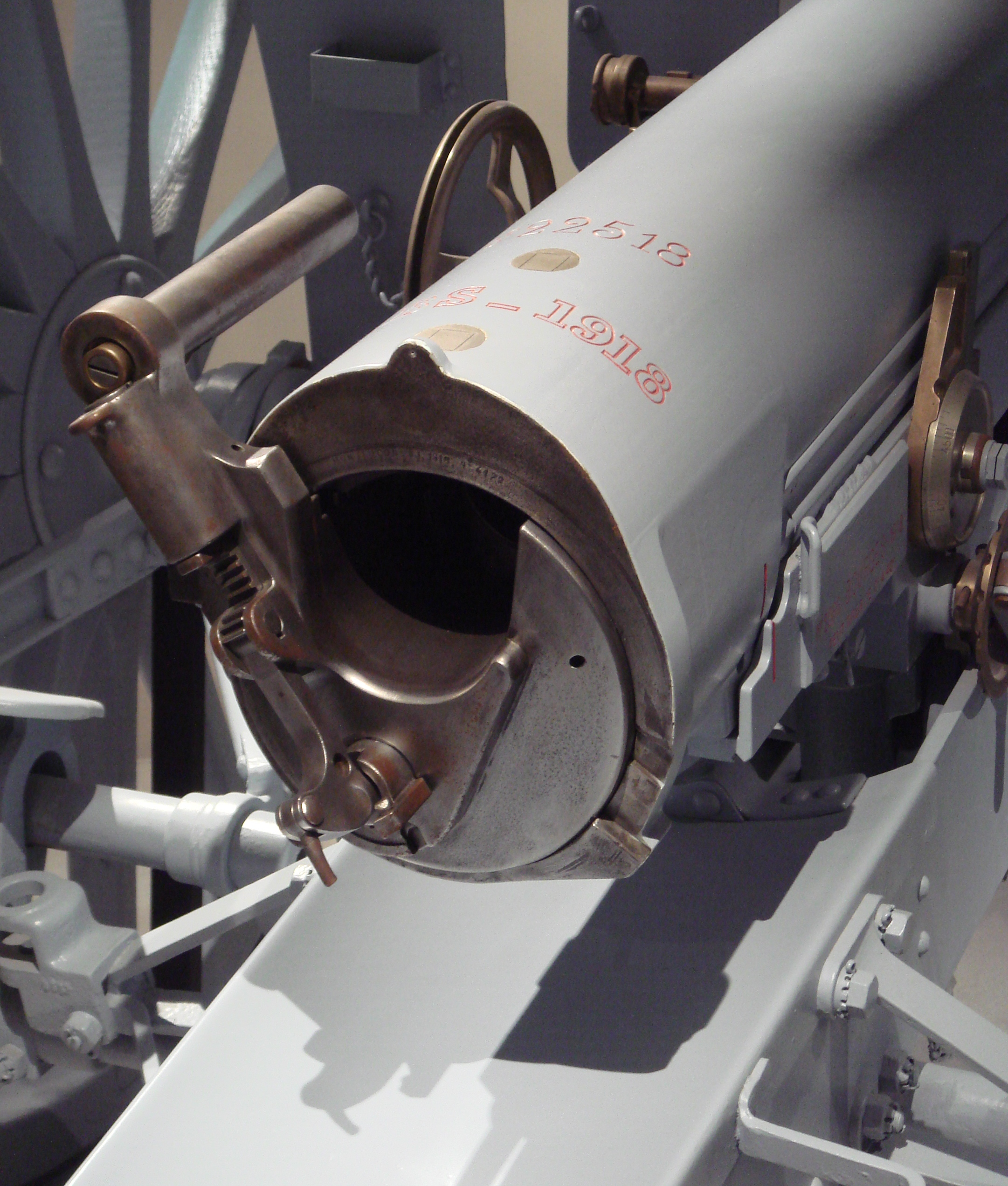
Breech of the Model 1897 in the open position

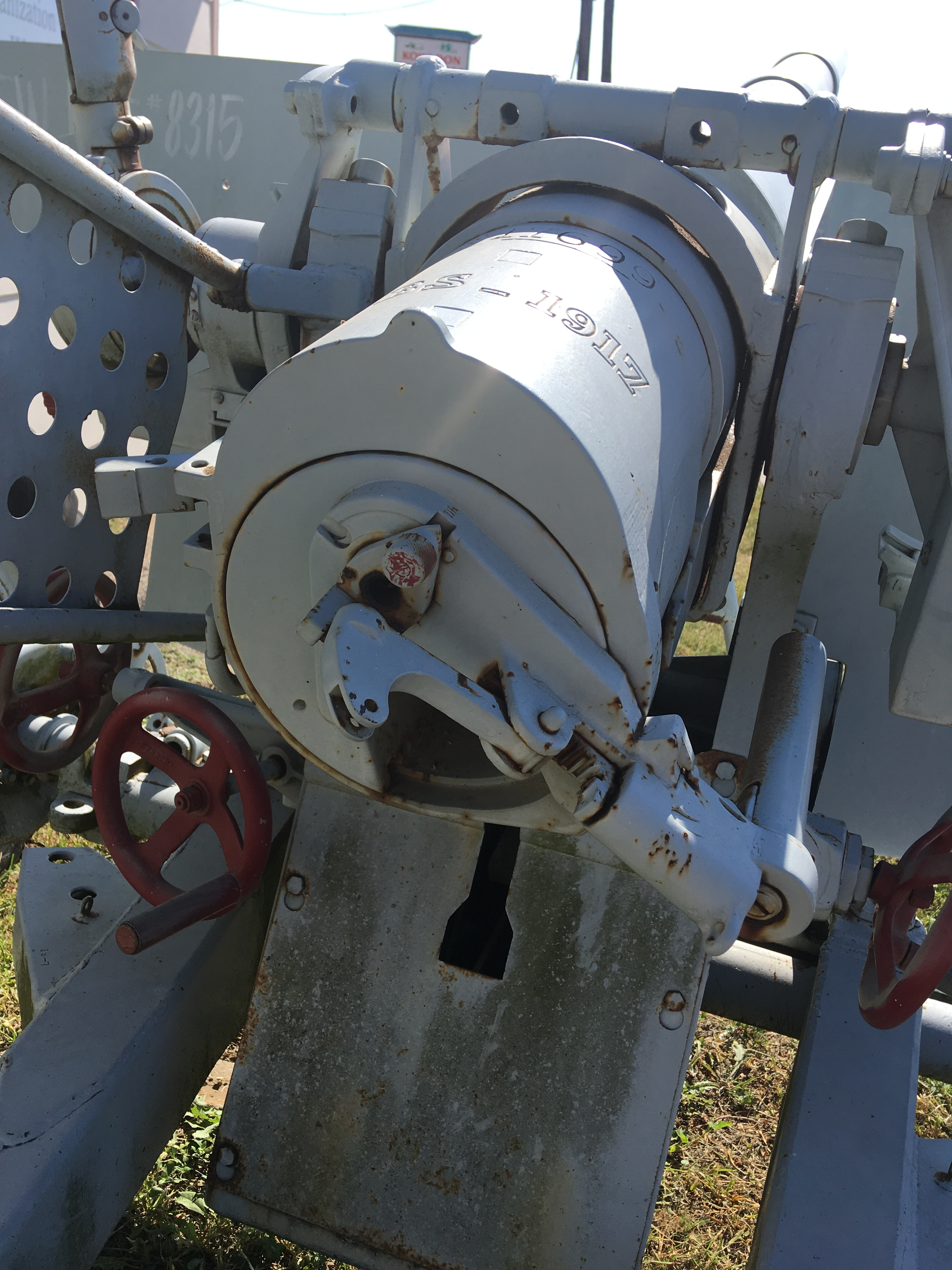
Breech of the Model 1897 in the closed position

=== Trapdoor breechblock ===
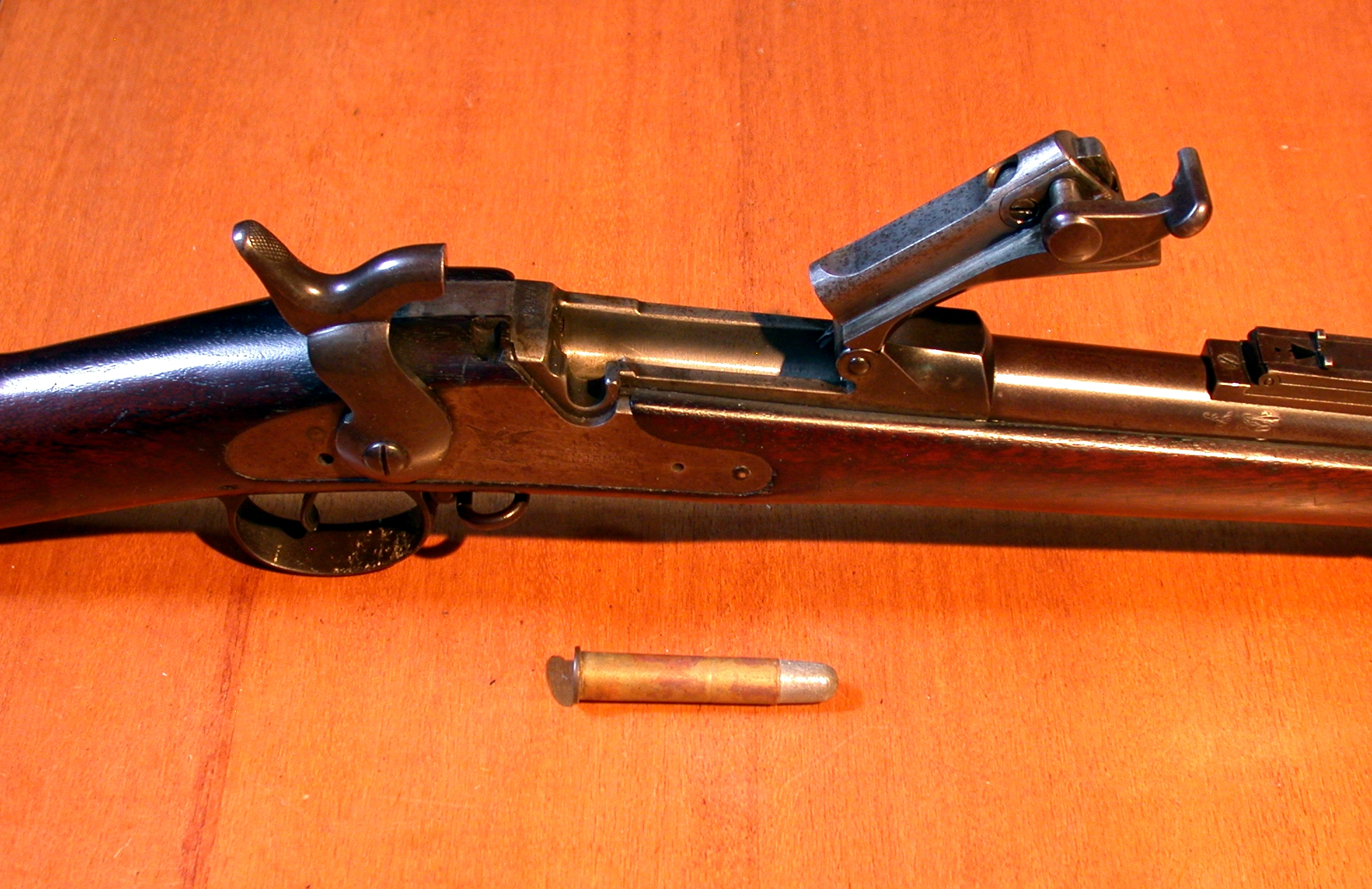
Springfield Model 1888, breech open

Commonly associated with the Springfield rifle, the breechblock is hinged above the breech face and lifts up like a trapdoor to expose the breech. The breech is locked by a catch operating at the end of the breechblock furthest from the hinge. It is similar in principle to a break-action.

=== Rolling-block ===
A rolling-block can be described as a quadrant which is hinged below the breech. The quadrant rotates through approximately 90° to provide access to the breech or close the breech. In the closed position, a number of different devices can be used to lock the quadrant and prevent it from opening. In the Remington Rolling Block rifle most closely associated with this type of breechblock, the hammer also has a quadrant which cams behind the breechblock and locks it.

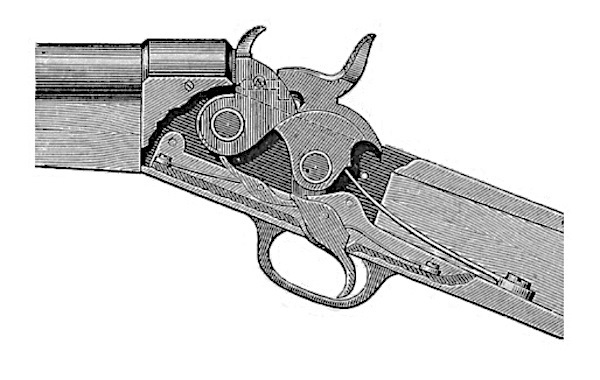
The Remington rolling-block breech

=== Peabody-Martini ===
Initially used in the Peabody rifle, it saw more widespread use in the Martini–Henry and the subsequent Martini–Enfield. It employs a breechblock with a rear hinged falling block design, in which the breech is opened by permitting the front of the breechblock to drop down while pivoting on its hinge. Firing force is transmitted through the knuckle of the hinge and does not act directly on the hinge pin. The breechblock design as has been called a falling or tilting block but omitting the role of the hinge can lead to ambiguities. It is also used in the Krag–Petersson rifle.

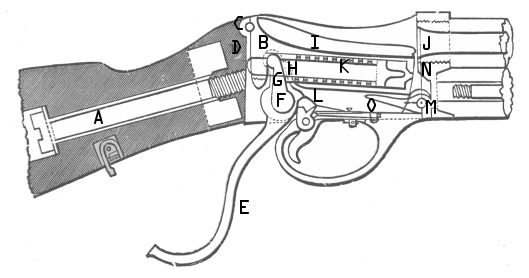
Section of the Martini–Henry

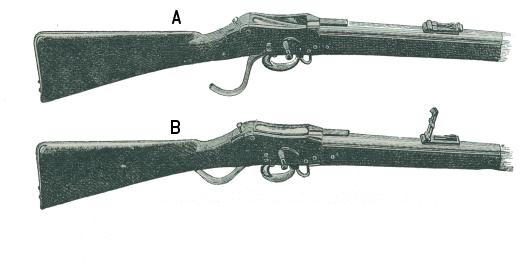
The Martini-Henry, showing the breech open and closed

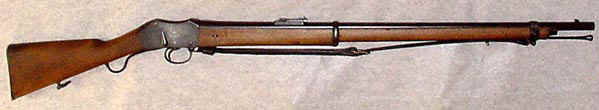
The Martini-Henry Mk 1

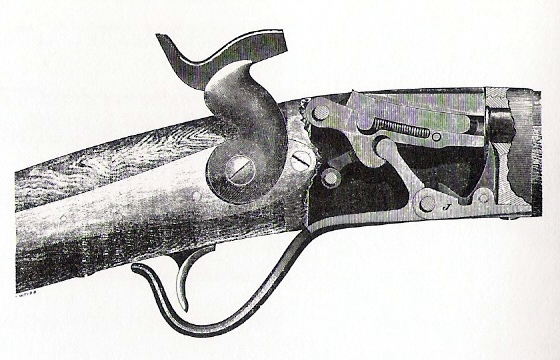
The Peabody rifle, which has an external hammer

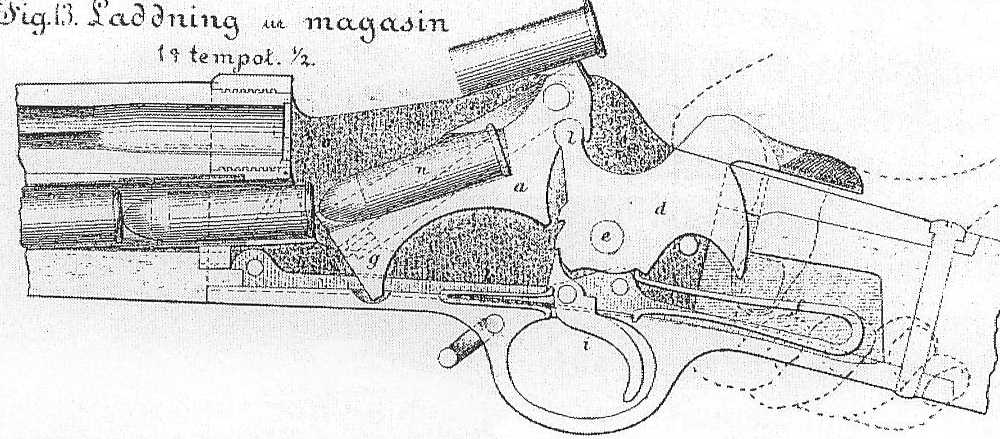
The Krag–Petersson rifle uses a rear hinged falling block. The opening and closing of the breech is operated by the hammer.

The Krag–Petersson rifle is fed from a tubular magazine under the barrel. On cocking, a new round is presented to the open breech but must be manually inserted into the chamber.

=== Tilting block ===
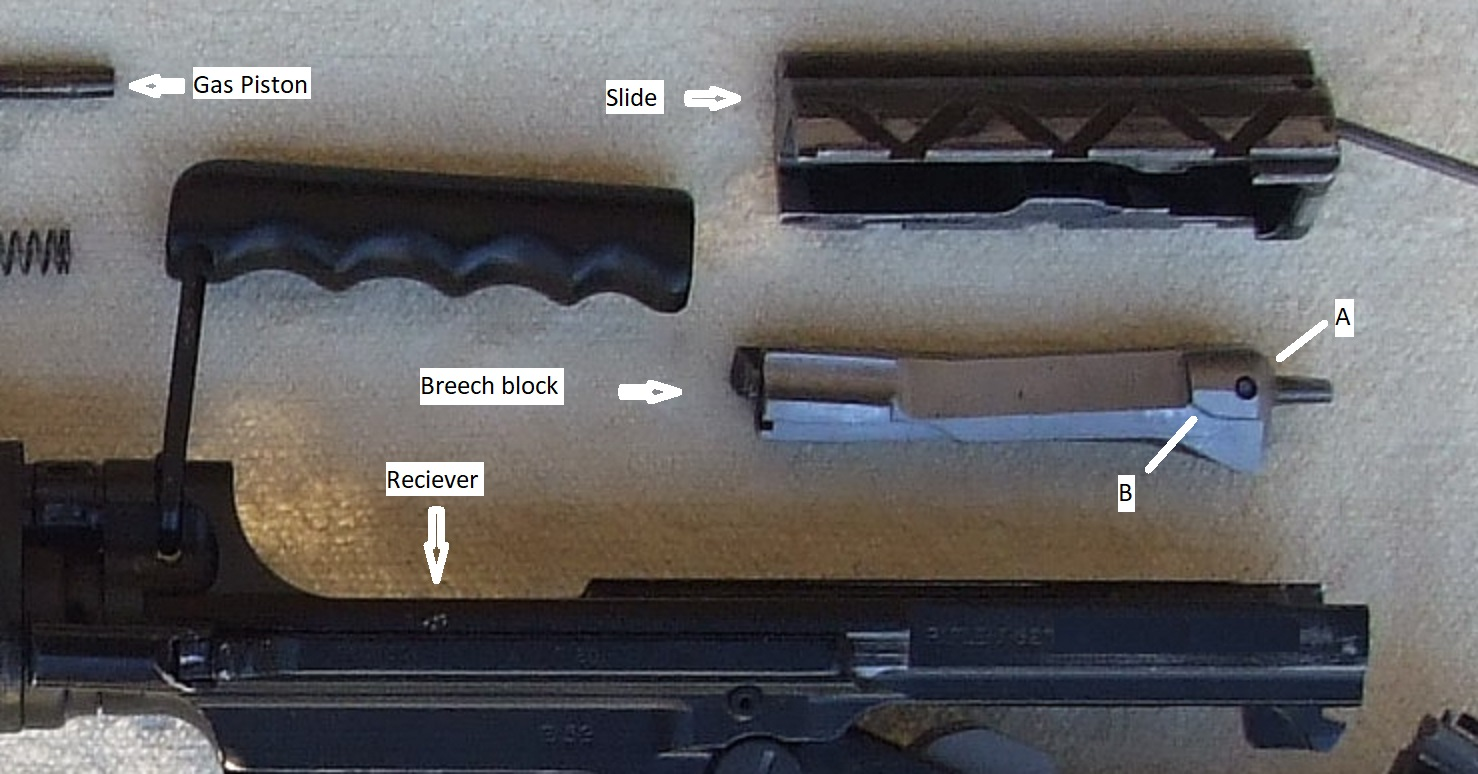
An L1A1 disassembled to show the tilting breechblock. The breechblock fits inside the slide. There is a chamfer (A) on the top rear of the breechblock and a corresponding internal chamfer in the slide. For the chamfer (B), there are corresponding inclines machined inside the slide. A return spring acts on the rod at the rear of the slide, pushing the slide forward. As the breech closes, the slide acts on the chamfer (A), to push the breechblock down into a recess in the receiver and lock the breech. Upon firing, the gas piston pushes the slide rearward. The ramp within the slide acts on chamfer (B), tilting the rear of the breechblock up to disengage it from the recess and unlock the breech.

As a tilting breechblock closes on the breech, it is tilted up at the rear but it drops into a recess at the end of its forward travel - thus locking the breech closed. Firing forces are transmitted to the locking shoulder at the rear of the recess. To unlock the breech, a slide or carrier moving rearward uses a wedge or ramp-like arrangement acting on the sides of the breechblock to tilt it up at the rear and lift it clear of the locking shoulder. The breechblock is then pulled rearward by the slide or carrier to expose the breech. In the closed position, the slide or carrier can also help locate the breechblock in its locking recess. The carrier or slide can be operated by lever or pump actions or by gas, for automatic and semiautomatic fire.

A tilting breechblock design is not confined to a tilt relative to the horizontal plane with the breechblock locking against the bottom part of the receiver (as described above). The FN Trombone uses a side locking design and the breechblock of the Bren gun locks against the top part of the receiver.

The M1895 Lee Navy is also of this type. The tilting action is achieved without a separate breechblock carrier but by the design of the cocking handle. When unlocking the breechblock, the cocking handle initially acts as a crank with a cam, which acts against the receiver to lift the rear of the bolt out of the locking recess. Further rearward pressure on the cocking handle then pulls the breechblock rearward.

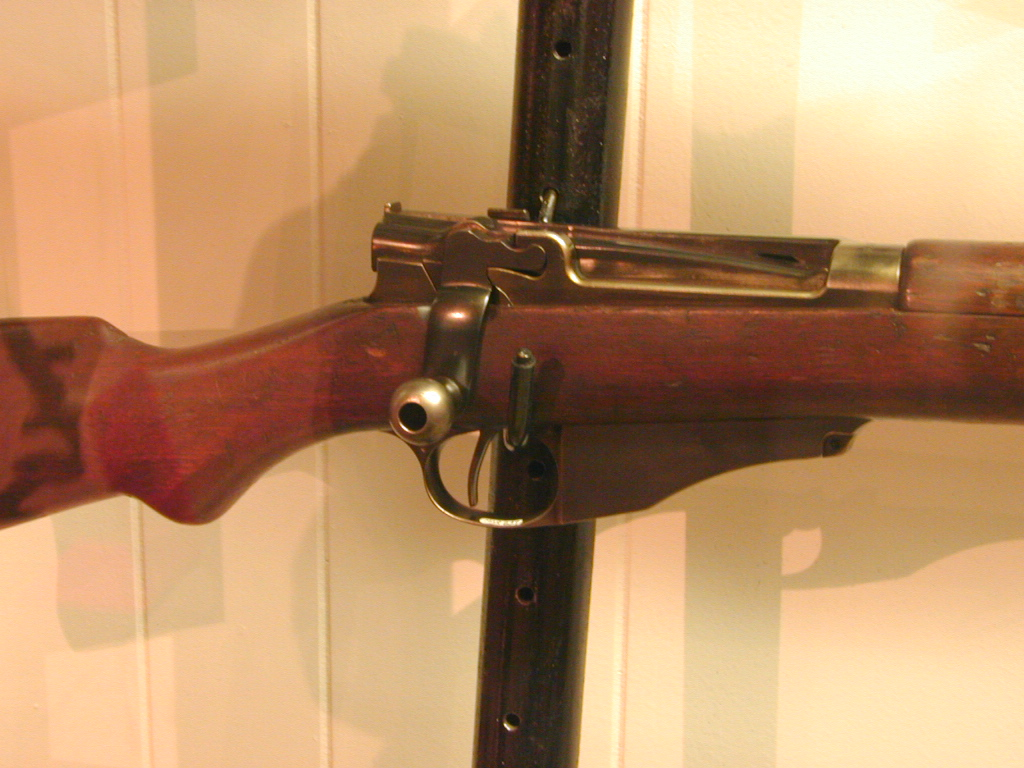
The M1895 Lee Navy

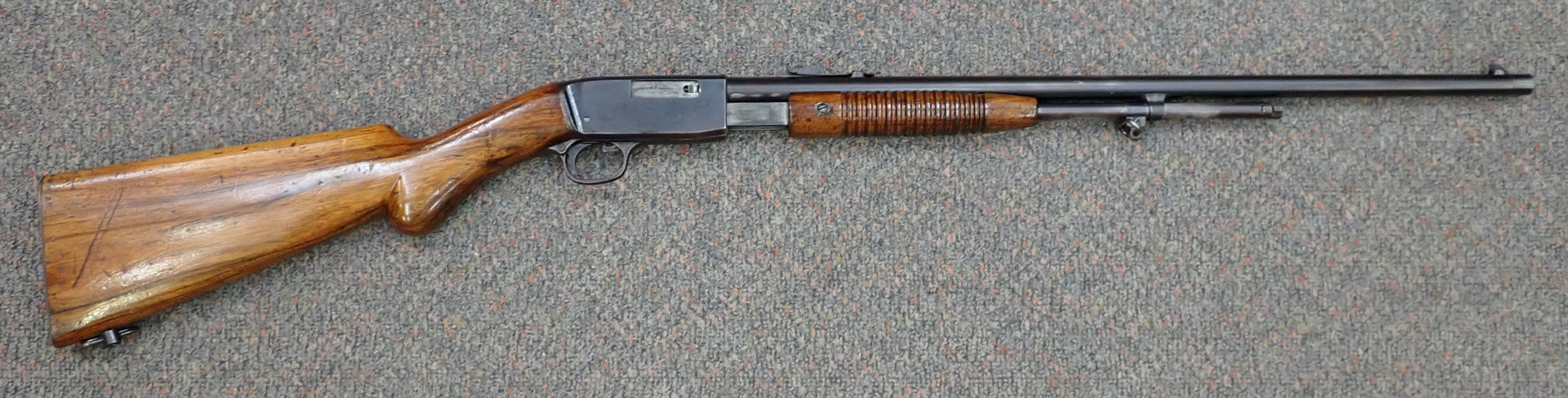
The FN Trombone is a pump-action rifle that uses a side-locking tilting block.

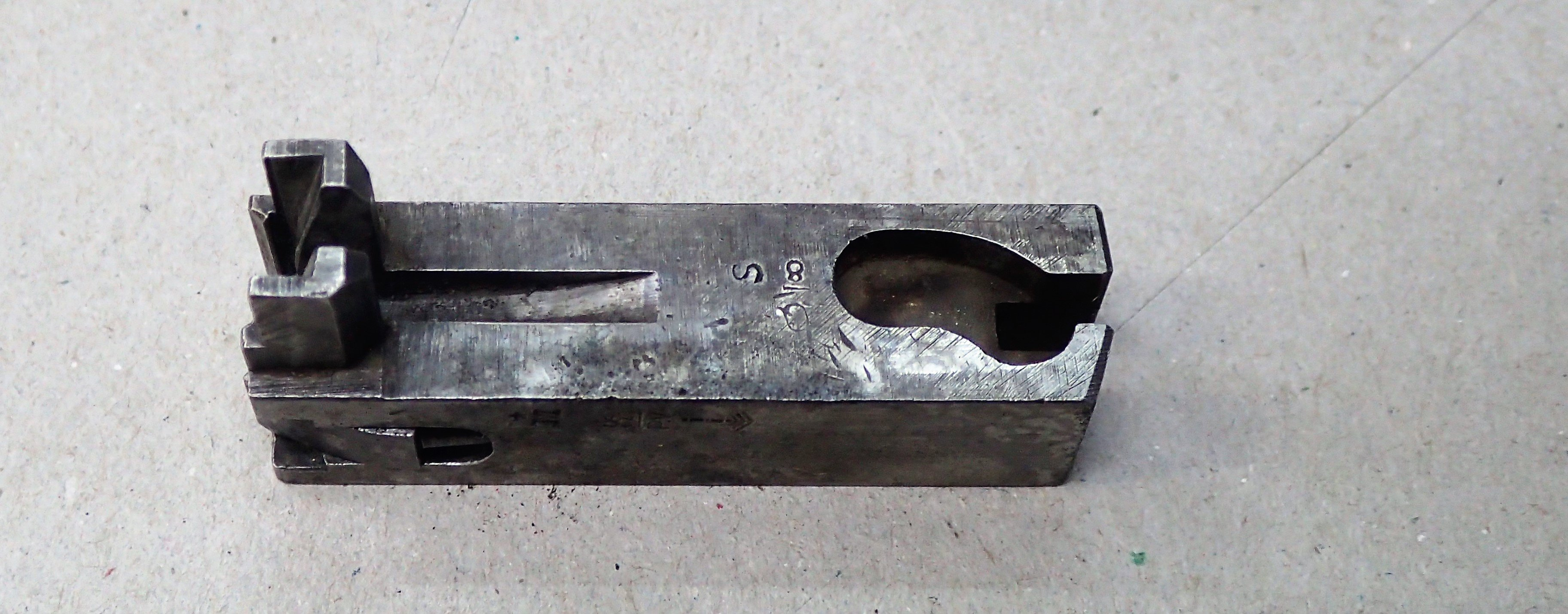
The underside of an FN Trombone breechblock. As the action is closed, the rear of the breechblock is pushed sideways to lock in a recess in the side of the receiver.

The slide of the FN Trombone (top view) is connected to the pump handle. The pin on the slide engages with the recess in the bottom of the breechblock to lock and unlock the breech.

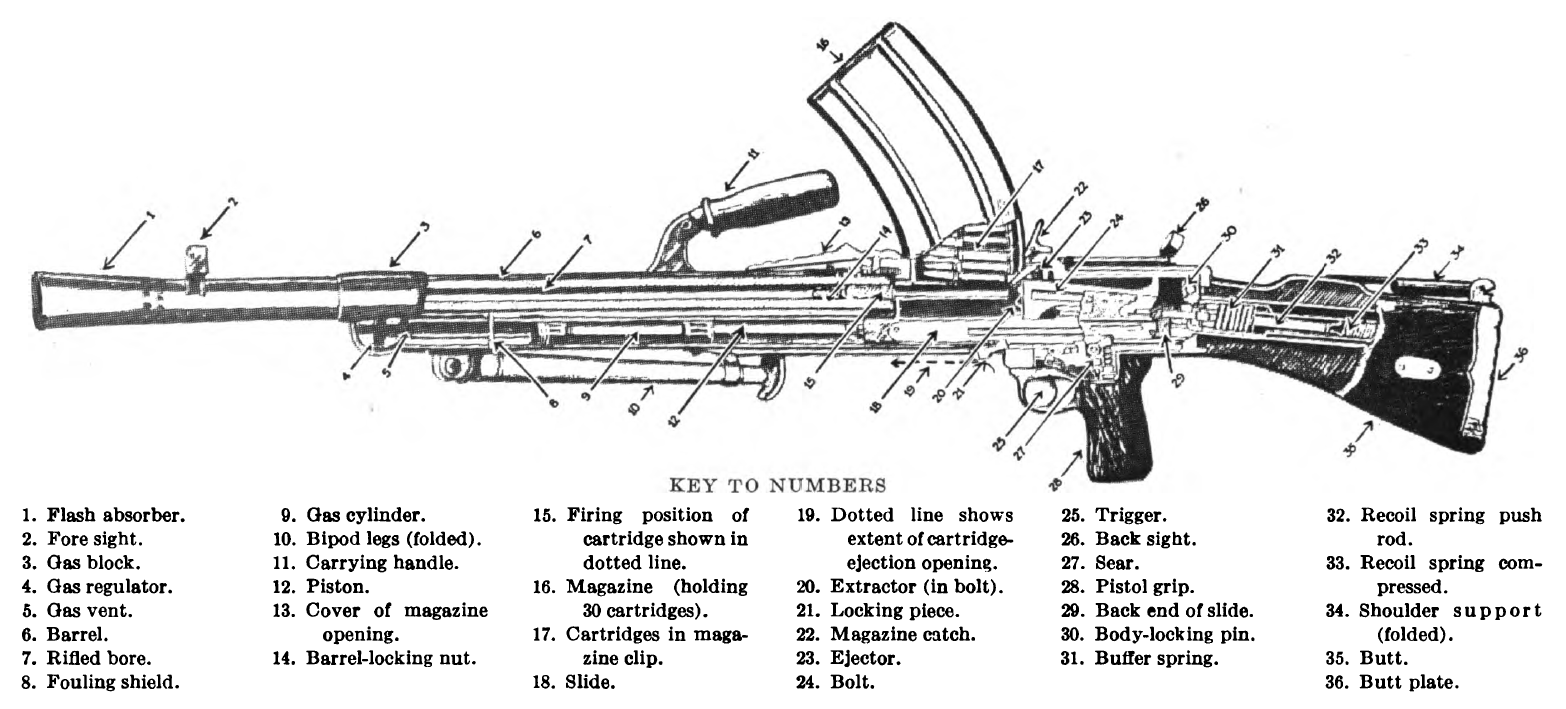
A cutaway drawing of the Bren gun. It fires from an open breech and is shown cocked, ready to fire. The Breechblock (24) is carried by the slide (18). The rear of the breechblock tilts up into a recess to lock it closed.

=== In-line ===
The breech is opened by the breechblock moving in-line with the axis of the barrel and is locked in the closed position by an obstruction such as a cam, wedge, pawl or levers. A roller lock is commonly associated with firearms produced by Heckler & Koch. This type of breechblock can be adapted to cycle by lever, cocking handle, gas or recoil. The mechanism is usually designed so that a single action unlocks and then withdraws the breechblock.

The Henry rifle and subsequent Winchester rifles use an arrangement of levers referred to as a toggle, similar in operation to locking pliers. The breechblock is held closed when the two levers forming the toggle are in-line.

The Mannlicher M1886 rifle is locked with a single pawl on the underside of the bolt assembly. The cocking handle is separate from the bolt and acts much like a bolt carrier. When the cocking handle is pulled rearward, it first lifts the pawl before retracting the bolt rearward. This system was adapted to recoil operation by Bernhard Müller in his 1902 prototype pistol and has subsequently been used in other pistols such as the Walther P38.

Flapper locking (as used in the Degtyaryov machine gun) uses metal plates (pawls) on either side of the breechblock that "flap out" like barbs on an arrow and lock into recesses in the receiver. The flaps can be retracted parallel to the block for unlocking.

The straight-pull Heym SR 30 uses ball bearings for locking, similar to an air fitting connector. The Blaser R93, another straight-pull action, is similar. It has a locking collet that consists claw-like segments instead of ball bearings. The multiple claws provide a large contact area to distribute load. These are arranged radially around the axis of the bolt. They extend to lock the bolt by engaging with an annular groove in the barrel behind the chamber and are retracted to unlock the bolt.

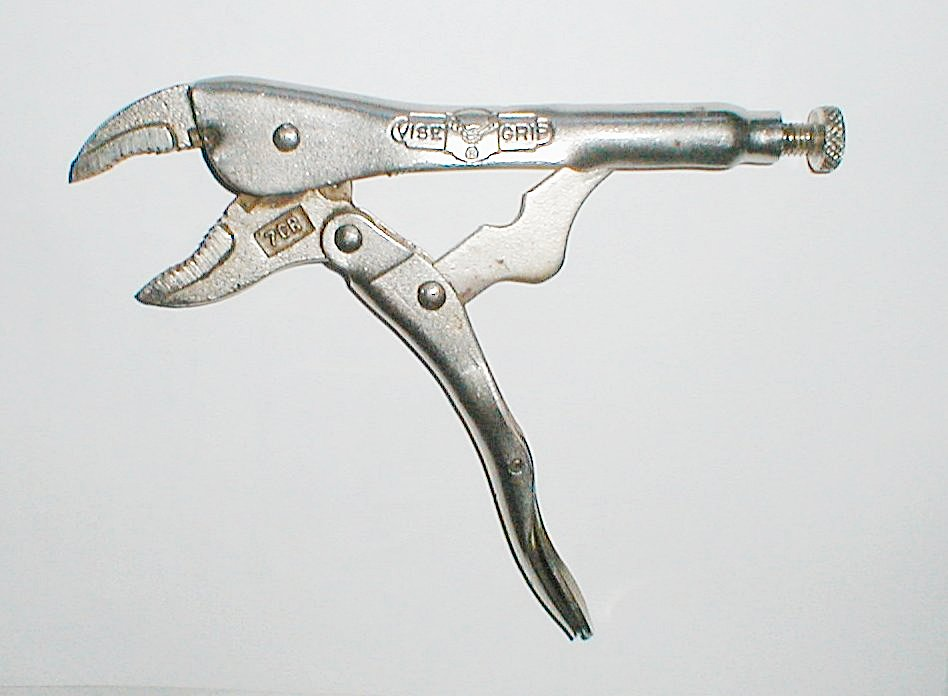
The toggle lock of many lever-action rifles is similar to the mechanism of locking pliers. The pliers lock when the toggle mechanism is pushed over-centre.

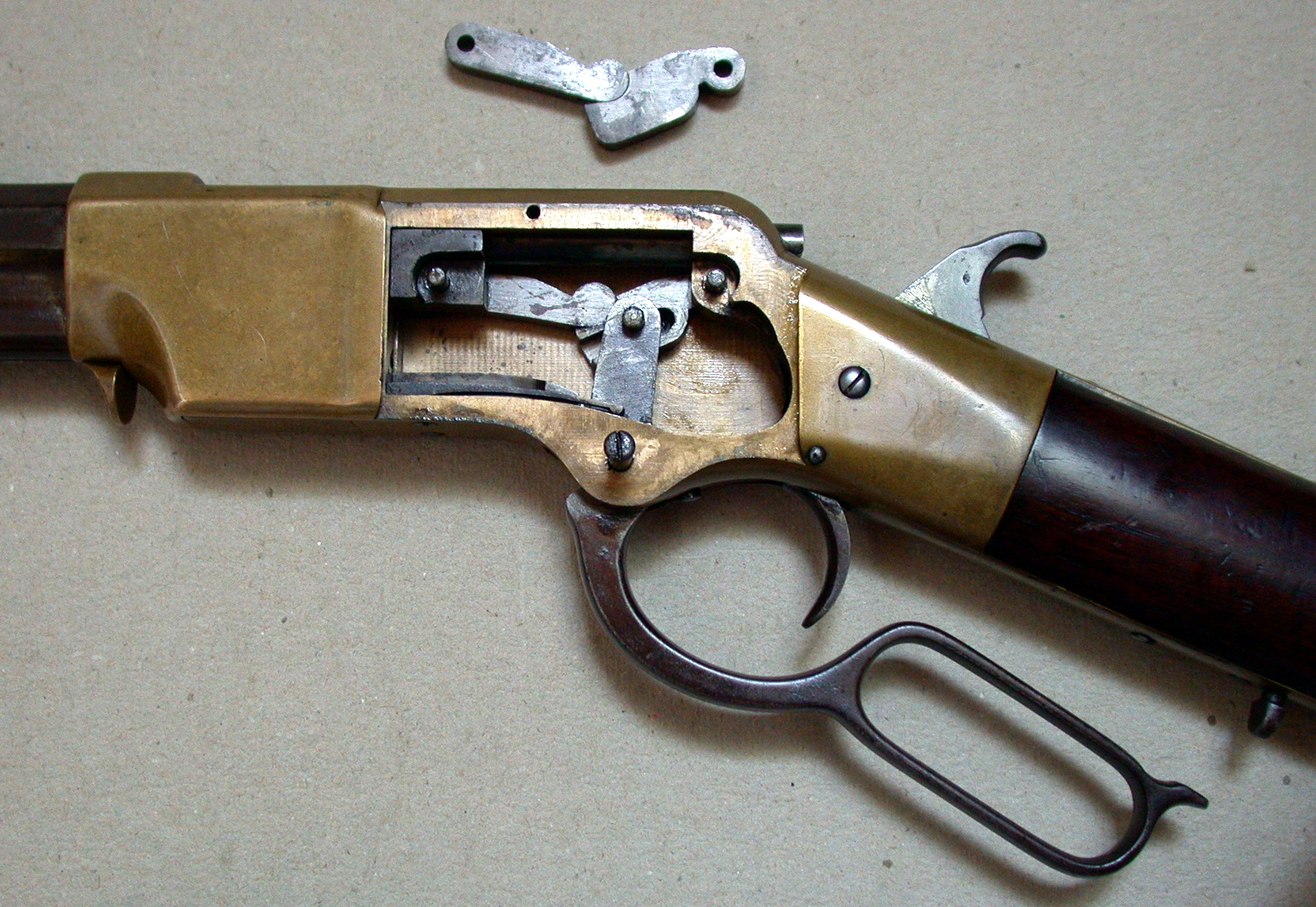
The Henry rifle uses a toggle to lock the breechblock in place.

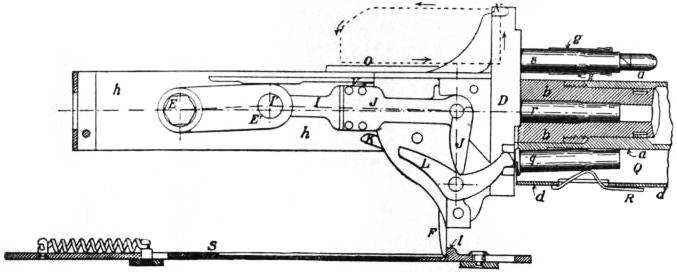
The Maxim gun employs a toggle-lock mechanism.

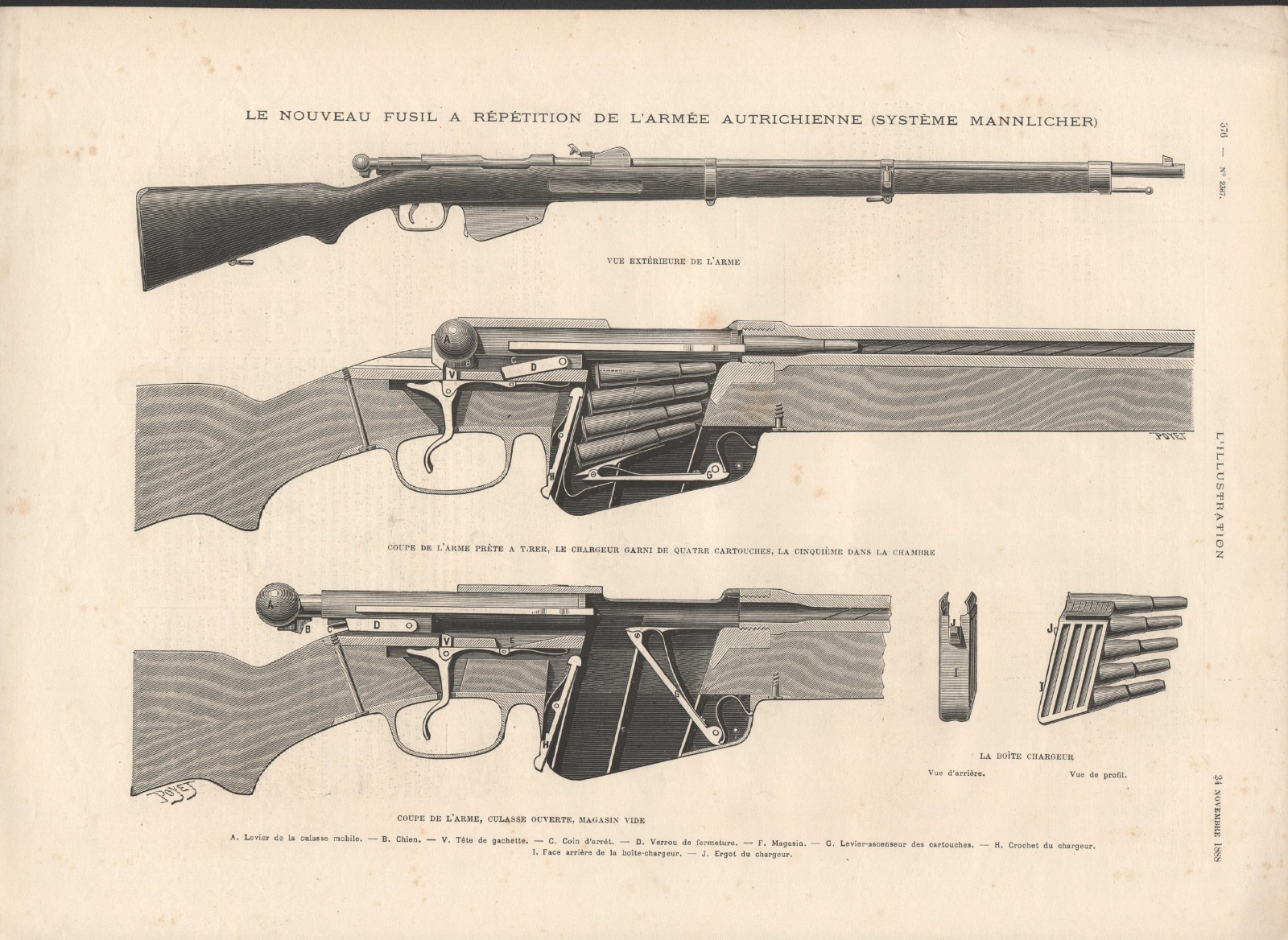
Drawing of Mannlicher M1886 showing the locking pawl on the underside of the bolt.

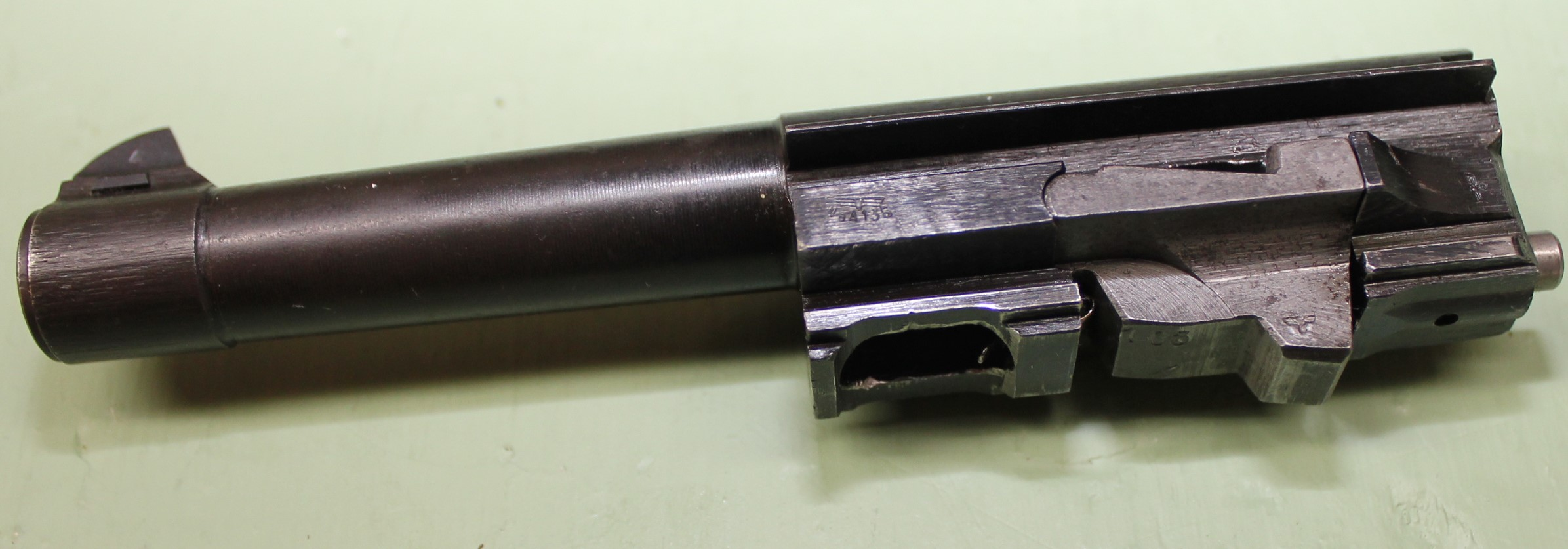
The Walther P38 employs a locking piece underneath the breech, similar to the Mannlicher M1886 rifle.

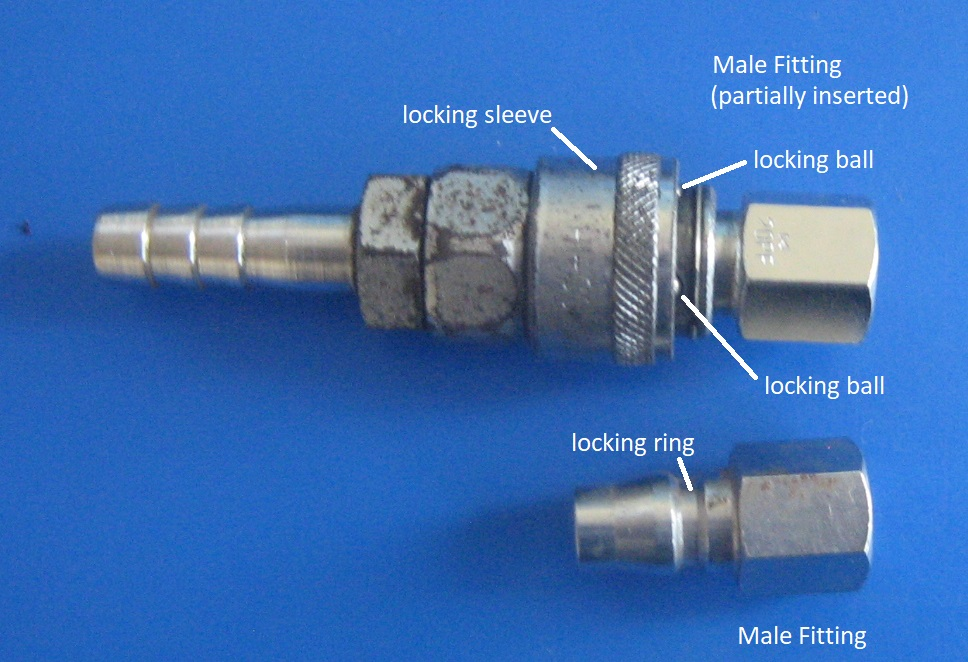
An air fitting locking mechanism. Roller or ball delay/locking mechanisms are similar in operation to this air fitting. In this case, the locking piece is a sleeve (i.e. outside) but the design can be transposed so that the locking piece acts from the inside position.

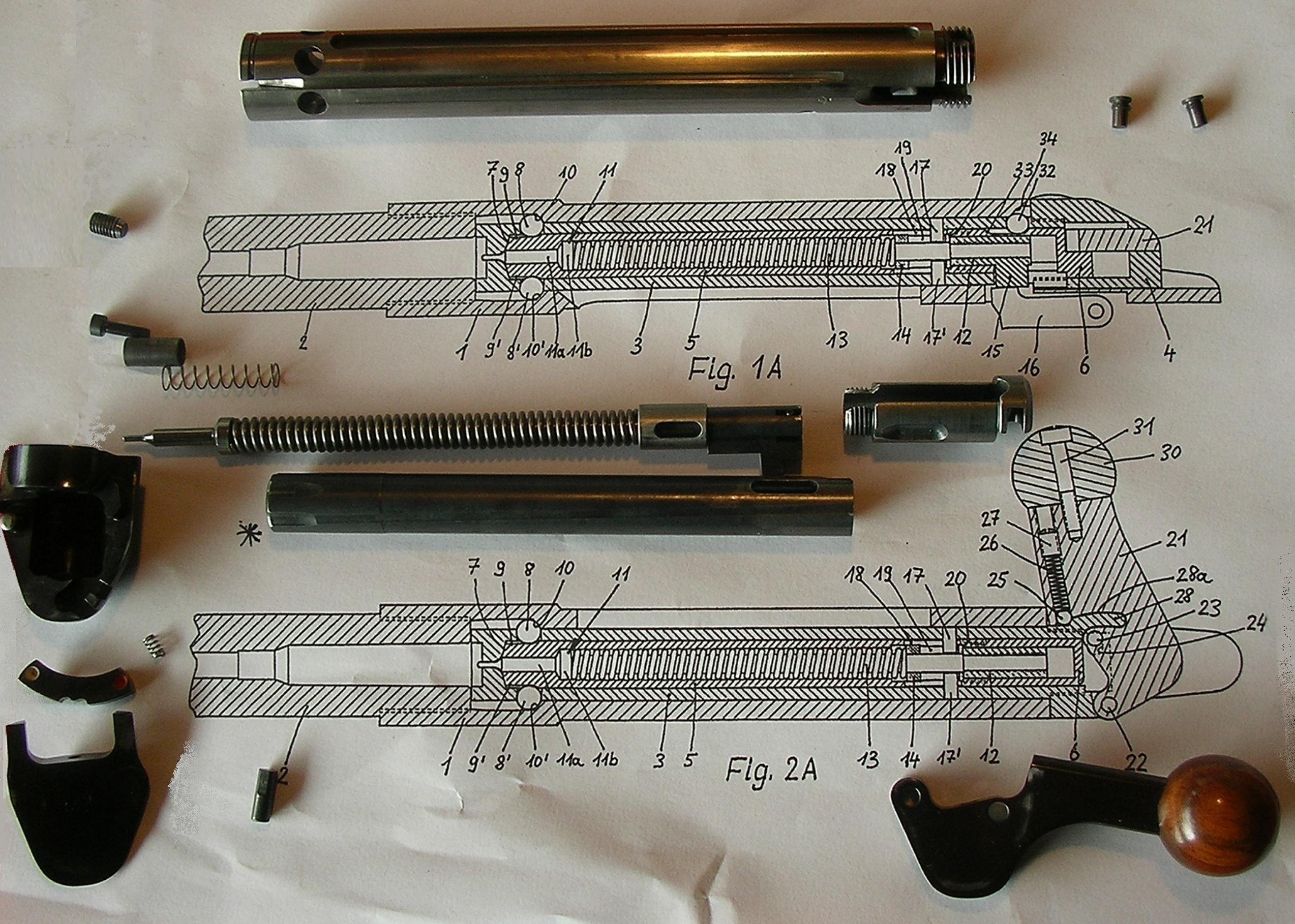
Disassembled bolt of the Heym SR 30

=== Blowback ===
Animation of simple blowback operation.

Blowback actions use an in-line breechblock in which the breech is never locked and is held closed by spring tension alone. The force of the discharge is contained by a combination of spring force and the mass of the breechblock. They are used in semiautomatic and automatic firearms using low-powered cartridges. It is common in semiautomatic rifles and pistol chambered for .22 cal rimfire cartridges and many submachine guns. A variation is blow forward operation, in which the breechblock is fixed and the barrel moves. Delayed blowback uses additional mechanical devices that retard or delay the rearward movement of the breechblock; however, the breechblock is not locked in place by such devices. It allows a lighter mechanism compared with simple blowback.

=== Floating actions ===
In most longarms, the barrel is firmly attached to the receiver and does not move relative to the receiver during operations. Most semiautomatic pistols firing the higher powered pistol cartridges use a locked-breech design. The action is manually cycled by moving the slide rearward. The slide contains the breechblock and is initially locked to the barrel so that the combined assembly move together. A short movement trips the mechanism to unlock the barrel from the slide assembly, allowing the breech to open. When fired, recoil results in the same action. In many instances, the barrel and breechblock remain in-line. In the Browning Hi-Power and Colt's M1911 pistol, the barrel is tilted slightly to release it from interlocking ribs, so in this respect, it may be likened to a tilting breechblock, even though it is the barrel and not the breechblock that tilts.

This type of floating configuration and recoil operation is not confined to pistols and may be found in machine guns and auto-firing cannons.

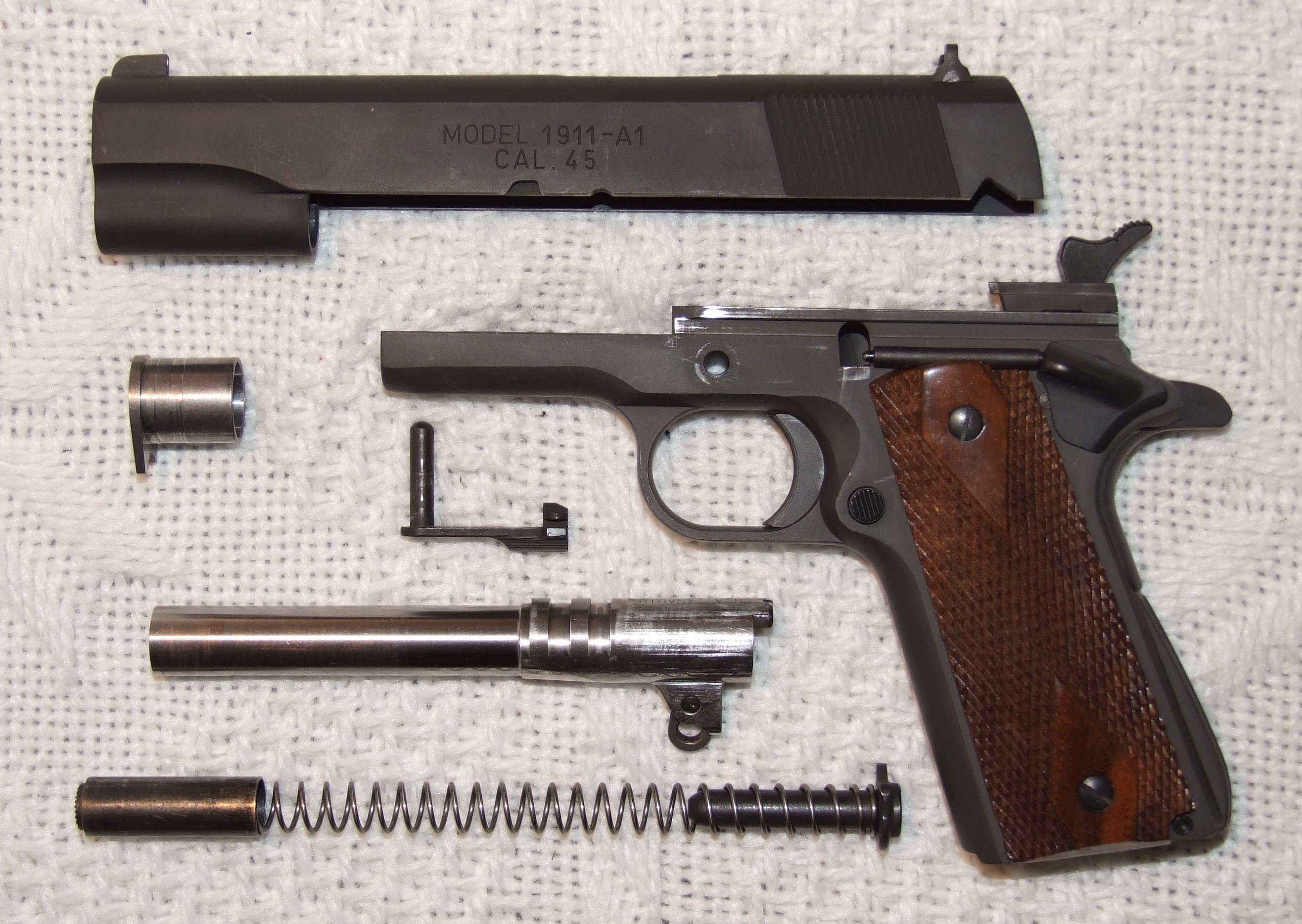
A M1911A1 pistol disassembled and showing the locking grooves on the barrel.

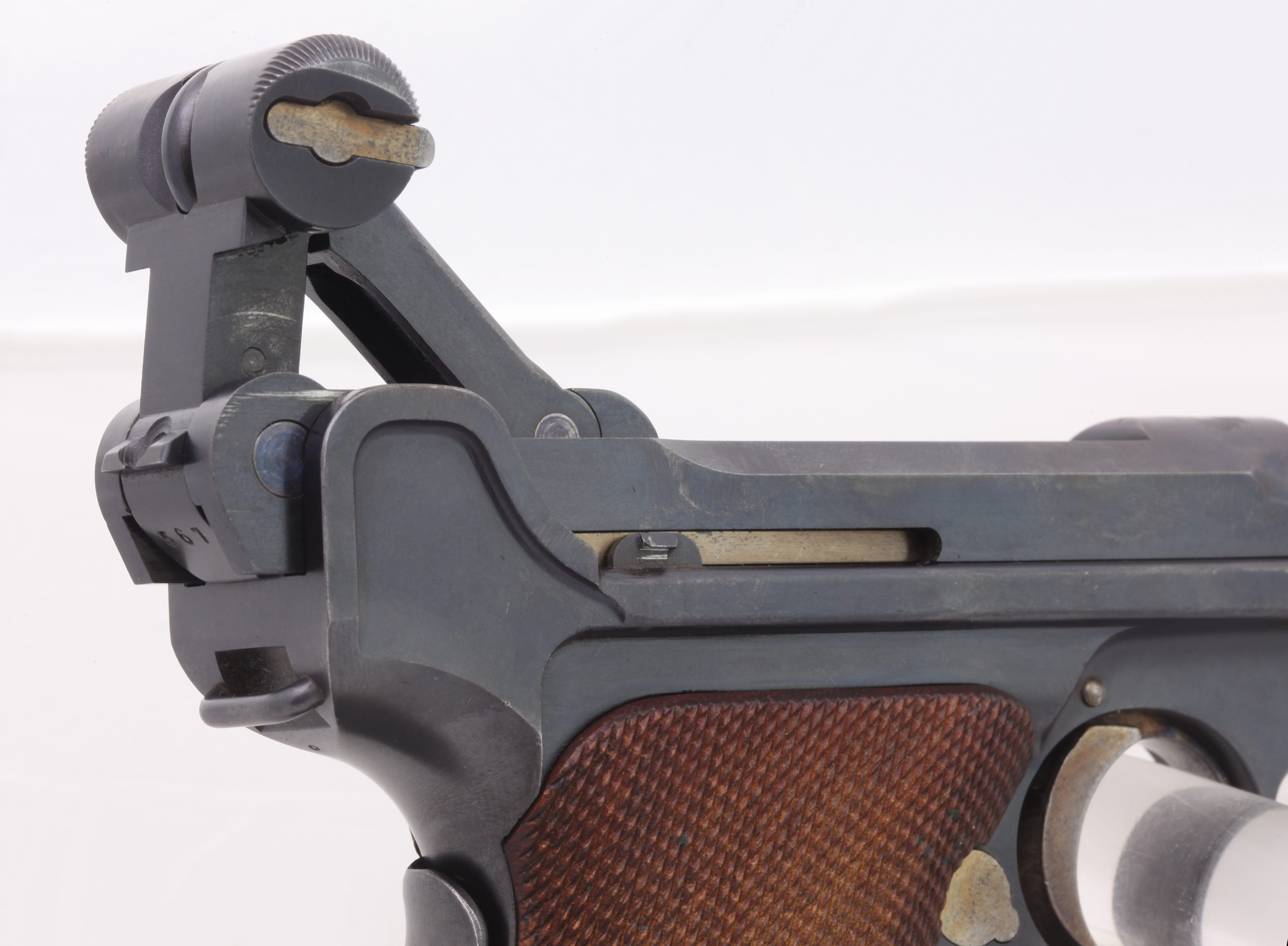
Swiss Parabellum Model 1900 Luger with breech opened, showing the jointed, toggle, locking arm in its most bent position.

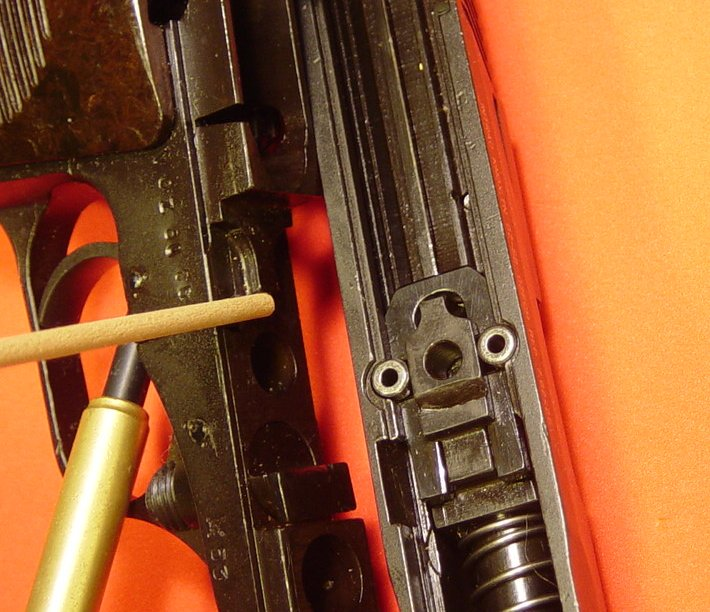
Roller locks in the CZ 52 pistol. When fired, slide and barrel move rearward but the locking piece in the slide is held by the tab indicated by the pointer.

=== Interrupted screw ===
Perhaps a variation on the rotating bolt, an interrupted screw provides greater strength than simple lugs while requiring only a partial rotation to release the breechblock. The Welin breechblock is such a design and is used on weapons with calibres from about 4 in (100 mm) and larger in diameter.

The 1888 Henri-Pieper, Ross rifle Mk III, Thompson Autorifle and FN CAL use multi-thread locking lugs.

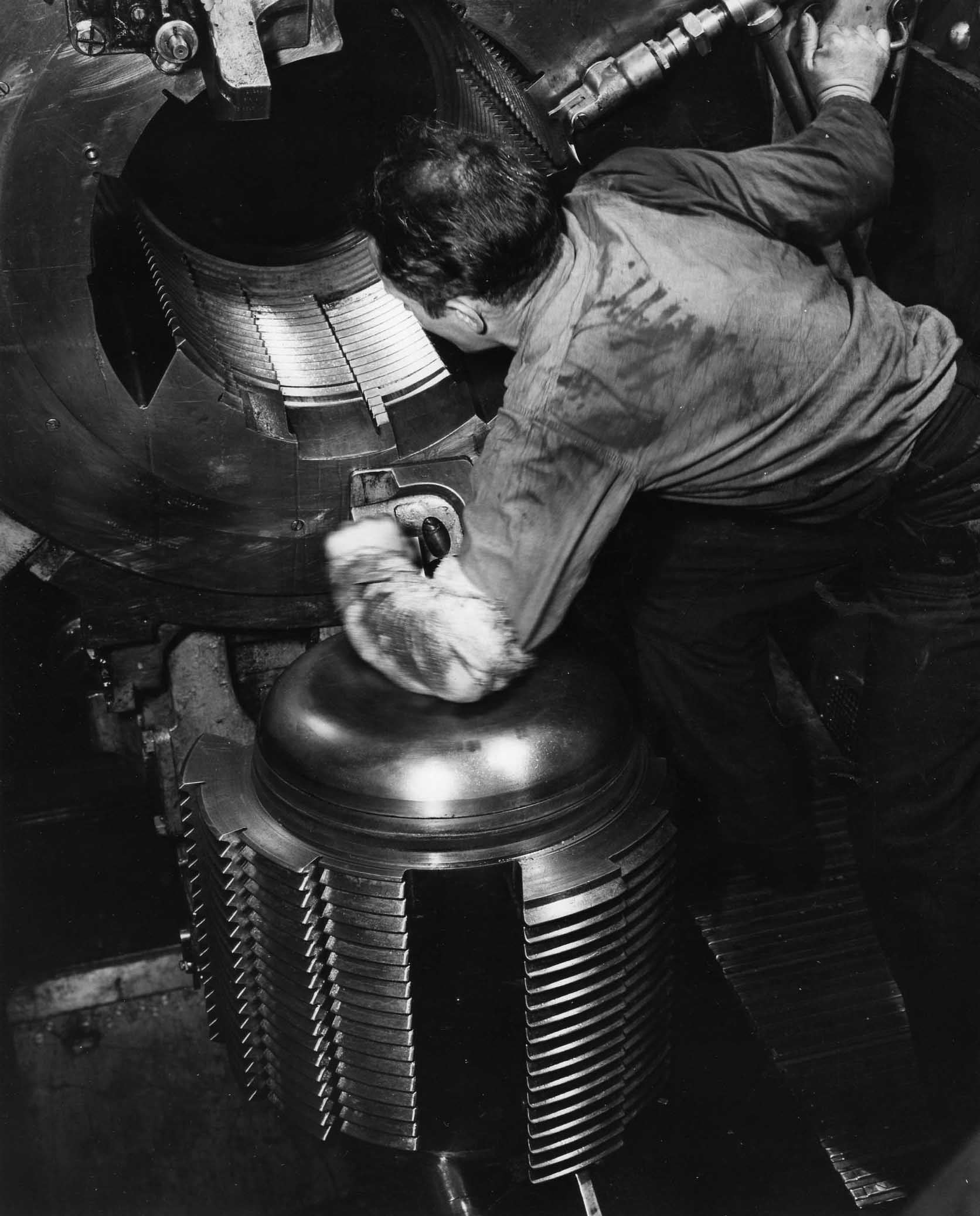
Welin breechblock of a 16-inch Mk 6 gun on USS Alabama (BB-60), 1943. Note the four separate thread "steps" on the block which engage with matching steps in the breech when the block is swung up and inwards and then rotated slightly clockwise. The design allows thread to be machined on four-fifths of the circumference but requires only a one-fifth turn to disengage. A conventional interrupted thread would have thread on only half of its circumference and would need to be much longer to achieve the same strength.

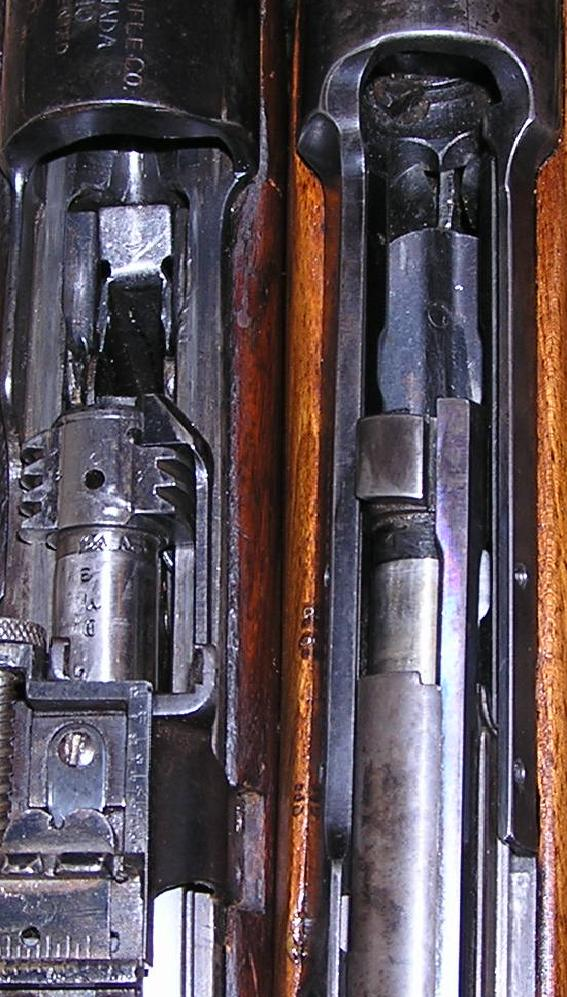
Mechanism comparison between Ross Mk III (1910) with multi-thread locking lugs and Mk II** (1907) with two solid lugs, similar to a Mauser 98

=== Falling screwed breechblock ===
The Ferguson rifle used a tapered screw plug inserted perpendicular to the axis of the barrel. It was charged with ball and powder and required only one rotation to permit loading. While novel and effective, cost was a factor for its limited acceptance.

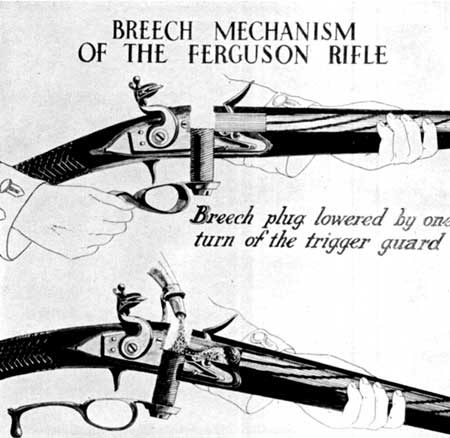
Ferguson Rifle

=== Reversed chamber ===
An unusual reverse chamber has been used on firearms such as the Burnside carbine, Rikhter R-23 and T168 autocannons.

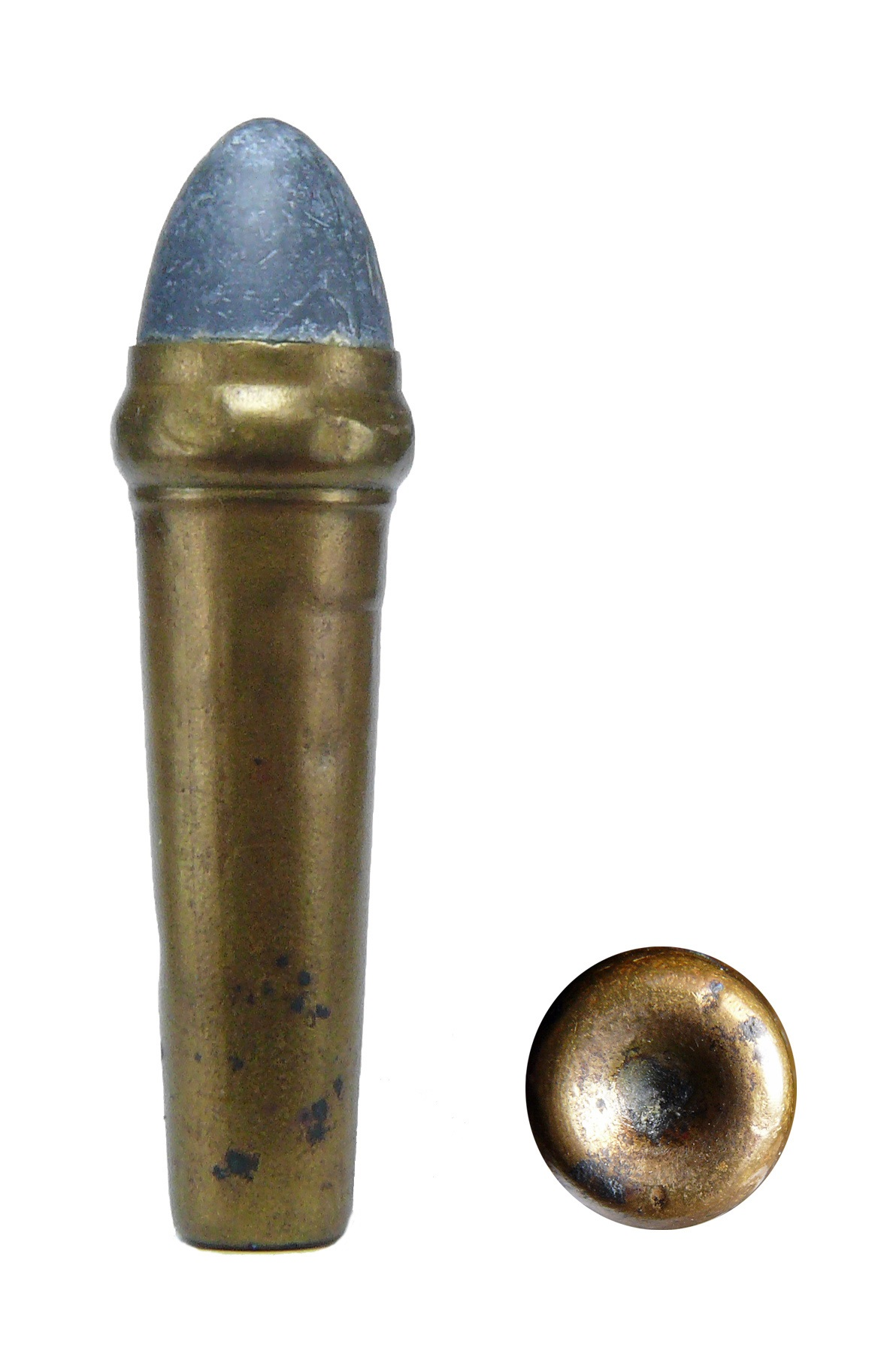
Reverse chambered .54 Burnside cartridge

== See also ==
- Category:Firearm actions
