= Tarpley carbine =

Tarpley Carbine
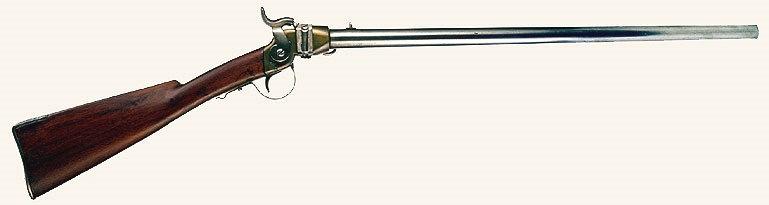
- Tarpley carbine displayed at the National Museum of American History
- Type: Carbine
- Place of origin: Confederate States

Service history
- Used by: Confederate States
- Wars: American Civil War

Production history
- Designer: Jere H. Tarpley
- Designed: 1863
- Manufacturer: Confederate Arms Factory, Greensboro, NC; J. F. Garrett & Company
- Produced: 1863-1864
- No. built: c. 400

Specifications
- Cartridge: .52 bullet
- Caliber: 0.52 in (13 mm)
- Action: Side-hinged breechblock

The Tarpley Carbine was a Confederate weapon produced and used during the American Civil War; however, it was not produced in great numbers. The Tarpley Carbine was a breechloader, and was comparable in this sense to the Sharps Rifle and Carbine more widely used by the Union.

On Civil War Artillery, there are some notes about the Carbine's manufacture:

"The breech-loading carbine was invented and patented in Greensboro, N.C. by Jere H. Tarpley. He received a C.S.A. patent on February 14, 1863, and his name appears on the barrel tang. He joined J. &F. Garrett & Co. to make carbines for the state of North Carolina. The carbines were made for about one year with their production amounting to only a few hundred. The carbine had a unique design which enabled this arm to be made with a file. The frame was unfinished brass with a copper color. The barrel was blued and the hammer was case hardened. The major flaw in the carbine was that it does not have a gas seal to prevent the escape of highly erosive gases between the breech-block and the barrel when fired. With each firing, the gap between the breech-block and the barrel would be larger. The carbine used paper ammunition. Although the carbine was made mainly for the state, it was also sold commercially. It is the only Confederate firearm sold to the public. The Tarpley was attractive in appearance, but it was not very serviceable. Clap, Gates & Co. was ten miles from the Garrett operation in Greensboro. The hammer and other parts could have been supplied by Clapp, Gates & Co." Dates of production, 1863-1864, total production, 'few hundred'."

Anthony and Hills Pictorial History Confederate Longarms and Pistols
