= FN Trombone =

FN "Trombone"
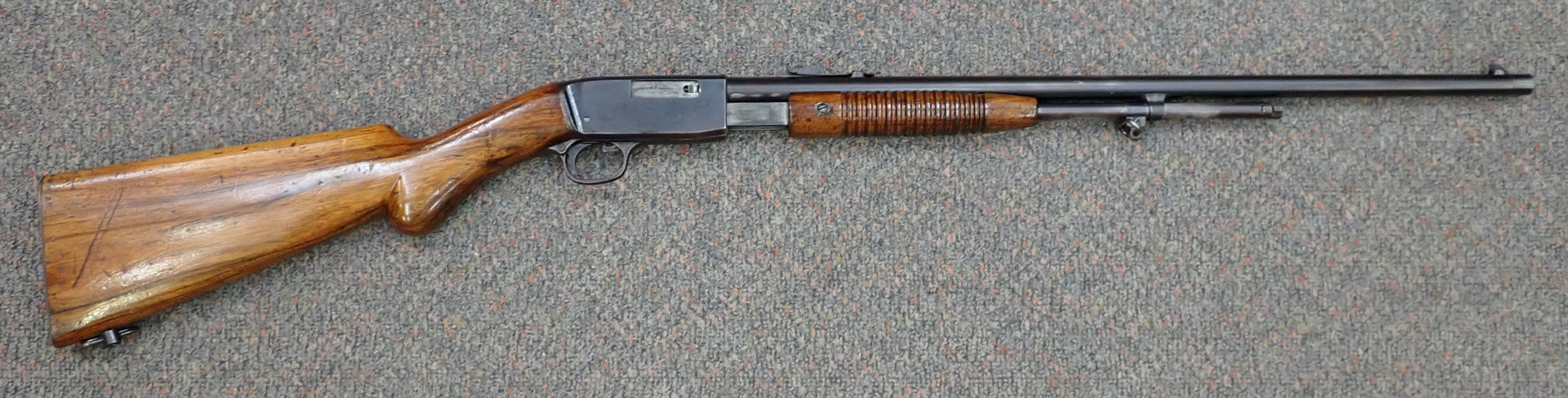
- FN "Trombone"
- Type: Rifle
- Place of origin: Belgium

Production history
- Designer: John Browning
- Designed: 1919
- Manufacturer: Fabrique Nationale d'Herstal
- Produced: 1922-1974
- No. built: 150,000
- Variants: See text

Specifications
- Mass: 4.4 lb (2.0 kg)
- Length: 39 1/4 in (1,000 mm)
- Barrel length: 20 in (510 mm)
- Caliber: .22 Short, .22 Long, .22 Long Rifle
- Action: Pump-action
- Feed system: 11-round tubular magazine
- Sights: dovetail front and elevation-adjustable rear

The FN Browning Trombone is a pump-action long takedown rifle designed by John M. Browning in 1919. It was produced by FN Herstal, who made a total of 150,000 from 1922 to 1974. It was imported into the U.S. by Browning Arms. Models manufactured post 1969 had a product code W.

The stocks of early models were susceptible to cracking, sometimes attributed to the shape of the receiver; later models, such as the dovetail scope variant, appeared to solve this problem. The pump grip of all models is susceptible to cracking, the wood between the magazine and barrel being especially thin.
