= Gun serial number =

Unique identifier of a firearm

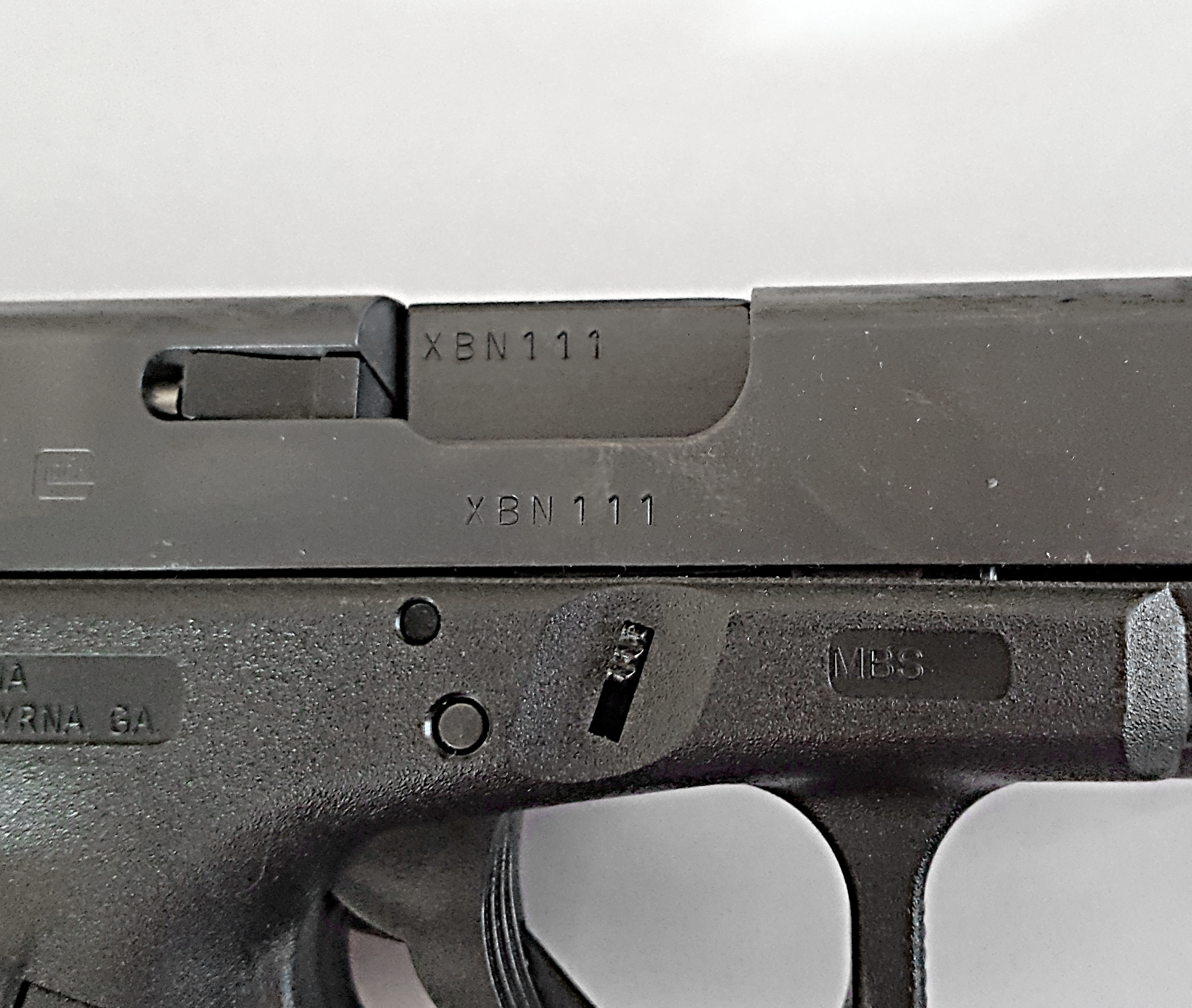
The serial number of this pistol is located under the dust cover on the frame, on the barrel, and on the slide.

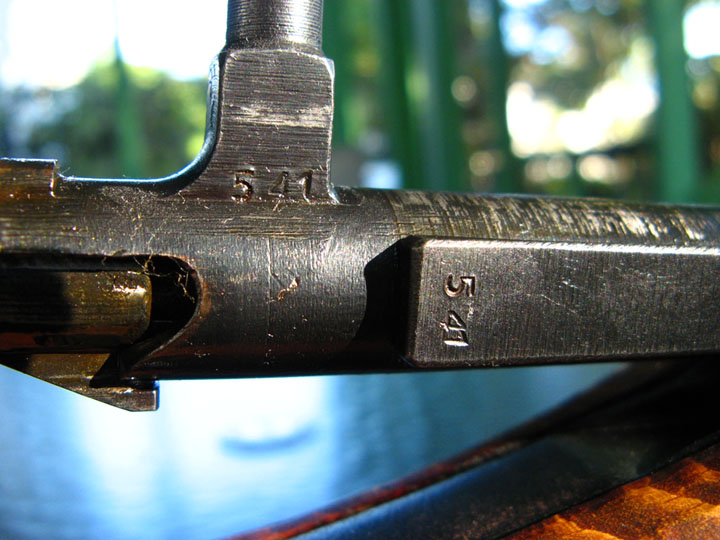
The bolt of an Arisaka military rifle, which carries identifiers matching the main serial number which is on the receiver

A gun serial number is a unique identifier assigned to a singular firearm. (Note: "A correct make code is essential to retrieve information from the system and is often the most difficult component to identify. An NCIC code manual is essential, as there are hundreds of make codes. They often don’t seem logical, such as the code for Bersa (AEI). Don’t guess. Read the pistol carefully; differences like American Derringer Corp. versus American Derringer Co. require different codes. The most perplexing problems arise in coding imported pistols, which can have as many as four different makers marked on one gun. The general rule is to use the original maker rather than an importer. One importer may assemble guns of the same caliber and serial number from different original makers such as Interarms Star (STA) and Helwan (MDI), both having seven-digit serial numbers on 9mm semi-automatic pistols (PI).)

There is no international uniformity in gun serial numbers. Besides a widespread numerical base, they may contain letters and other typographical symbols, or may consist entirely of a character string; positioning and form of such identifiers is idiosyncratic.

The legal requirement for affixing a serial number to firearms is a relatively recent requirement, and usually applies to firearms manufactured domestically or which are imported. Gun serial numbers are used in gun registration and are usually linked to an owner who is usually required to hold a firearms license. In the US, federal law requires registered gun dealers to maintain records of gun serial numbers and then to report them when they are sold but federal law also prohibits creation of a national register. Another form of serial number is microstamping, where the firing pin and breach face are engraved to create unique markings on the ejected cartridge; this is a legal requirement for handguns in the state of California. It should also be noted that microstamping technology does not exist at this time, making it impossible to use on handguns.

Firearms without a serial number are commonly called unmarked firearms. Firearms with removed serial numbers are generally illegal. There are forensic techniques for recovering serial numbers after they have been removed.

== History ==
Most individual manufacturers habitually put serial numbers on the weapons they produce. Such numbers can be used to ascertain the name of the manufacture, place and date of manufacture. At least for some manufacturers, a serial number can unlock myriad details about the weapon. An example is the Winchester Repeating Arms Company; their records may not be complete. As they note:

There are many "legends" about why the historic serial number records for Winchester rifles and shotguns are not complete or why they are not always verifiable. A few reasons cited are:

1. A fire at the factory
2. Inadvertent destruction (during office cleaning)
3. Records simply lost in filing
4. Records misplaced between ownership transitions
5. Documents borrowed but not returned

There is probably some kernel of truth to all of them. But the fact remains; there is no original, single, totally accurate database of serial numbers from 1866 forward that we are aware of. But perhaps these pages can help you somewhat in your research.

Other manufacturers maintain similar databases.

In the United States, the Gun Control Act of 1968 was prompted by the assassination of U.S. President John F. Kennedy in 1963. Congressional hearings followed and a ban on mail-order gun sales was discussed, but no law was passed until 1968. Precursors of the passage of the Gun Control Act were Senate Bill 1975 in 1963, "A Bill to Regulate the Interstate Shipment of Firearms," and Senate Bill 1592 in 1965, "A Bill to Amend the Federal Firearms Act of 1938." Both were introduced by Senator Thomas J. Dodd and met with fierce opposition on the floor but the bills also paved the way for the creation of the Gun Control Act of 1968.

The basic point of such legislation is that the weapon will plainly have a unique identifier. Thus, for example, an importer is expressly forbidden from recycling numbers. "Factory-produced firearms bear serial numbers." So factory producers and federally licensed gun dealers are required by U.S. law to maintain records for their inventory of serial numbers of all firearms and to report both the guns' serial numbers and the purchasers' names.

In most jurisdictions, an application for firearm registration requires a recitation of a particular weapon's serial number. Sales of firearms that are required to be reported have a similar requirement. (Note: See for example New Jersey v. Harris 2012 Supreme Court of New Jersey via justia.com "A firearm's serial number is visible simply by looking at the weapon. ... State law requires every handgun sale to be recorded with details including the serial number.")

Homemade firearms in the United States are not legally required to have a serial number. However, they have useful value. "[A]lthough markings are not required on firearms manufactured for personal use (excluding NFA firearms) (Note: The following weapons are regulated under the National Firearms Act (NFA): 1. A shotgun having a barrel or barrels of less than 18 inches in length; 2. A weapon made from a shotgun if such weapon as modified has an overall length of less than 26 inches or a barrel or barrels of less than 18 inches in length; 3. A rifle having a barrel or barrels of less than 16 inches in length; 4. A weapon made from a rifle if such weapon as modified has an overall length of less than 26 inches or a barrel or barrels of less than 16 inches in length; 5. Any other weapon, as defined in subsection (e); 6. A machinegun; 7. Any silencer (as defined in section 921 of title 18, United States Code); and; 8. A destructive device.[26 U.S.C. 5845; 27 CFR 479.11]) owners are recommended to conspicuously place or engrave a serial number and/ or other marks of identification to aid in investigation or recovery by State or local law enforcement officials in the event of a theft or loss of the privately owned firearm."

== Methods of marking ==
Techniques for marking the serial number and other identifying details on the gun include:

- dot matrix peening
- engraving using a machine tool
- laser engraving
- roller marking
- stamping or pressing

== Dimensions and details ==
In the US, manufacturers and importers are required to place identifiers on firearms. The dimensions of the serial number and other identifying details were codified in 2002 in section 27, part 478.92 of the Code of Federal Regulations:

... legibly identify each firearm manufactured or imported as follows:

i. By engraving, casting, stamping (impressing), or otherwise conspicuously placing or causing to be engraved, cast, stamped (impressed) or placed on the frame or receiver thereof an individual serial number. The serial number must be placed in a manner not susceptible of being readily obliterated, altered, or removed, and must not duplicate any serial number placed by you on any other firearm. For firearms manufactured or imported on and after January 30, 2002, the engraving, casting, or stamping (impressing) of the serial number must be to a minimum depth of .003 inch and in a print size no smaller than 1/16 inch; and

ii. By engraving, casting, stamping (impressing), or otherwise conspicuously placing or causing to be engraved, cast, stamped (impressed) or placed on the frame, receiver, or barrel thereof certain additional information. This information must be placed in a manner not susceptible of being readily obliterated, altered, or removed. For firearms manufactured or imported on and after January 30, 2002, the engraving, casting, or stamping (impressing) of this information must be to a minimum depth of .003 inch. The additional information includes:

A. The model, if such designation has been made;

B. The caliber or gauge;

C. Your name (or recognized abbreviation) and also, when applicable, the name of the foreign manufacturer;

D. In the case of a domestically made firearm, the city and State (or recognized abbreviation thereof) where you as the manufacturer maintain your place of business; and

E. In the case of an imported firearm, the name of the country in which it was manufactured and the city and State (or recognized abbreviation thereof) where you as the importer maintain your place of business. For additional requirements relating to imported firearms, see Customs regulations at 19 CFR part 134.

== See also ==
- Automated firearms identification
- Brady Handgun Violence Prevention Act
- Forensic firearm examination
- Federal Assault Weapons Ban
- Gun law in the United States
- Gun politics in the United States
- Microstamping
- Right to keep and bear arms
