= Chamber (firearms) =

Cavity where a cartridge is inserted before being fired

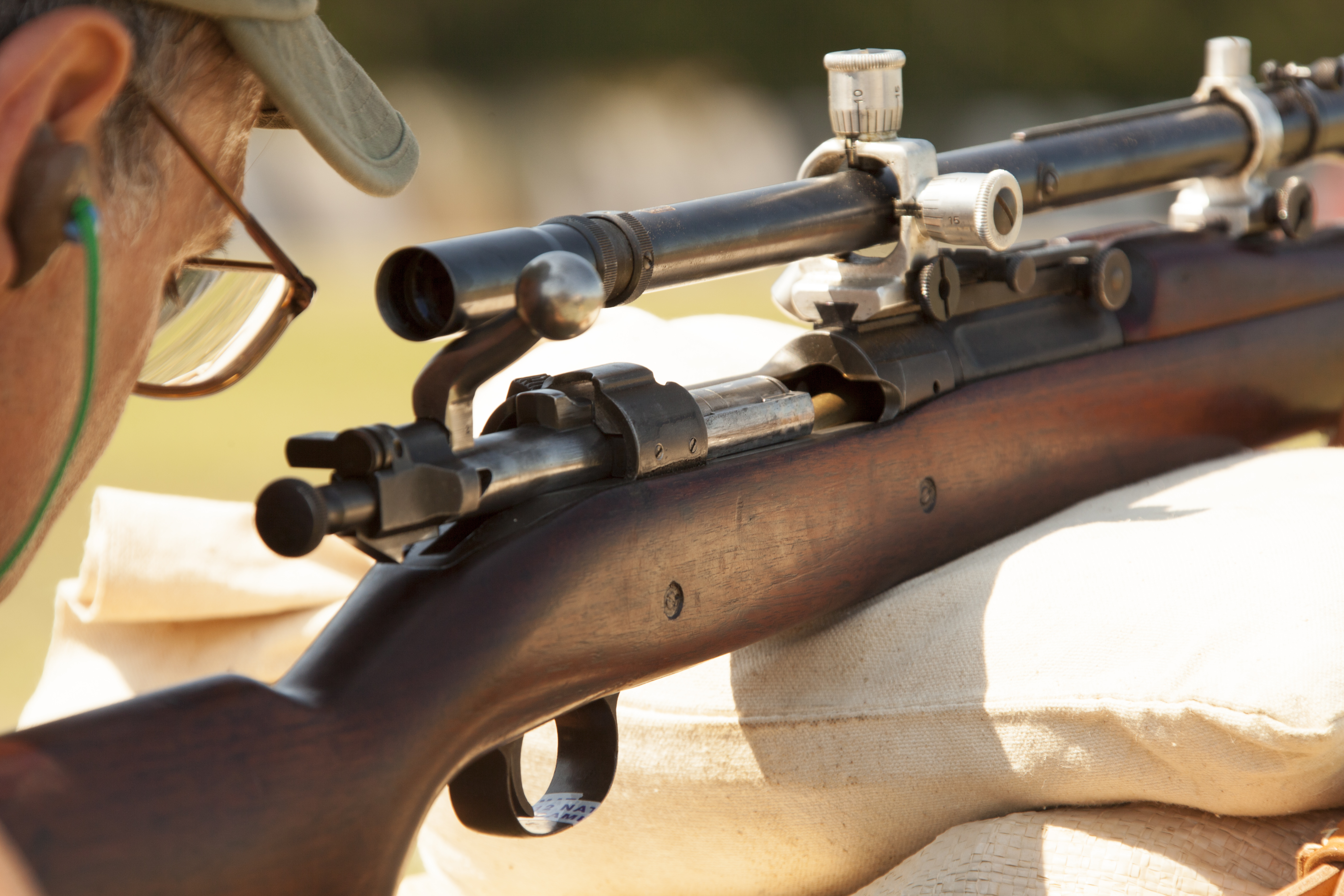
A cartridge being pushed into the chamber of a Springfield M1903

The chamber of a firearm is the cavity at the back end of a breechloading weapon's barrel or cylinder, where the ammunition is inserted before being fired. The rear opening of the chamber is the breech, and is sealed by the breechblock or the bolt.

== Function ==
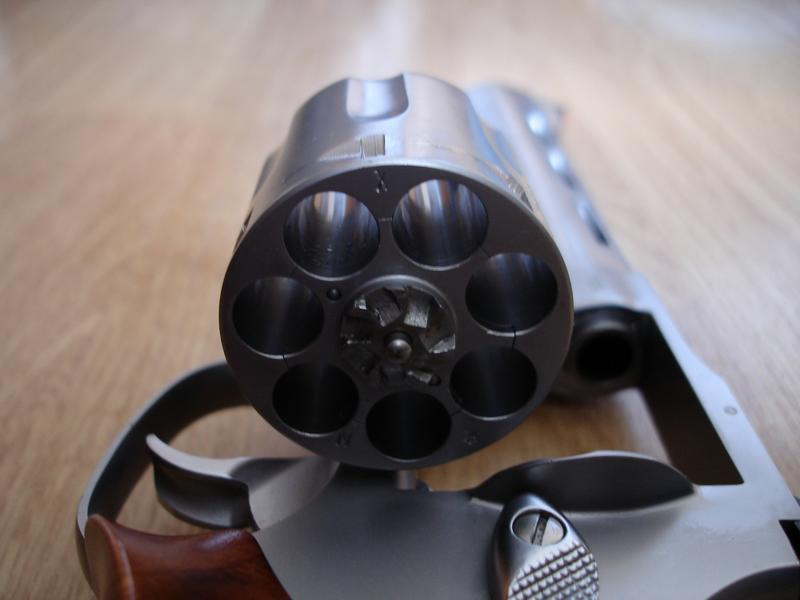
Chambers of a revolver's cylinder

The act of chambering a cartridge means the insertion of a round into the chamber, either manually or through the action of the weapon, e.g., pump-action, lever-action, bolt action, or autoloading operation generally in anticipation of firing the weapon, without need to "load" the weapon upon decision to use it (reducing the number of actions needed to discharge).

Automatic and single-shot pistols (such as Derringers), rifles, and shotguns generally have a single chamber integral to their barrels, but revolvers have multiple chambers in their cylinder, and no chamber in their barrel. Thus, pistols, rifles, and shotguns can usually still be fired with the magazine removed as long as a cartridge is inserted into the chamber, while a revolver cannot be fired at all with its cylinder swung out or broken open excepting a hang fire or other malfunction.

In firearms design or modification, "chambering" is fitting a weapon's chamber for a particular caliber or round, so a Colt Model 1911 is chambered for .45 ACP or .38 Super, or re-chambered for .38/.45 Clerke. While the majority of firearms are chambered for one caliber, some are chambered for multiple calibers; however firing an oversized or undersized cartridge can be hazardous.

== Fluted chamber ==
Fluted and non-fluted chamber in a blowback firearm

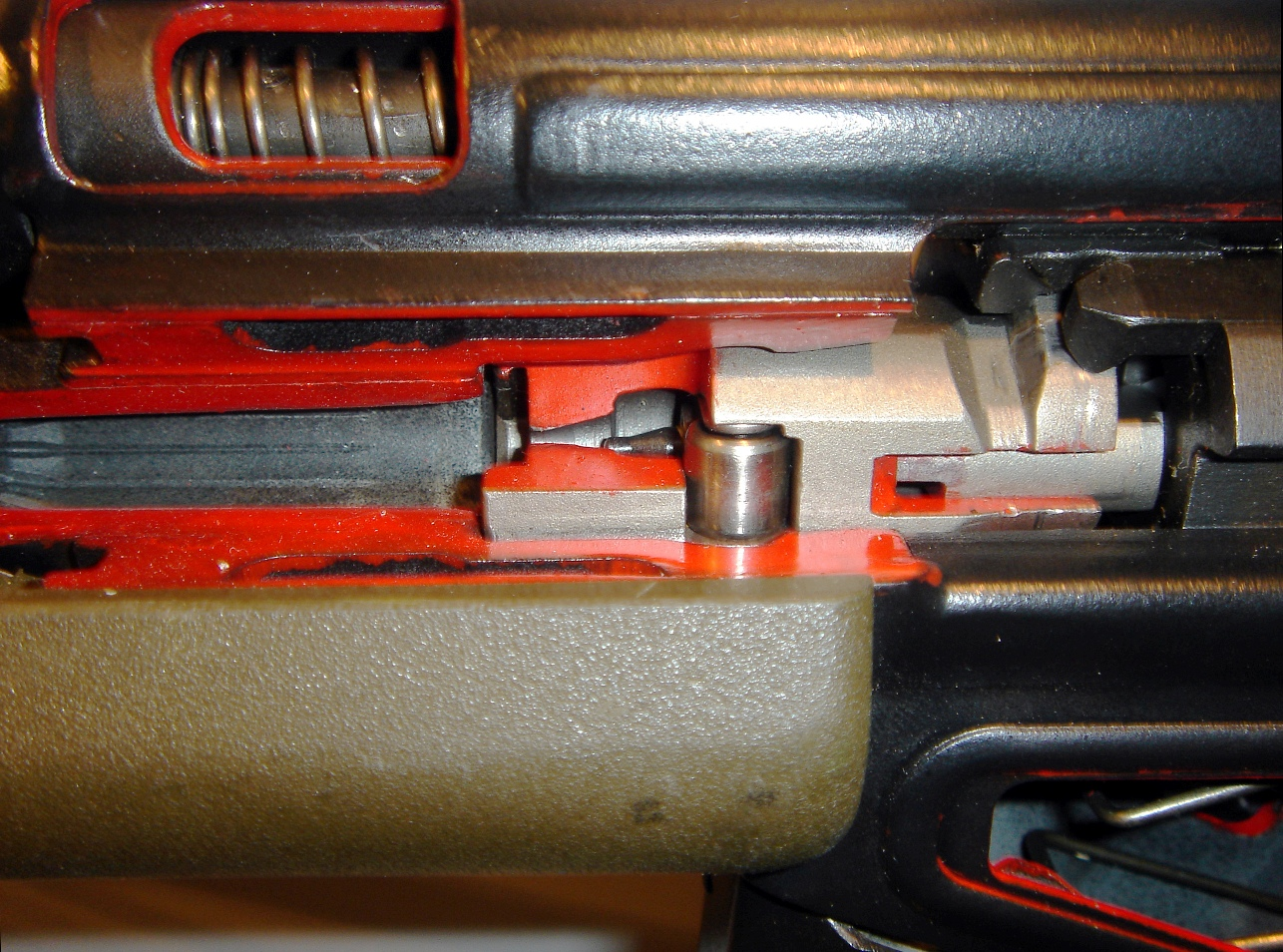
Cutaway model of the chamber with gas relief flutes (left) and roller-delayed action of the G3 battle rifle

In the barrel chamber, fluting refers to gas relief flutes/grooves used to ease the extraction of cartridges. They may also come in annular and helical forms. Notable firearms using fluted chambers are the roller-delayed blowback Heckler & Koch G3 and lever-delayed blowback FAMAS and AA-52.

Roller or lever-delayed blowback arms require that the bolt starts moving while the bullet is still in the barrel and the spent case is fully pressurized. Fluting the end of the chamber allows combustion gasses to float the neck and front of the cartridge case providing pressure equalization between the front outer surface of the cartridge case and its interior. The roller-delayed blowback StG 45(M) assault rifle prototypes proved pressure equalization fluting is desirable, since the breech of roller or lever-delayed blowback arms is opened whilst under very high internal cartridge case pressure that presses a spent (bloated) cartridge casing against the chamber walls which can cause significant problems during the cartridge extraction phase. Using traditionally cut (non-fluted) chambers in the StG 45(M) resulted in separated cartridge case heads during testing.

=== Ported chamber ===
A barrel chamber with pressure relief ports that allows gas to leak around the cartridge during extraction. Basically, the opposite of a fluted chamber, as it is intended for the cartridge to stick to the chamber wall making a slight delay of extraction. This requires a welded-on sleeve with an annular groove to contain the pressure.

=== Stepped chamber ===
A stepped chamber is an expansion ring near the case shoulder. This feature is used to delay the extraction process further, resulting in a very smooth and soft cycling operation. In some other firearms, like the Seecamp and the Walther PDP, the stepped chamber is designed to center the projectile as it enters the rifling, which enhances accuracy.

== Multi chamber ==
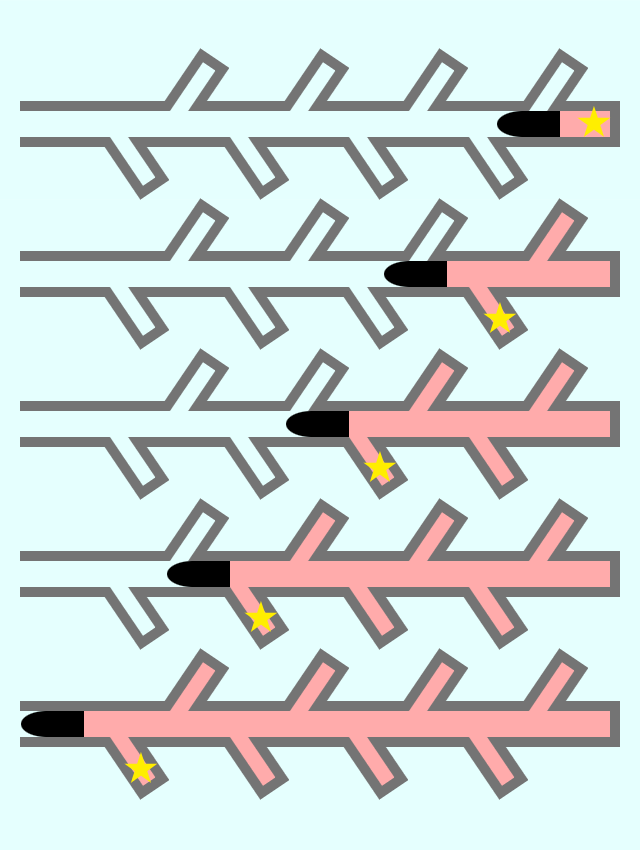
Schematic of a multi-chamber gun

Mostly used on artillery guns. Multi chambered is where the barrel has a series of chambers to propel the round down the barrel to increase speed and range. The Lymann-Haskell multi chamber gun is an example.

== Reversed chamber ==
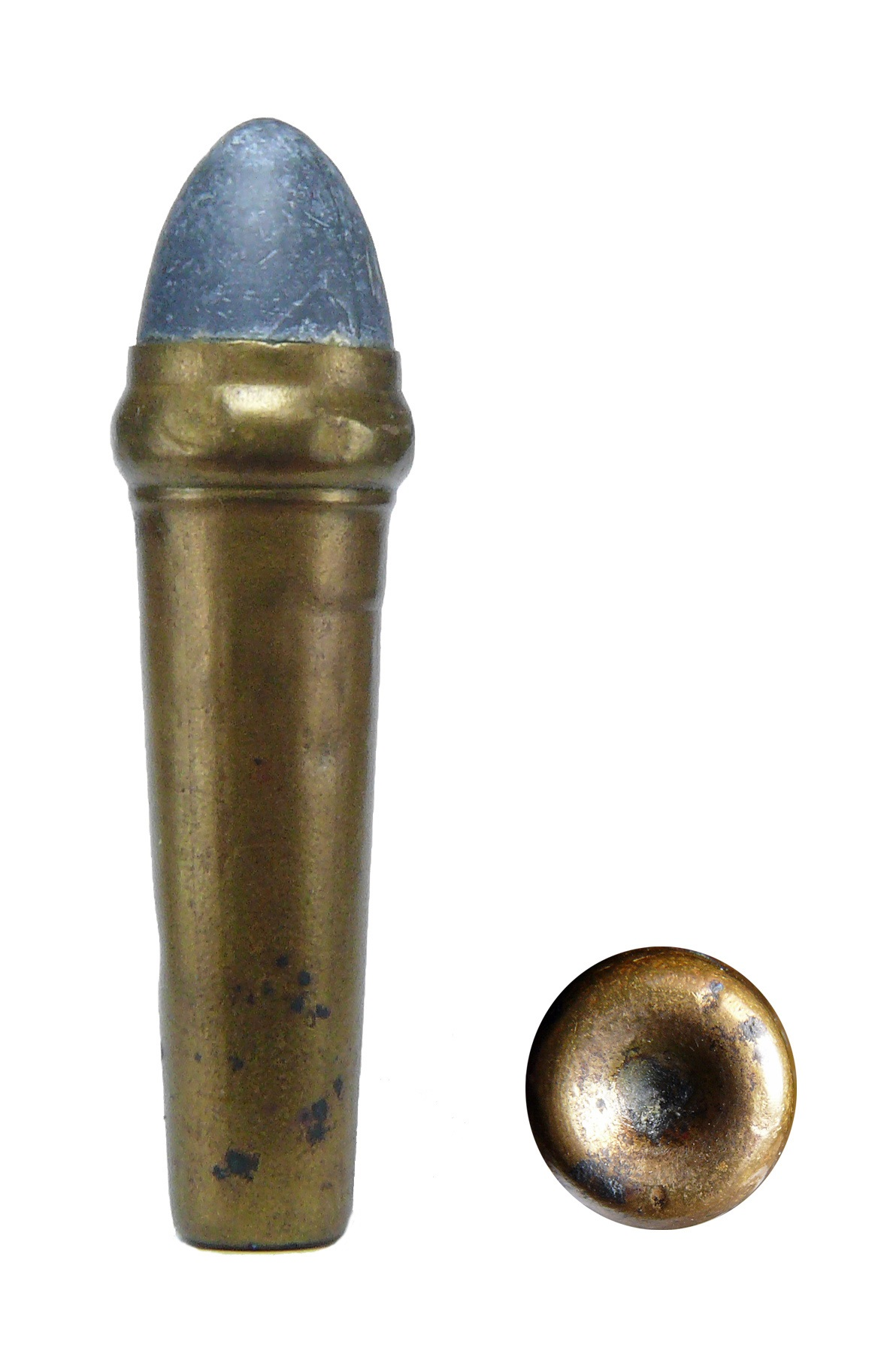
Reverse chambered .54 Burnside cartridge

An unusual reverse chamber has been used on firearms such as the Burnside carbine, Rikhter R-23 and T168 autocannons.

== Forensics ==
The chamber is a key component to the practice of forensic firearm examination. The chamber is known to imprint its surface striations irregularities on the cartridge case, in what are called chamber marks, due to the pressure produced when shooting. Such imperfections in chamber may be produced in the manufacturing process or through extensive use. Such chamber marks are more pronounced on substandard firearms or when firing from an undersized chamber.

In recent years there has been a push to automate this process via the use of automated firearms databases. Ballistics identification has also seen the development of microstamping technology which purposefully creates chamber marks through engravings on the firing pin and breech face.

== See also ==
- Glossary of firearms terms
