= Automated firearms identification =

Automated Firearms Identification refers to the use of computers to automate the process of matching a piece of recovered ballistic evidence (which can be either bullets or cartridge cases, or fragments thereof), against a database.

== Automated ballistic identification systems ==
Every firearm leaves unique, reproducible markings on expended (used) bullet and cartridge cases that it fired. The barrel, firing pin, firing chamber, extractor, ejector and other parts of the gun leave these marks, called toolmarks, on the bullet and cartridge case faces. Individually and collectively, these markings function as the “ballistic signature” of the firearm.

Traditional firearms identification involves the use of a Comparison Microscope. A firearms examiner visually compares the ballistic signature of a bullet/cartridge recovered from a crime scene with those in the police files. This process and its outcome, while accurate and acceptable in court, is extremely time consuming. Because of this, its usefulness as an investigative tool is severely limited.

Automated Ballistic Identification Systems (ABIS) are specialized computer hardware/software combinations designed to capture, store and rapidly compare digital images of bullets and cartridge casings.

ABIS have four key components:

1. The Ballistic Scanner, which captures the images of the bullets and cartridges
2. The Signature Extraction Unit, which uses a mathematical algorithm to extract unique signatures from the images
3. Data Storage Unit, which serves as the main storage,
4. The Correlation Server, which handles the actual comparison of images.

== United States ==
Automated Firearms Identification has its roots in the United States, the country with the highest per capita firearms ownership. In 1993, the Federal Bureau of Investigation commissioned Mnemonics Systems Inc. to develop Drugfire, which enabled law enforcement agencies to capture images of cartridge casings into computers, and automate the process of comparing a suspect cartridge against the database. Drugfire was later upgraded to handle bullet imaging as well.

Also in 1993, the Bureau of Alcohol, Tobacco and Firearms established its own automated ballistics identification system. Instead of having a custom-made system like the FBI however, ATF opted to build their network on a platform developed by Forensic Technology WAI Inc., a private Canadian company. At the time, the FTI platform was named Bulletproof, and imaged only bullets. It was later upgraded to handle cartridge casings as well, and was then subsequently renamed as the Integrated Ballistics Identification System (IBIS).

From 1993 to 1998, the United States had two automated ballistics identification systems in place: Drugfire, which was under the FBI, and IBIS, under the ATF. Although there were attempts to interconnect the two systems under the National Integrated Ballistic Identification Network (NIBIN), the FBI and ATF finally decided in 1999 to phase out Drugfire, and standardize NIBIN on the IBIS platform. This decision was arrived at after a thorough joint FBI-ATF evaluation revealed the superiority of IBIS over the other system.

The adoption of IBIS as the NIBIN standard propelled Forensic Technology as the world’s biggest manufacturer of automated ballistic identification systems. As of 2016, there are more than 700 IBIS systems installed in more than 60 countries worldwide.

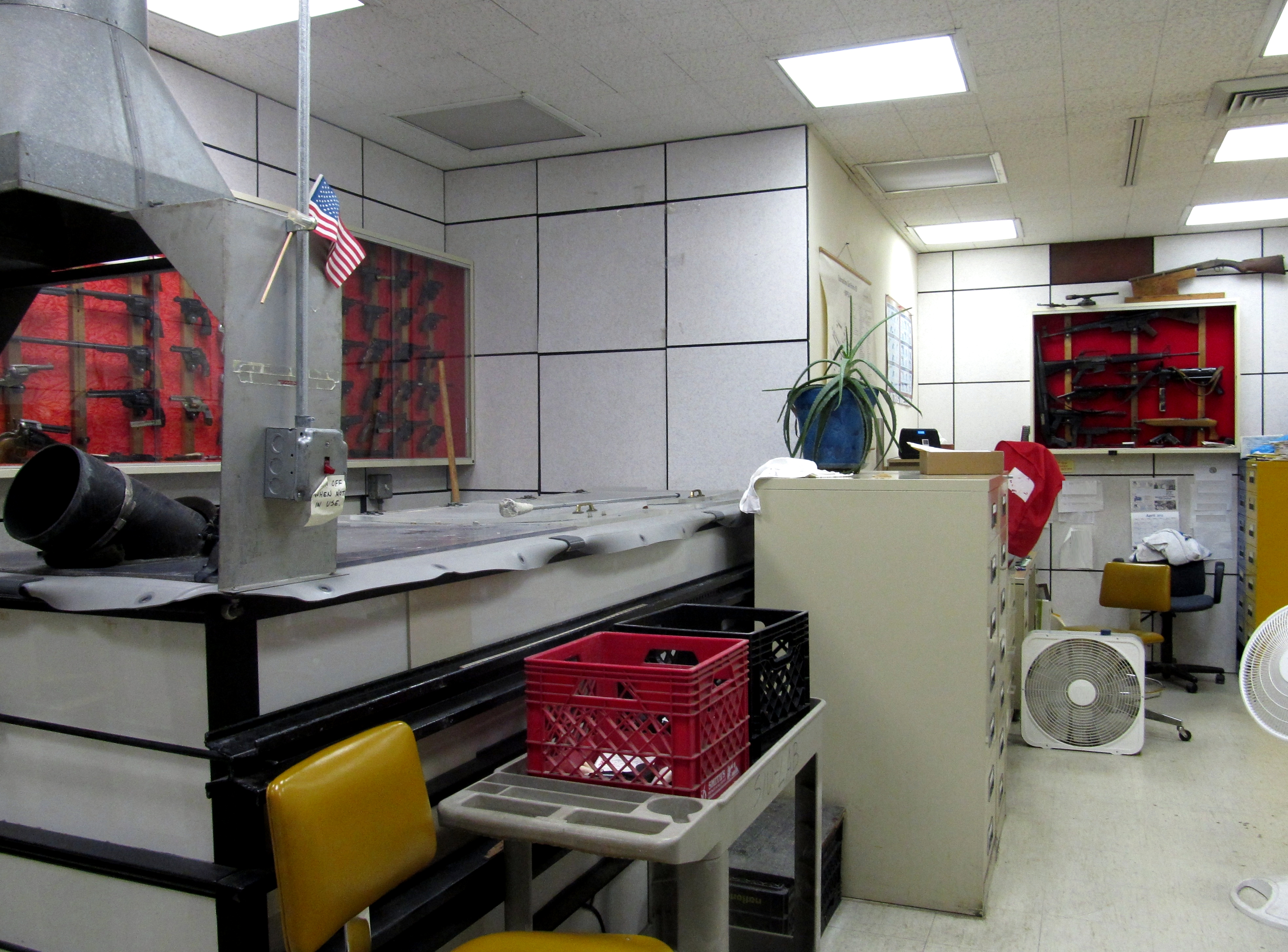
A firearm identification room. This room includes microscopes, a water tank for firing bullets and, an ABIS system. This room is used to identify and test firearms picked up as evidence.

== Other systems ==
There are other ballistic identification systems in the market, such as TopMatch-3D by Cadre Forensics (Chicago, IL), ALIAS by Pyramidal Technologies Ltd, Russia's ARSENAL by Papillon Systems, POISC by SBC Co. Ltd, BalScan by Laboratory Imaging and EVOFINDER by SCANBII Technology. The only ones that took a serious percentage of the market are TopMatch and EVOFINDER. Since 2006, installations of 3D systems have increased. Some of the countries and services which have adopted 3D technology are Switzerland/Zurich, Germany/B.K.A, Brazil/POLICIA CIVIL, Germany/ LKA Magdeburg, Germany/ LKA Munich, Switzerland / KAPO, Malaysia, Mexico, Canada / RCMP, Brazil/Goyania, Colombia, Belgium, Slovenia, Brazil/ Federal Police, Germany/LKA Düsseldorf, Finland, Greece, Kazakhstan, Germany/LKA Brandenburg, Nicaragua, France / I.R.C.G.N, and others.

The lack of a significant installed base may prove to be a substantial issue in the future of these systems. Specifically, this may have an adverse impact on the capability of the developers to refine their systems' correlation algorithms and networking capabilities.

The correlation algorithm is what enables an Automated Ballistic Identification System to distinguish one bullet/cartridge case from another. Computer simulations alone cannot be relied on in developing a reliable algorithm. At some point, this algorithm must be "field-tested" against a real-life database. The bigger the database against which the developers can test, the more reliable the algorithm. To put it simply, the only way to determine if a correlation algorithm will be able to find a match of a specimen against a database of 1,000,000 entries is to do an actual test against a database of 1,000,000 entries.

In December 2013, The Geneva Academy of International Humanitarian Law and Human Rights launched an International Weapons Law Database, including a search engine per weapons, treaty as well as a glossary.

== Today ==
Automated firearms identification is now a universally accepted technology. As the system with the largest installed base, IBIS has become the de facto world standard.

The emergence of a world standard enables law enforcement agencies worldwide to share ballistic data. This capability is now being leveraged as a tool for international collaboration among law enforcement agencies worldwide. Countries have begun to link up their IBIS systems. Europe already has EURO-IBIS, while the United States recently concluded an agreement to link their NIBIN system with Canada's.

INTERPOL

In early 2009, INTERPOL signed an agreement with Forensic Technology, wherein the latter will install and maintain an IBIS correlation server at INTERPOL headquarters in Lyon, France. To facilitate ballistic information sharing among INTERPOL member-countries in Asia, a second IBIS Correlation Server was installed at the INTERPOL Centre for Global Innovation in Singapore in 2015. Countries participating in this program can on voluntary basis share their ballistic data.

Asia is also rapidly catching up with the West. Thailand, Hong Kong, Taiwan, India and the Philippines have already deployed IBIS systems.

== Impact on firearms examiners ==
ABIS do not take over the function of the Firearms Examiner. They were never designed nor intended to do this.

Law enforcement agencies worldwide utilize ABIS to rapidly generate Candidate Lists of probable matches of a suspect bullet/cartridge against the ballistic database. Depending on the agency’s requirements, ABIS will generate the Top 10, Top 20, etc. list of probable matches. The Firearms Examiners then use these candidate lists to select the actual bullets/cartridges they will visually compare with the suspect bullet/cartridge.

In all installations of ABIS worldwide, it is the Firearms Examiners who make the final decision and certification of a ballistic match. Likewise, it is the Firearms Examiners who testify in court.
