= Forensic firearm examination =

Analysis of firearms and bullets for presentation as legal evidence

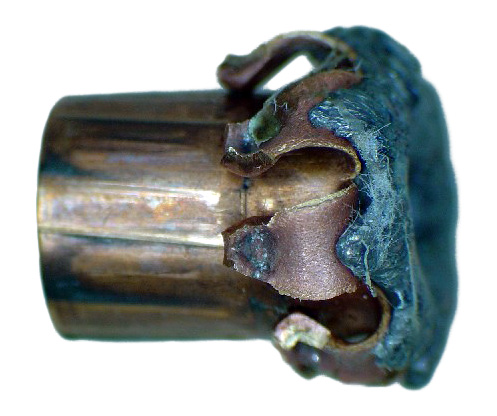
A fired .38 Special hollow-point bullet viewed from the side, showing the intended terminal ballistics sometimes referred to as mushrooming

Forensic firearm examination is the forensic process of examining the characteristics of firearms or bullets left behind at a crime scene. Specialists in this field try to link bullets to weapons and weapons to individuals. They can raise and record obliterated serial numbers in an attempt to find the registered owner of a weapon and look for fingerprints on a weapon and cartridges.

By examining unique striations impressed into a bullet from the barrel of a gun, expended ammunition can be linked back to a specific weapon. These striations are due to the rifling inside the barrels of firearms. Rifling spins the bullet when it is fired out of the barrel to improve precision. Although bullet striations are individualized unique evidence, microscopic striations in the barrel of the weapon are subject to change slightly, after each round that is fired. For this reason, forensic ballistics examiners may not fire more than five shots from a weapon found at a scene. Known exemplars taken from a seized weapon can be compared to samples recovered from a scene using a comparison microscope as well as newer 3-D imaging technology. Striation images can also be uploaded to national databases. Furthermore, the markings can be compared to other images in an attempt to link one weapon to multiple crime scenes.

Like all forensic specialties, forensic's firearm examiners are subject to being called to testify in court as expert witnesses. However, the reliability of some techniques of forensic firearm examination have been criticized.

== History ==
The ability to compare ammunition is a direct result of the invention of rifling around the turn of the 16th century. By forcing the bullet to spin as it travels down the barrel of the weapon the precision is greatly increased. At the same time, examination occurred in 1835 when a member of the Bow Street Runners in London matched a recovered bullet from a murder victim to a specific mold in a suspect's home confirming that he made the bullet; this gave further evidence that the bullet maker was the perpetrator and he was convicted. As manufacturing and automation replaced hand tools, the ability to compare bullets became impossible due to the standardization of molds within a specific company. However, experts in the field postulated that there were microscopic differences on each barrel left during the manufacturing process. These differences were a result of wear on the machines and since each new weapon caused a tiny amount of wear, each barrel would be slightly different from every other barrel produced by that company. Also, each bullet fired from a specific barrel would be printed with the same marks, allowing investigators to identify the weapon that fired a specific bullet.

One of the first uses of this knowledge was in 1915 to exonerate Charles Stielow of the murder of his neighbors. Stielow was sentenced to death and appealed to Charles S. Whitman, the Governor of New York, who was not convinced by the evidence used to convict Stielow. Whitman halted the execution until an inquiry could be conducted and after further examination it was shown that Stielow's firearm could not have fired the bullets recovered from the victims. The invention of the comparison microscope by Calvin Goddard and Phillip O. Gravelle in 1925 modernized the forensic examination of firearms. Simultaneous comparison of two different objects at the same time allowed to closely examine striations for matches and therefore make a more definitive statement as to whether or not they matched.

One of the first true tests of this new technology was in the aftermath of the Saint Valentine's Day Massacre in 1929. During the Prohibition Era, competing gang members were fighting over bootlegging operations within the city of Chicago. Members of the Chicago Outfit and the Egan's Rats led by Al Capone attempted to remove all competition from Chicago by eliminating the North Side Gang leader Bugs Moran. The massacre missed Moran, who was not present, but killed seven members of the North Side Gang. The murderers attempted to cover up their crime by posing as police officers, even dressing in police uniforms. Witnesses saw two "officers" leaving the scene, which implicated the Chicago police department as the perpetrators of the massacre. High levels of police corruption during that time period made it seem likely that the police department committed the killings. The investigation stalled until December 1929 when Fred Burke, a member of the Egan's Rats, shot and killed a police officer in St. Joseph, Michigan. Officers searching for Burke were led to a home in nearby Stevensville. While Burke was not there, inside officers found an arsenal of weapons including two Thompson submachine guns. The Chicago police department was contacted and the weapons were brought back to Chicago for testing. Goddard was asked to compare the weapons to collected evidence found at the massacre using his new "ballistic-forensics" technique. After test firing the guns, Goddard proved that the weapons were those used to kill the members of the North Side Gang, absolving the Chicago police department of all involvement. The successful use of Goddard's technique resulted in the solidification of his place as the father of forensic firearm examination.

== Examination of the firearm ==
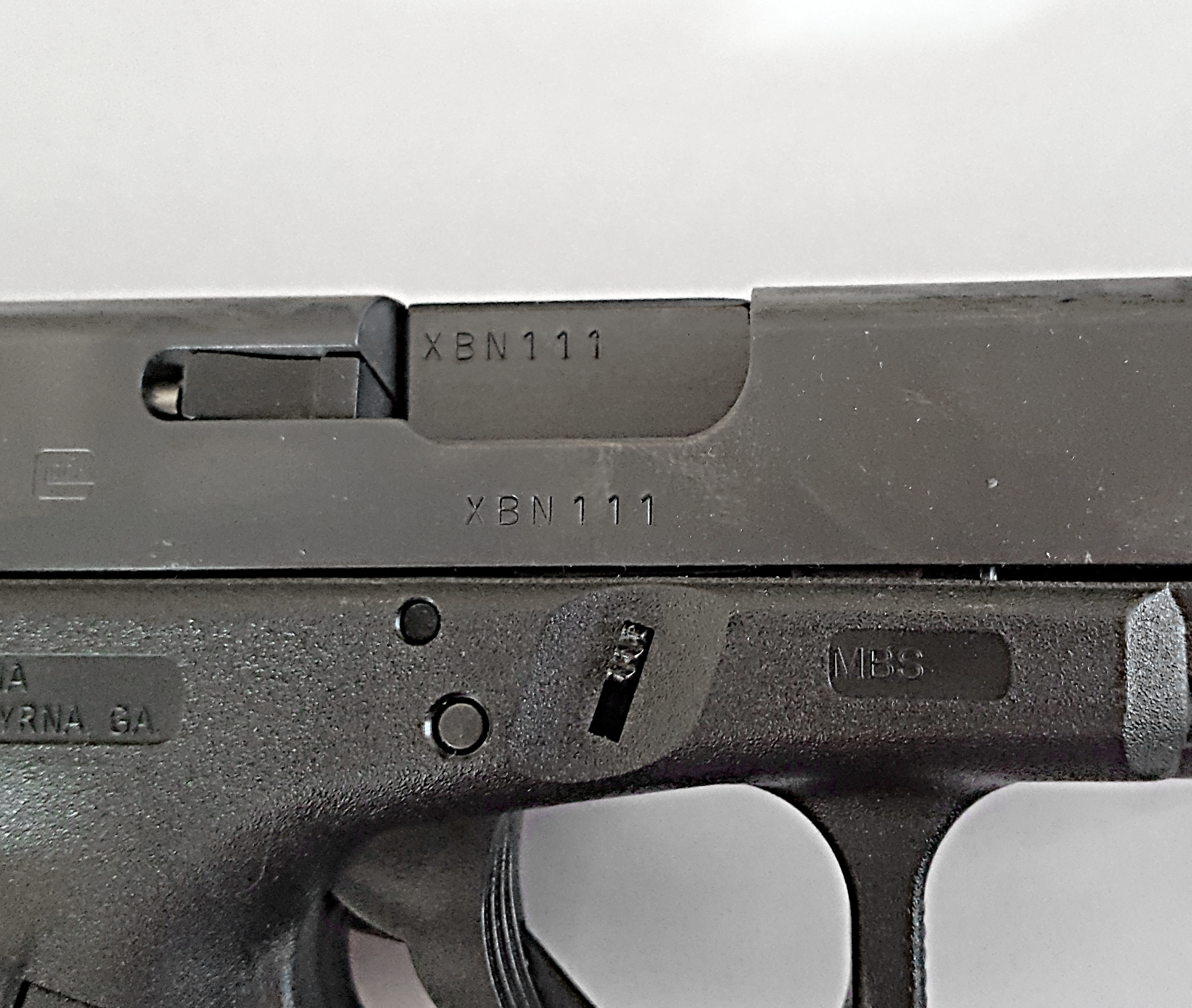
Multiple serial numbers provide redundancy and make it difficult to fully remove the numbers from a weapon.

Any firearm collected during the course of an investigation could yield viable evidence if examined. For forensic firearm examination specific evidence that can be recovered include weapon serial numbers and potentially fingerprints left on the weapon's surface.

=== Fingerprint recovery ===
Fingerprint recovery from the surface of firearms is done with cyanoacrylate (more commonly known as superglue) fuming. Firearms are placed in a specially designed fume hood designed to evenly distribute fumes instead of removing them. Liquid superglue is placed in a container and heated until it is in a gaseous state. The circulating fumes adhere to the oils left behind by the fingerprint, turning the print white. The resulting white print can be enhanced with fingerprint powder to increase the contrast of the white print against the weapon's finish. While using the fuming technique on recovered guns is commonplace, the recovery of fingerprints from the surfaces of a firearm is challenging due to the textured grip and the general condition of recovered weapons. If fingerprints are recovered, they can be processed through fingerprint databases such as the Integrated Automated Fingerprint Identification System (IAFIS). Various parts of the recovered weapon can also be tested for touch DNA left by whoever handled it. However, the low levels of DNA that can be recovered presents numerous issues such as contamination and analysis anomalies such as allele drop-out and drop-in.

=== Serial number recovery ===
Serial number examinations are a form of tool mark analysis. Serial numbers became commonplace after the United States passed the Gun Control Act of 1968. This law mandated that all guns manufactured in or imported into the country have a serial number. Prior to 1968, many firearms either did not have a serial number or the serial numbers were not unique and were reused by a manufacturer on multiple firearms. If a recovered weapon has had the serial numbers altered or destroyed, examiners can attempt to recover the original numbers. The two main methods for the restoration of serial numbers are magnetic particle inspection and chemical restoration. It is recommended that magnetic particle inspection be performed first due to the nondestructive nature of the method. If magnetic particle inspection fails, chemical restoration is the next step in the forensic analysis.

If the serial number is successfully restored it can be used to help investigators track the weapon's history, as well as potentially determine who owns the weapon. Firearm databases such as the National Crime Information Center of the United States and INTERPOL's Firearm Reference Table can be used by investigators to track weapons that have been lost, stolen, or used previously in other crimes.

==== Magnetic particle inspection ====
Originally developed as a method to detect flaws or irregularities in magnetic materials, magnetic particle inspection can be used on firearms to visualize the serial number underneath the obliterated area. When performing this technique, examiners place the weapon in a magnetic field. The irregularities in the metal, in this case the serial number, cause the field to deform. When a solution of ferrous particles is added to the weapon's magnetized surface they will be attracted to the area where the magnetic field has deformed and will build up in the area. If fluorescent particles are added to the ferrous solution, ultraviolet light can be used to make it easier to visualize any recovered serial number.

==== Chemical restoration ====
Chemical restoration is a type of chemical milling. Typically, chemical milling is used to slowly remove material to create a desired shape. In serial number restoration, small amounts of metal are removed until variations in the metal corresponding to the serial number are visible. This is possible because stamping the numbers distorts the grain boundary structure underneath the surface of the metal. However, chemical restoration is limited to that depth and is only successful when the obliteration of the serial number is superficial. Examiners performing a restoration first sand the area where the serial number used to be. This removes any debris from the area left when the serial number was obliterated. The examiner then chooses a chemical, usually an acid, that will be used to slowly bring the number back to the surface. The type of chemical that is used depends on the material the weapon is made of. These acids can range from Fry's Reagent for a magnetic metal, which is a mixture of hydrochloric acid, cupric chloride, and distilled water, to an acidic ferric chloride solution for a non-magnetic, non-aluminum material.

== Examination of cartridges ==
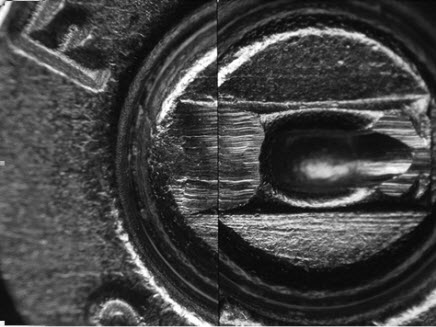
Two test-fired cartridges under magnification. Matching striations can be seen.

Spent cartridges found at a scene can be examined for physical evidence such as fingerprints or compared to samples that match them to a weapon. The examination of the cartridge relies on the unique tool marks left by the various parts of the weapon including the firing pin and the ejector in semi and fully automatic firearms. These markings can be compared and matched to known exemplars fired from the same weapon using the same parts. The examination of the marks left on the cartridge is done using a comparison microscope. Examiners view the questioned cartridge and the known exemplar simultaneously, looking for similar microscopic marks left during the firing process.

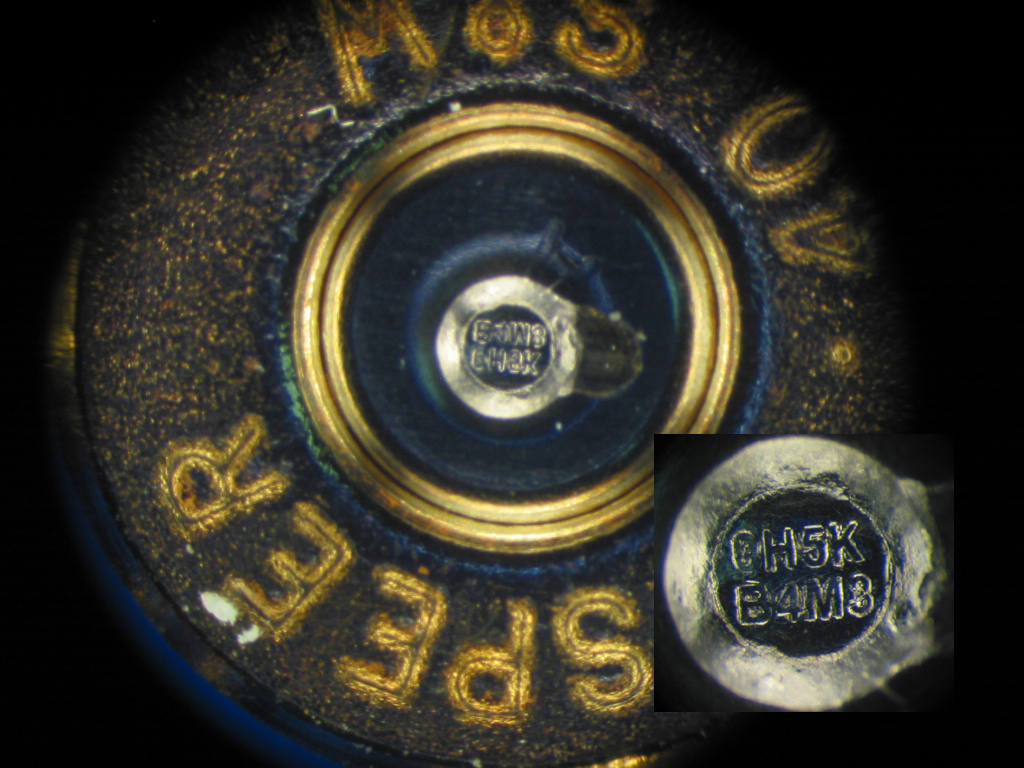
Example of microstamping. Insert shows a close up of the serial number imprinted into the cartridge.

Cartridges are also routinely examined for fingerprints as the act of loading the ammunition into the magazine, or chamber, leaves recoverable impressions. These fingerprints can survive the firing processes and, while a rare occurrence, fingerprints have been obtained from cartridges recovered from the scene. Cartridges are subjected to cyanoacrylate fuming and examined for any usable prints. Usable prints are photographed and can be uploaded to fingerprint databases such as IAFIS for comparison with known exemplars. Cartridges can also be swabbed for trace DNA left by the individual who loaded the magazine. The extremely low levels of recoverable DNA present the same issues as swabbing a firearm for DNA.

Advancements in microscopic stamping have led to a push for the inclusion of firing pin microstamping. The microstamp is etched onto the firing pin and is transferred to the cartridge during the firing process. Each firing pin would have a unique serial number allowing investigators to trace casings found at a crime scene to a known firearm. The practice is not in use as of 2026, although California has enacted legislation that requires microstamping on all newly sold firearms. The law, and microstamping in general, has received significant opposition from gun manufacturers due the technology being unreliable, and not proven to aid in preventing or solving crimes.

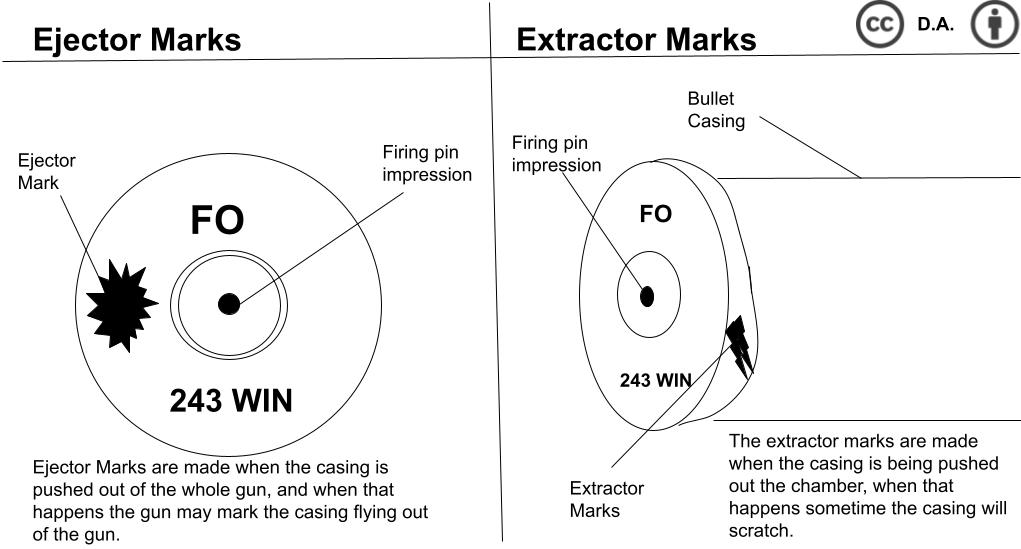
This is an example and explanation of Extractor/Ejector Marks on casings.

This cartridge casing impression image shows the markings of circular line, centerfire, extractor, ejector and, what headstamping shows on a spent cartridge.

== Examination of bullets ==
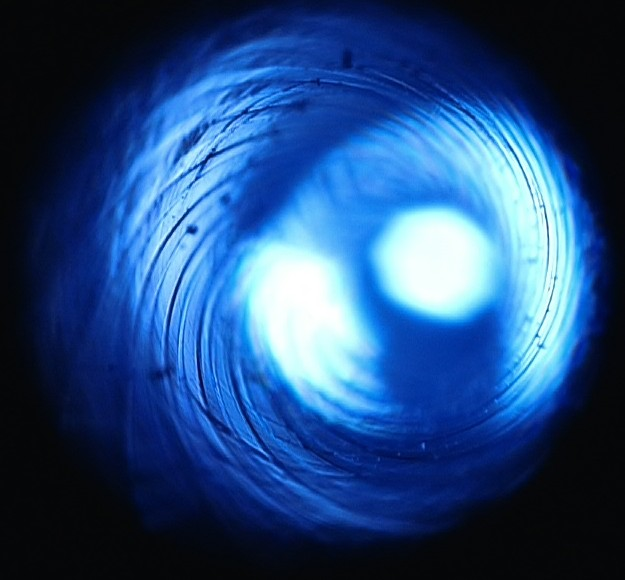
Rifling pattern for a Remington rifle showing a clockwise (right-handed) twist.

=== Class characteristics ===
Preliminary examination of the bullet can exclude a large number of weapons by examining the general characteristics of a recovered bullet. By determining general aspects of the fired ammunition, a number of weapons can be immediately excluded as being incapable of firing that type of bullet. The make and model of the weapon can also be inferred from the combination of different class characteristics that are common to specific manufactures. The three main class characteristics of all bullets are the lands and grooves, the caliber of the bullet, and the rifling twist. All three can be tied directly to the type of barrel that was used to fire the bullet. The lands and grooves of barrel are the bumps and valleys created when the rifling is created. The caliber is the diameter of the barrel. The twist is the direction of the striations left by the barrel's rifling, clockwise (right-handed) or counterclockwise (left-handed). Most barrels will have a right-handed twist with the exception of weapons created by the Colt's Manufacturing Company which uses left-handed twists. Weapon barrels that match the class characteristics of recovered bullets can be examined further for individual characteristics to determine if the bullet came from that particular weapon.

=== Individual characteristics ===
In order to compare individual striations, examiners must obtain a known sample using the seized weapon. For slower-traveling bullets, such as pistols or revolvers, known bullet exemplars are created by firing the weapon into a water tank. The spent bullet can be recovered, intact, as the water slows down the bullet before it can reach the tank walls. For faster traveling bullets, such as those fired from high-powered rifles and military style weapons, water tanks cannot be used as the tank will not provide enough stopping power for the projectiles. To examine these weapons, investigators must fire them at a target at a controlled range with enough backing to stop the bullet and collect the spent round after it has been fired.

Once a known exemplar is produced, the evidence sample can be compared to the known by examining both at the same time with a comparison microscope. Striations that line up are examined more closely, looking for multiple consecutive matches. There is no set number of consecutive matches that equates to a match declaration, and examiners are trained to use the phrase "sufficient agreement" when testifying. The degree to which an examiner can make that determination is based on their training and expertise. All findings by examiners are subject to questioning by both sides, prosecution and defense, during testimony in court.

== Striation databasing ==
Bullets and casings found at a scene require a known example to compare to in order to match them to a weapon. Without a weapon, the striation pattern can be uploaded to a database such as the National Integrated Ballistic Identification Network (NIBIN) maintained by the ATF or the United Kingdom's National Ballistics Intelligence Service (NABIS). Information uploaded to these databases can be used to track gun crimes and to link crimes together. Maintainers of these databases recommend that every recovered firearm be test fired and the resulting known exemplar be uploaded into the database. When an image is uploaded, NIBIN's "Correlation Engine" automatically uses algorithms to compare its unique markings against millions of existing records, and generates a list of potential matches. Before a physical examination, a technician uses an IBIS MATCHPOINT analysis to perform a side-by-side comparison, of the digital images. If the technician and reviewer agree on a match, its considered a "NIBIN Lead." This lead is not a final conclusion, and more so a step forward in the investigation. A "NIBIN Hit" is reached when a qualified firearm expert and other methods of examination, are compared physically, and shown a match.

In the 1990s, there were two databases that were formed for storage of pictures of shell casings and bullets in gun crimes. The first was the Drugfire system which was used by the FBI. The second, the IBIS (Integrated Ballistic Identification System) was created by Forensic Technology, Inc. and eventually bought by the Alcohol Tobacco and Firearms (ATF) in 1993. The FBI and ATF realized that their systems would not work together, and they needed to find a way to share information between them. The NIBIN board was created in 1997, in hopes of creating one imaging system. A year after the creation of the NIBIN board, both the ATF and FBI decided to put their resources together toward one of the systems, and created the National Integrated Ballistics Information Network, with IBIS as the system.

== Criticisms ==
Firearm examiners have attempted to determine the shooter's position by the location of spent bullet casings. The use of ejection pattern studies were originally part of incident reconstruction and methods for determining shooter location continue to be explained in major crime scene examination books. However, the validity of ejection pattern analysis has been brought into question by multiple studies that look at the reproducibility and end determination of shooter position by qualified examiners. Studies have shown that over 25% of spent casings land somewhere other than to the right and rear of the shooter. This is the most commonly accepted location for where spent cartridge casings should fall, and the large percentage of casings that end up somewhere else raises concerns for the validity of the examination technique. Investigators should only present a location gained from an ejection pattern study as a tentative estimate when using the information in a courtroom setting.

Prior to September 2005, comparative bullet-lead analysis was performed on bullets found at a scene that were too destroyed for striation comparison. The technique would attempt to determine the unique elemental breakdown of the bullet and compare it to seized bullets possessed by a suspect. Review of the method found that the breakdown of elements found in bullets could be significantly different enough to potentially allow for two bullets from separate sources to be correlated to each other. However, there are not enough differences to definitely match a bullet from a crime scene to one taken from a suspect's possession. An additional report in 2004 from the National Academy of Sciences (NAS) found that the testimony given regarding comparative bullet-lead analysis was overstated and potentially "misleading under the federal rules of evidence". In 2005, the Federal Bureau of Investigation indicated that they would no longer be performing comparative bullet-lead analysis.

Further criticism came from the 2009 NAS report on the current state of various forensic fields in the United States. The report's section on firearm examination focused on the lack of defined requirements that are necessary in order to determine "matches" between known and unknown striations. The NAS stated that, "sufficient studies have not been done to understand the reliability and repeatability of the methods." Without defined procedures on what is and what isn't considered "sufficient agreement" the report states that forensic firearm examination contains fundamental problems that need to be addressed by the forensic community through a set of repeatable scientific studies that outline standard operating procedures that should be adopted by all firearm examiners. Another report issued in 2016 by the United States President's Council of Advisors on Science and Technology confirmed the NAS's findings, finding only one appropriately designed study that examined the rate of false positives and reliability amongst firearm examiners.

In 2020 Itiel E. Dror and Nicholas Scurich looked at the validity of ballistic forensic experts when attempting to make an identification of a shell or bullet. They found that while some experts would come to the conclusion that the bullets were a definite match, another expert looking at the same evidence would determine it inconclusive. Dror and Scurich argue an "inconclusive" determination affects the error rate for the study, and provides very little confidence in the overall findings of the scientists. According to Dror and Scurich, the error rate, which was zero to one percent, could be higher. Their reasoning behind this is that if an "answer" was marked as inconclusive, it must count as a correct answer which decreases the error rate making it lower than it probably should be. They wondered how different the error rate would be if inconclusive was not an option. In addition, Dror and Scruich noted that the scientists seemed to come up with a more conclusive decision on the evidence if there was the added part of a human life hanging in the balance. In 2021 Alex Biederman and Kyriakos N. Kotsoglou responded to the Dror and Scurich paper and raised issues. Some of the issues raised by Biederman and Kotsoglou included: a paradox in which examiners' results agreed with ground truth but would be considered "error" via Dror and Scurich's proposals. Biederman and Kotsoglou also pointed out that Dror and Scurich's proposals would set false incentives where examiners would be directed to be "divining what the mythical forensic wisdom of the consensus opinion might (and hence enshrine the false belief in the existence of such wisdom), be rather than the ground truth". Biederman and Kotsoglou concluded "In all, our analysis does not leave much intact from recent attempts to label 'inconclusives as errors."

== See also ==
- Edward O. Heinrich
- Ballistics
- Crime reconstruction
- Evidence packaging
- Forensic examination of 3D-printed firearms
