= California Assembly Bill 1471 (2007) =

AB 1471 or AB 1471 Crime Gun Identification Act of 2007 is legislation passed by the California State Senate on September 6, 2007, and then by the California State Assembly on September 10, 2007, with votes of 21–17 and 43–29 respectively.

It was then signed into law by Governor Arnold Schwarzenegger on October 13, 2007, becoming the first legislation of its kind to enact microstamping of firearms. Its implementation was then placed on hold. The hold was lifted in 2013.

California's "unsafe firearm" laws, which include AB 1471, do not apply to any firearms used or purchased by any law enforcement agency.

== Purpose ==
AB 1471 changes California definitions of "unsafe handgun" and also requires that:

"7) Commencing January 1, 2010, for all semiautomatic pistols that are not already listed on the roster pursuant to Section 12131, it is not designed and equipped with a microscopic array of characters that identify the make, model, and serial number of the pistol, etched or otherwise imprinted in two or more places on the interior surface or internal working parts of the pistol, and that are transferred by imprinting on each cartridge case when the firearm is fired, provided that the Department of Justice certifies that the technology used to create the imprint is available to more than one manufacturer unencumbered by any patent restrictions. The Attorney General may also approve a method of equal or greater reliability and effectiveness in identifying the specific serial number of a firearm from spent cartridge casings discharged by that firearm than that which is set forth in this paragraph, to be thereafter required as otherwise set forth by this paragraph where the Attorney General certifies that this new method is also unencumbered by any patent restrictions."

== Implementation ==
Implementation of AB 1471 is currently on hold pending investigations into the feasibility of microstamping and patent encumberment.

The Calguns Foundation, a gun rights group, paid to extend the lapsing patent on the technology to further delay the law from taking effect. Gene Hoffman, chairman of the group said, "It was a lot cheaper to keep the patent in force than to litigate over the issues." Hoffman added that he believed the law amounted to a gun ban in California. Todd Lizotte, the engineer who developed the technology, said he wanted the patents to lapse and the technology to be in the public domain.

On May 17, 2013, California Attorney General Kamala Harris announced that micro-stamping had cleared all technological and patenting hurdles and would be required on newly sold semiautomatics, effective immediately. However, handguns already approved for sale but lacking this technology may still be sold as long as they remain on the Roster of Not Unsafe Handguns.

== See also ==
- Gun control in the United States
- Firearm microstamping
