= National Integrated Ballistic Information Network =

Specialized US computer network

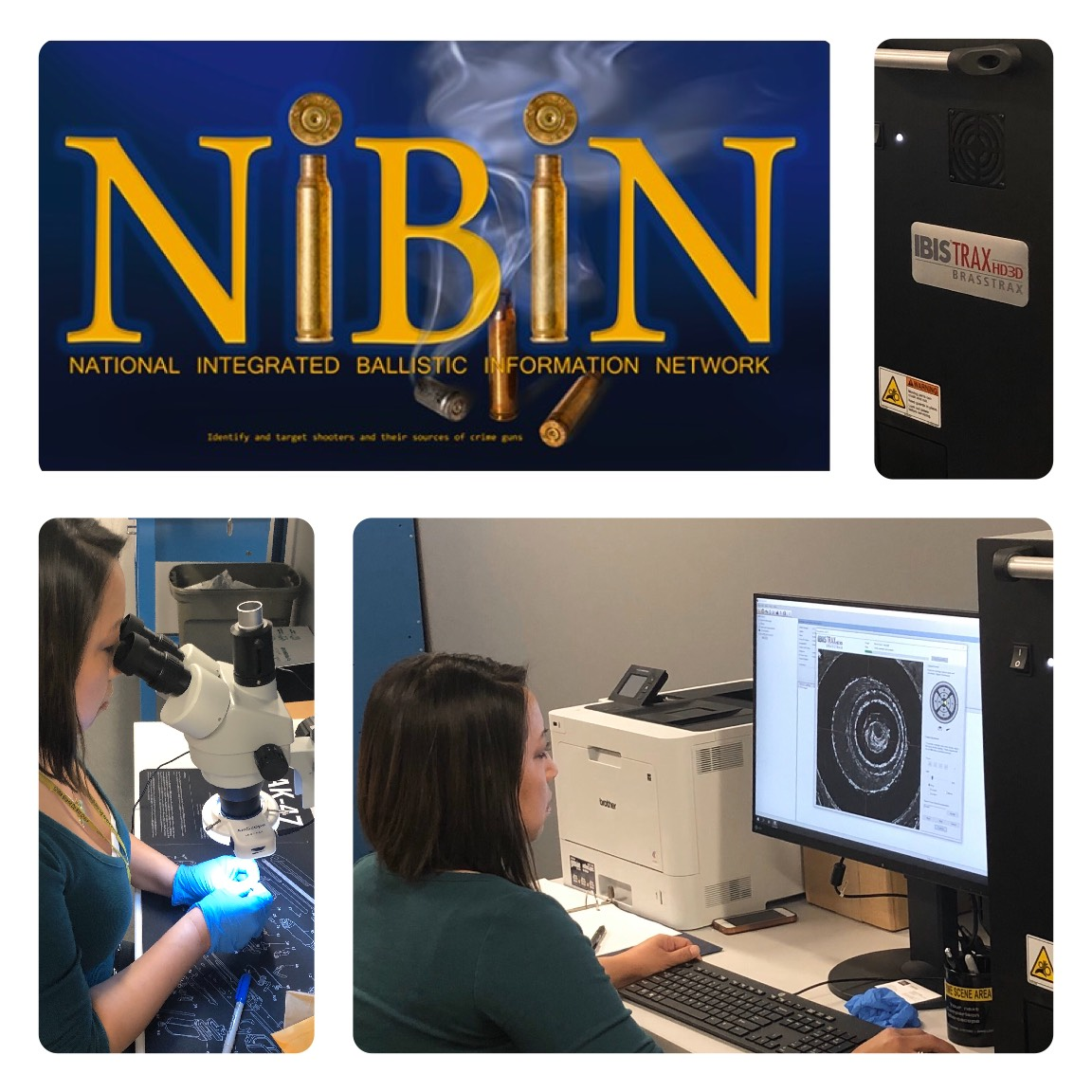
A promotional image from NIBIN published in 2021.

The National Integrated Ballistic Information Network or NIBIN is a specialized computer network in the United States. It contains digital images of recovered pieces of ballistic evidence.

Running on the Integrated Ballistic Identification System or IBIS platform, NIBIN enables U.S. law enforcers to rapidly determine if a piece of recovered ballistic evidence came from a firearm that has been previously used in a crime.

There are certain criteria that must be met prior to entering information into the NIBIN database. For instance, cartridge cases from a .22 caliber firearm or a revolver are normally not entered.

Using NIBIN, law enforcement staff can identify firearms in new cases that were used in prior incidents. A series of seventeen different Washington state crime scenes involving seven firearms, and three different agencies in two counties, was identified using information provided by IBIS/NIBIN.

== Organizational purpose ==
In 1999, the Bureau of Alcohol, Tobacco, Firearms and Explosives (ATF) established and began administration of the National Integrated Ballistic Information Network. In this program, ATF administers automated ballistic imaging technology for law enforcement, forensic science, and attorney agencies in the United States that have entered into a formal agreement with ATF to enter ballistic information into NIBIN. Partners use Integrated Ballistic Identification Systems to acquire digital images of the markings made on spent ammunition recovered from a crime scene or a crime gun test fire and then compare those images against earlier entries via electronic image comparison. If a high-confidence candidate for a match emerges, firearms examiners compare the original evidence with a microscope to confirm the match.

== See also ==
- Automated firearms identification
- Integrated Ballistic Identification System
