= Integrated Ballistics Identification System =

The Integrated Ballistics Identification System, or IBIS, is the brand of the Automated firearms identification system manufactured by Forensic Technology WAI, Inc., of Montreal, Canada.

== Use ==
IBIS has been adopted as the platform of the National Integrated Ballistic Information Network (NIBIN) program, which is run by the United States Bureau of Alcohol, Tobacco, Firearms and Explosives (ATF). NIBIN tracks about 100,000 guns used in crimes. The integration of technology into about 220 sites across the continental US and its territories facilitates sharing of information between different law enforcement groups. The rapid dissemination of ballistics information, in turn, allows for tracking of gun-specific information and connection of a particular firearm to multiple crimes irrespective of geographic location. A National Research Council report has found that with the NIBIN dataset, a bullet retrieved from a crime scene will generate about 10 possible matches, with about a 75-95% chance of a successful match.

While some groups have advocated laws requiring all firearms sold be test-fired and registered in such a system, success has been mixed. In 2005, a Maryland State Police report recommended a law requiring all handguns sold in the state be registered in their IBIS system be repealed, as at the cost of $2.5 million the system had not produced "any meaningful hits". The Maryland system was shut down in 2015 due to its ineffectiveness. By 2008, the New York COBIS system, which costs $4 million per year, had not produced any hits leading to prosecutions in 7 years of operation. The system has been more successful when used to track guns used by and found on criminals.

== In Television ==
IBIS is frequently mentioned in modern television programs, fictional and otherwise, that use forensics to aid in solving crimes. These television shows include CSI: Crime Scene Investigation and its spinoffs, amongst others. Forensic Technology helped develop an interactive exhibit, 'CSI: The Experience' that showcased the company's technology.

== See also ==
- National Ballistics Intelligence Service, a similar body in the United Kingdom
