= Calvin Hooker Goddard =

American forensic scientist

Calvin Goddard
- Born: October 30, 1891; Baltimore, Maryland, United States
- Military career
- Allegiance: United States
- Branch: Army
- Rank: Colonel
- Other work: Forensic scientist, army officer, academic, researcher

Calvin Hooker Goddard (30 October 1891 – 22 February 1955) was a forensic scientist, army officer, academic, researcher and a pioneer in forensic ballistics. He examined the bullet casings in the 1929 St. Valentine's Day Massacre and showed that the guns used were not police issued weapons, leading the investigators to conclude it was a mob hit.

== Biography ==
Goddard was born in Baltimore, Maryland. After graduating from the Boys' Latin School of Maryland in 1907, he graduated with a Bachelor of Arts degree in 1911 from the Johns Hopkins University, later earning a medical degree and graduating 1915.

He joined the United States Army and became a Colonel. He was also a professor of police science at Northwestern University and the military editor of the Encyclopædia Britannica. He was also the editor of the American Journal of Police Science, America's first scientific police journal. Colonel Goddard commanded the US Army Crime Laboratory in Japan for a number of years after World War II. Calvin Goddard brought professionalism, the use of the scientific method, and reliability to Forensic Firearm Identification, at a time when charlatanism was rampant in this field. His testimony in 1923 in the Frye case and others, paved the way for judicial acceptance of Firearms Identification. According to Goddard's grandson, he may have been the only army officer who served in four branches: Ordnance Corps, Military Police Corps, Medical Corps and became a Military Historian.

He died on 22 February 1955.

== Forensic ballistics ==
In 1925 Goddard wrote an article for Army Ordnance titled "Forensic Ballistics" in which he described the use of the comparison microscope regarding firearms investigations. He is generally credited with the conception of the term "forensic ballistics", though he later admitted it to be an inadequate name for the science.

In April 1925, Major Goddard established the Bureau of Forensic Ballistics in New York City with C. E. Waite, Philip O. Gravelle and John H. Fisher. The Bureau was formed to provide firearms identification services throughout America. Goddard researched, authored and spoke extensively on the subject of forensic ballistics and firearms identification, becoming the internationally renowned pioneer in forensic ballistics.

The Bureau of Forensic Ballistics was the United States’ first independent criminalistics laboratory, which Goddard headed, and where ballistics, fingerprinting, blood analysis and trace evidence were brought under one roof. When the lab began publishing the American Journal of Police Science, which was edited by Colonel Goddard, FBI Director J. Edgar Hoover strongly encouraged his special agents in charge to subscribe to it and he supplied articles on fingerprint issues and Bureau responsibilities to the journal. The following year the Bureau contributed three articles for the journal's series entitled “Organized Protection Against Organized Crime”. Hoover also sent a number of representatives to a symposium that Goddard sponsored on scientific crime detection. He was also an advisor to FBI when they set up a similar forensic laboratory.

== Comparison microscope ==
Philip O. Gravelle developed the comparison microscope for the identification of fired bullets and cartridge cases with the support and guidance of Major Calvin H. Goddard. It was a giant leap in the science of firearms identification in forensic science. The firearm from which a bullet or cartridge case has been fired is identified by the comparison of the unique striae left on the bullet or cartridge case from the worn, machined metal of the barrel, breach block, extractor, or firing pin in the gun. It was Gravelle who mistrusted his memory. "As long as he could inspect only one bullet at a time with his microscope, and had to keep the picture of it in his memory until he placed the comparison bullet under the microscope, scientific precision could not be attained. He invented the comparison microscope and Goddard made it work." Sir Sydney Smith also appreciated the idea, emphasizing the importance of stereo-microscope in forensic science and firearms identification. He took the comparison microscope to Scotland and introduced it to the European scientists for firearms identification and other forensic uses.

== Sacco and Vanzetti Case ==
Nicola Sacco and Bartolommeo Vanzetti were two Italian-born American anarchists, who were arrested for the murder of security guard Alessandro Berardelli and the robbery of US$15,766.51 from the factory's payroll in South Braintree, Massachusetts during the afternoon of April 15, 1920. During the trial a worldwide outcry arose, with the firm belief based on railroaded justice and racial prejudice. On April 8, 1927, their appeals exhausted, Sacco and Vanzetti were finally sentenced to death in the electric chair. A worldwide outcry arose and Governor Alvin T. Fuller finally agreed to postpone the executions and set up a committee to reconsider the case. By this time, firearms examination had improved considerably, and it was now known that an automatic pistol could be traced by several different methods if both bullet and casing were recovered from the scene. Automatic pistols could now be traced by unique markings of the rifling on the bullet, by firing pin indentations on the fired primer, or by unique ejector and extractor marks on the casing. The committee appointed to review the case used the services of Major Calvin Goddard in 1927. Major Goddard used Philip Gravelle's newly invented comparison microscope and helixometer, a hollow, lighted magnifier probe used to inspect gun barrels, to make an examination of Sacco's .32 Savage Model 1907, the bullet that allegedly killed Berardelli, and the spent casings allegedly recovered from the scene of the crime. (Defenders of Sacco and Vanzetti claim that the bullet and cartridge case linked to Sacco's pistol were substituted for genuine evidence by the Massachusetts police.) In the presence of one of the defense experts, he fired several test bullets from Sacco's gun into a wad of cotton and prepared them for a comparative examination. He then put the ejected shell casings on the comparison microscope next to casings recovered at the South Braintree murder scene. Then he analyzed them carefully. The third bullet, designated Bullet III matched the rifling marks found on the barrel of Sacco's pistol, while firing pin marks on a .32 spent casing recovered from the murder scene matched a test shell casing known to have been fired from Sacco's pistol. Even the defense expert agreed that the two cartridges had been fired from the same gun. The second original defense expert also concurred. The committee upheld the convictions. Nicola Sacco and Bartolomeo Vanzetti were found guilty and executed via electrocution in Massachusetts on August 23, 1927.

=== Later Investigations ===
One piece of evidence supporting the possibility of Sacco's guilt arose in 1941 when anarchist leader Carlo Tresca, a member of the Sacco and Vanzetti Defense Committee, told Max Eastman, "Sacco was guilty but Vanzetti was innocent." Eastman published an article recounting his conversation with Tresca in National Review in 1961. Later, others would confirm being told the same information by Tresca, but Tresca's daughter insisted she never told him. Others pointed to an ongoing feud between Tresca and the Galleanists, claiming the famous anarchist was just trying to get even.

In October 1961, ballistics tests were run with improved technology using Sacco's pistol. The results confirmed that the bullet that killed Berardelli in 1920 came from the same .32 ACP taken from the pistol in Sacco's possession. Subsequent investigations in 1983 also supported Goddard's findings, however, supporters of innocence have disputed both tests, nothing that ballistics experts conducting the first test had claimed Sacco's guilt even before the tests, and that by the 1980s, the old bullets and guns were far too rusty to prove anything. There was also no evidence Sacco had fired the gun.

The relevance of this evidence was challenged in 1987 when Charlie Whipple, a former Globe editorial page editor, stated that while working as a reporter back in 1937, he had a conversation with Boston Police Sergeant Edward J. Seibolt. According to Whipple, Seibolt told him that he was part of a "father-and-son ballistics team" who had worked on the Sacco and Vanzetti case, and that "we switched the murder weapon in that case." When Whipple asked why, Seibolt replied "we suspected the other side of switching weapons, so we just switched them back." When Whipple asked if he could print Seibolt's statement, Seibolt replied "If you do, I'll call you a liar." Whipple's story remained unsubstantiated, as Seibolt died in 1961 and never corroborated the story. Moreover, police records indicate that Seibolt was only a Patrolman at the time of the Sacco and Vanzetti trial, and did not earn a promotion to Sergeant and a position as a ballistics expert with the Boston Police Department until October 1935. A full transcript of the hearings, on microfilm at Harvard Law School, shows that Judge Webster Thayer made no determination as to who had switched the barrels, but merely ordered the rusty barrel restored to Sacco's pistol.

Sacco's pistol is also claimed to have passed in and out of police custody, and to have been dismantled several times, both in 1924 prior to the gun barrel switch, and again between 1927 and 1961. The main problem with these charges is that the match to Sacco's gun was based not only the .32 pistol, but also to the same-caliber bullet that killed Berardelli, as well as to spent casings found at the scene. In addition to tampering with the pistol, the gun switcher/dismantler would also have had to access police evidence lockers and exchange the bullet from Berardelli's body and all spent casings retrieved by police, or else locate the actual murder weapon, then switch barrel, firing pin, ejector, and extractor, all before Goddard's examination in 1927 when the first match was made to Sacco's gun. However, skeptics of Sacco's guilt have repeatedly pointed to a single anomaly — that several witnesses to the crime insisted the gunman, alleged to be Sacco, fired four bullets into Berardelli. "He shot at Berardelli probably four or five times," one witness said. "He stood guard over him.” If this was true, many ask, how could only one of the fatal bullets be linked to Sacco's gun? In 1927, the defense raised the suggestion that the fatal bullet had been planted, calling attention to the awkward scratches on the base of the bullet that differed from those on other bullets. The Lowell Commission dismissed this claim as desperate but in 1985, historians William Kaiser and David Young made a compelling case for a switch in their book "Post-Mortem: New Evidence in the Case of Sacco and Vanzetti."
