= Drugfire =

Drugfire is a multimedia database imaging system that automates the comparison of images of bullet cartridge cases, shell casings and bullets that was developed by MSI (Mnemonic System Inc.). It is a multimedia database imaging system that allows examiners from across the United States to compare and link evidence obtained in the form of spent cartridges and other ammunition casings.

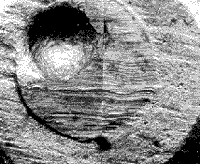
Ammunition under a microscope that is being scanned using Drugfire.

== Development ==
Before Drugfire was invented, firearm examiners had to rely on a technique devised in the 1920s to compare ammunition markings. This involved looking at a casing under a microscope and the examiner had to compare the two casings to see if there were similar markings on the bullet which would most likely mean that the bullets had been fired from the same gun.

From the years of 1991 and 1992, MSI devolved Drugfire, a forensic imaging system that allows investigators to compare ammunition markings from a specific shooting to databases of seemingly unrelated shootings which allowed the FBI to solve numerous cases.

== Notable cases ==
Drugfire was used by the Oakland Police to solve the murder of Tommie Cain. A month after Cain's shooting death, an Oakland patrol officer pulled over Jovan Reynolds and Henry Bruce for a routine traffic stop. The officer found a .38-caliber revolver in the car, which he took into evidence as both men were felons. When the gun was test-fired and entered into the Drugfire system, police found that its bullet matched the slug that had come from Cain's body. With the information, Reynolds and Bruce were questioned and eventually confessed to the murder. Police investigators said the case would most likely still had been open if not for the use of Drugfire.

Drugfire can identify firing pin impressions or breechface and ejector marks to identify a bullet and the gun it was fired from.
