= Microstamping =

Ballistics identification technology

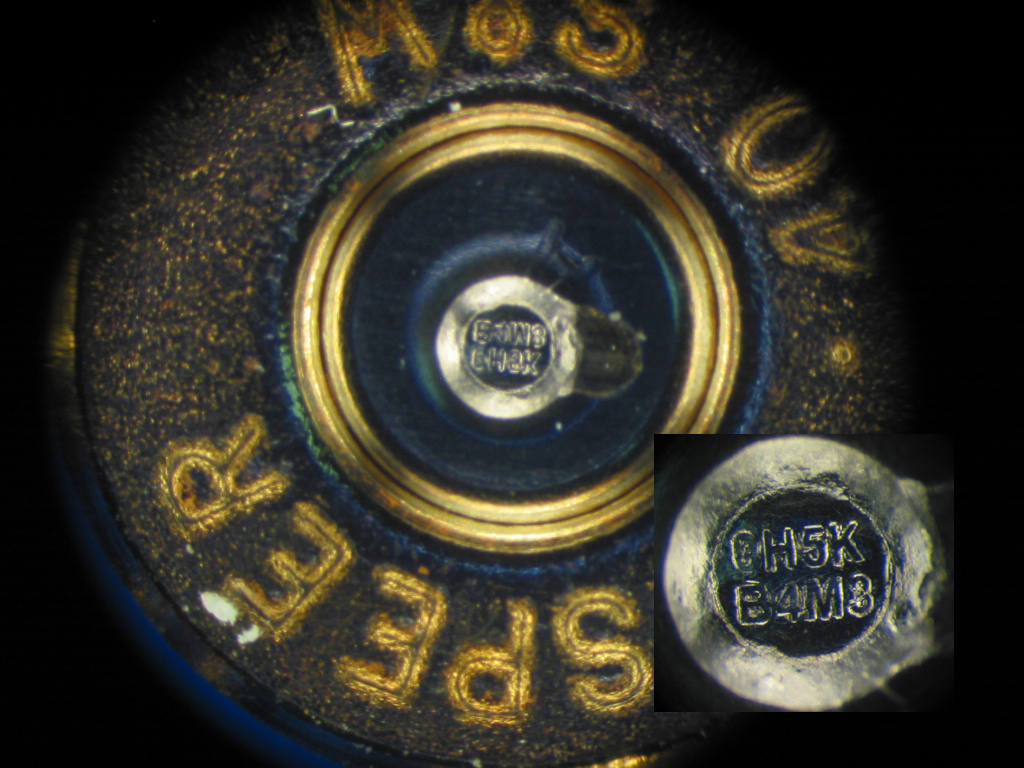
Microstamping test

Microstamping is a proprietary ballistics identification technology. Microscopic markings are engraved onto the tip of the firing pin and onto the breech face of a firearm with a laser. When the gun is fired, these etchings are transferred to the primer by the firing pin and to the cartridge case head by the breech face, using the pressure created when a round is fired. After being fired, if the cases are recovered by police, the microscopic markings imprinted on the cartridges can then be examined by forensic ballistics experts to help trace the firearm to the last registered owner. A California law requiring the use of microstamping technology in all new semiautomatic firearms sold in the state has attracted controversy.

== Legal jurisdictions in the United States ==
=== California ===
Microstamping legislation was passed in California AB 1471 and signed into law on October 14, 2007, but specifically exempts law enforcement. The law has generated controversy.

This technology was to be required in California starting in 2010, but requirements in the law that the technology be available unencumbered by a patent put it on hold. Law enforcement agencies are specifically exempt. One group, the Calguns Foundation, paid a $555 fee to keep the patent active in order to delay implementation. On May 17, 2013, California Attorney General Kamala Harris announced that micro-stamping had cleared all technological and patenting hurdles and would be required on newly sold semiautomatics, effective immediately. However, handguns already approved for sale but lacking this technology may still be sold as long as they remain on the Roster of Not Unsafe Handguns.

In January 2014, the two largest handgun manufacturers in the U.S., Smith & Wesson and Sturm, Ruger & Co., announced their intent to stop selling new semi-automatic handguns in California. They cited the microstamping law as their reason.

Two trade groups, the National Shooting Sports Foundation (NSSF) and the Sporting Arms and Ammunition Manufacturers Institute (SAAMI), have filed a lawsuit seeking both declaratory and injunctive relief against what the groups perceive as an attempt to ban semi-automatic handguns in the state. In February 2015 a federal judge upheld the microstamping requirement, ruling that it does not violate the Second Amendment.

On December 1, 2016, a California Appellate Court reversed the Fresno Superior Court’s dismissal of the NSSF and the SAAMI lawsuit seeking an injunction to block enforcement of the state’s ammunition microstamping law and remanded the case back to the lower court to hear arguments.

On June 28, 2018, in the case of National Shooting Sports Foundation v. California, the California Supreme Court upheld the state's microstamping law. The court wrote, "Impossibility can occasionally excuse noncompliance with a statute. But impossibility does not authorize a court to go beyond interpreting a statute and simply invalidate it." A spokesman for the NSSF said that no new models of semiautomatic handguns will be marketed in California.

On March 20, 2023, in Boland v. Bonta, Judge Cormac Carney of the United States District Court for the Central District of California issued a preliminary injunction against the enforcement of the microstamping requirement along with the loaded chamber indicator and magazine disconnect mechanism requirements of the Unsafe Handgun Act for any new semi-automatic handguns added to the state handgun roster. Judge Carney wrote in his order stating that no handgun in the world has any of those requirements, all of the handguns in the roster do not have any microstamping as they are grandfathered handguns prior to the creation of the roster, and microstamping would be impossible to achieve as the technology does not exist thus violating the Second Amendment. Judge Carney also enjoined a stay in his own preliminary injunction for fourteen days to allow the state to appeal to the United States Court of Appeals for the Ninth Circuit.

Original Text

Commencing January 1, 2010, for all semiautomatic pistols that are not already listed on the roster pursuant to Section 12131, it is not designed and equipped with a microscopic array of characters that identify the make, model, and serial number of the pistol, etched or otherwise imprinted in two or more places on the interior surface or internal working parts of the pistol, and that are transferred by imprinting on each cartridge case when the firearm is fired, provided that the Department of Justice certifies that the technology used to create the imprint is available to more than one manufacturer unencumbered by any patent restrictions. The Attorney General may also approve a method of equal or greater reliability and effectiveness in identifying the specific serial number of a firearm from spent cartridge casings discharged by that firearm than that which is set forth in this paragraph, to be thereafter required as otherwise set forth by this paragraph where the Attorney General certifies that this new method is also unencumbered by any patent restrictions. Approval by the Attorney General shall include notice of that fact via regulations adopted by the Attorney General for purposes of implementing that method for purposes of this paragraph. The microscopic array of characters required by this section shall not be considered the name of the maker, model, manufacturer’s number, or other mark of identification, including any distinguishing number or mark assigned by the Department of Justice, within the meaning of Sections 12090 and 12094.

=== Other jurisdictions ===
Similar legislation is under consideration in New York.

Federal bill H.R.5266, the National Crime Gun Identification Act of 2008, was written by House Rep. Xavier Becerra (D-CA). Senator Edward Kennedy (MA) introduced an identical companion bill in the Senate.

== US National Research Council Study ==
The United States National Research Council released a report in 2008 that endorsed the investigation of microstamping as an alternative to ballistic markings. It had concluded that a national database of ballistic markings is unworkable and that there is not enough scientific evidence that, "every gun leaves microscopic marks on bullets and cartridge cases that are unique to that weapon and remain the same over repeated firings". It described microstamping as a "promising method" that could "attain the same basic goal as the proposed database".

== Objections ==
The SAAMI trade group raises these objections:

- Unscrupulous individuals could collect discarded brass from a firing range and salt crime scenes with microstamped cases, thereby providing false evidence against innocent people and increasing the workload for investigators.
- Firing a large number of rounds will wear down the microstamp.
- Microstamping is an immature, sole-source technology, and has not been subjected to sufficient independent testing. Transfer of microstamped marks to the cases is less reliable than proponents claim.
- High costs for testing the efficacy of the technique must be passed on to customers, increasing the cost of firearms for those who obtain them legally.
- Guns manufactured before an effective date are exempt and the bill does not extend to guns outside of California. There's no possibility that this bill would ever cover enough guns to provide the investigative advantage claimed for it by the proponents.

Specific to California, the chief of the Oakland Police Department says:

- Firearms sold to law enforcement are exempt. Problems could arise if a police officer's firearm is used in a crime or stolen, and the fact that a firearm is "unsafe" if not provided with stamping technology exposes the police to liability.

Technological:

- Manufacturing a gun to meet the microstamping specification is extremely difficult largely due to the requirement of two or more imprints needing to be transferred from the interior of the pistol to the casing. As a result, no production firearm has been able to meet this requirement.

== Manufacturer ==
The proprietary technology was invented and patented by Todd Lizotte and is presently owned by a company he founded called TACLABS, Inc. They are the only company from which this technology can be purchased.

== Additional resources ==
- UC Davis Forensic Science report on firearms microstamping
- Presentation on Capitol Hill about the technology by the developer and some others: Part 1, Part 2, Part 3, Part 4, Part 5, Part 6
- Educational Fund to Stop Gun Violence Microstamping Page
- NSSF Factsheet "Microstamping Technology: Proven Flawed and Imprecise"
