= Comparison microscope =

Type of microscope

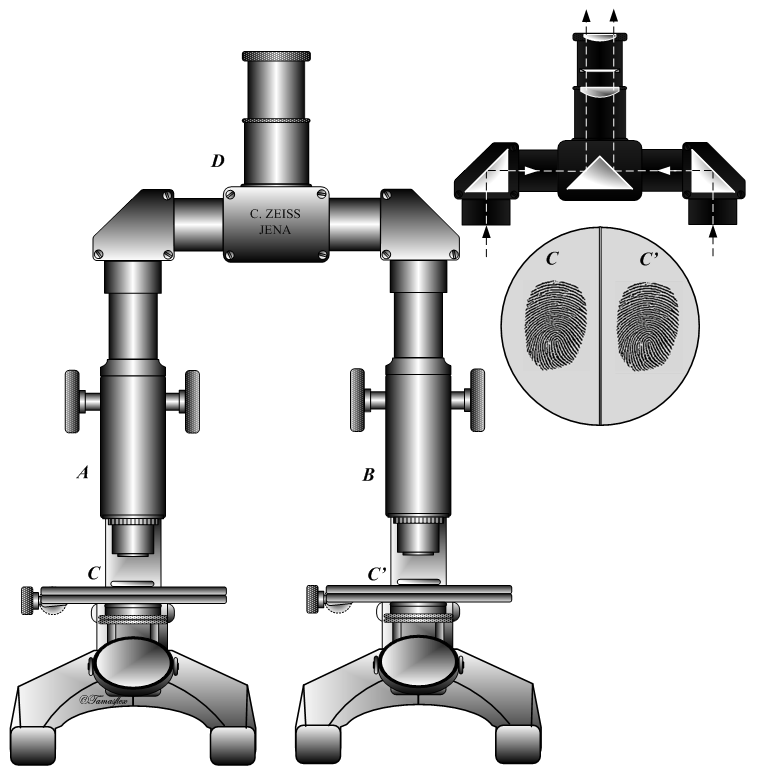
In a comparison microscope, two identical microscopes are connected to a single comparison eyepiece. The viewer sees the images from both microscopes next to one another, as in the inset image.

A comparison microscope is a device used to analyze side-by-side specimens. It consists of two microscopes connected by an optical bridge, which results in a split view window enabling two separate objects to be viewed simultaneously. This avoids the observer having to rely on memory when comparing two objects under a conventional microscope.

== History ==
One of the first prototypes of a comparison microscope was developed in 1913 in Germany.

In 1929, using a comparison microscope adapted for forensic ballistics, Calvin Goddard and his partner Philip Gravelle were able to absolve the Chicago Police Department of participation in the St. Valentine's Day Massacre.

=== Col. Calvin H. Goddard ===
Philip O. Gravelle, a chemist, developed a comparison microscope for use in the identification of fired bullets and cartridge cases with the support and guidance of forensic ballistics pioneer Calvin Goddard. It was a significant advance in the science of firearms identification in forensic science. The firearm from which a bullet or cartridge case has been fired is identified by the comparison of the unique striae left on the bullet or cartridge case from the worn, machined metal of the barrel, breach block, extractor, or firing pin in the gun. It was Gravelle who mistrusted his memory. "As long as he could inspect only one bullet at a time with his microscope, and had to keep the picture of it in his memory until he placed the comparison bullet under the microscope, scientific precision could not be attained. He therefore developed the comparison microscope and Goddard made it work." Calvin Goddard perfected the comparison microscope and subsequently popularized its use. Sir Sydney Smith also appreciated the idea, emphasizing its importance in forensic science and firearms identification. He took the comparison microscope to Scotland and introduced it to the European scientists for firearms identification and other forensic science needs.

== Modern comparison microscope ==
The modern instrument has many optical, mechanical and electronic refinements, including fiber optic illumination, video capabilities, digital imaging, automatic exposure for conventional photography, etc. Despite this evolution, however, the basic tools and techniques have remained unchanged which are to determine whether or not ammunition components were fired by a single firearm based on unique and reproducible microscopic and class characteristics, or to reach a "no conclusion" result if insufficient marks are present.

Since, ballistic identification has benefited from a long series of structural, scientific and technological advances, law enforcement agencies have established forensic laboratories and researchers have learned much more about how to match bullets and cartridge cases to the guns used to fire them, and comparison microscopes have become more sophisticated. By the end of the 1980s, ballistic identification was an established sub-specialty of forensic science.

Visualization tools have also been developed to allow the firearms examiner to verify the degree of similarity between any two tool-marks in question. These are designed to simulate the operation of the comparison microscope but are capable of rendering a 2D view of the 3D surfaces in a manner similar to that of the conventional comparison microscope.

== Forensic ballistics ==
As with most firearms, the fired ammunition components may acquire sufficient unique and reproducible microscopic marks to be identifiable as having been fired by a single firearm. Making these comparisons is correctly referred to as firearms identification, or sometimes called as "ballistics".

Historically, and currently, this forensic discipline ultimately requires a microscopic side-by-side comparison of fired bullets or cartridge cases, one pair at a time, by a forensic examiner to confirm or eliminate the two items as having been fired by a single firearm. For this purpose, the traditional tool of the firearms examiner has been what is often called the ballistics comparison microscope.

The interior of a gun's barrel is machined to have grooves (called rifling) that force the bullet to rotate as it travels along it. These grooves and their counterpart, called "lands" imprint groove and land impressions on the surface of the bullet. Together with these land and groove impressions, imperfections on the barrel surface are incidentally transferred to the bullet's surface. Because these imperfections are randomly generated, during manufacture or due to use, they are unique to each barrel. These patterns or imperfections, therefore, amount to a "signature" that each barrel imprints on each of the bullets fired through it. It is this "signature" on the bullets imparted due to the unique imperfections on the barrel that enable the validation and identification of bullets as having originated from a particular gun. Comparison microscope is used to analyze the matching of the microscopic impressions found on the surface of bullets and casings.

When a firearm or a bullet or cartridge case are recovered from a crime scene, forensic examiners compare the ballistic fingerprint of the recovered bullet or cartridge case with the ballistic fingerprint of a second bullet or cartridge case test-fired from the recovered firearm. If the ballistic fingerprint on the test-fired bullet or cartridge case matches the ballistic fingerprint on the recovered bullet or cartridge case, investigators know that the recovered bullet or cartridge case was also fired from the recovered gun. A confirmed link between a specific firearm and a bullet or cartridge case recovered from a crime scene constitutes a valuable lead, because investigators may be able to connect the firearm to a person, who may then become either a suspect or a source of information helpful to the investigation.

== Notable cases ==
=== Sacco and Vanzetti case ===
Forensic innovator Calvin Goddard offered ballistic identification evidence in 1921 to help secure convictions of accused murderers and anarchists Nicola Sacco and Bartolomeo Vanzetti. On April 8, 1927, Sacco and Vanzetti were finally sentenced to death in the electric chair. A worldwide outcry arose and Governor Alvin T. Fuller finally agreed to postpone the executions and set up a committee to reconsider the case. By this time, firearms examination had improved considerably, and it was now known that a semi-automatic pistol could be traced by several different methods if both bullet and casing were recovered from the scene. Automatic pistols could now be traced by unique markings of the rifling on the bullet, by firing pin indentations on the fired primer, or by unique ejector and extractor marks on the casing. The committee appointed to review the case used the services of Calvin Goddard in 1927. Goddard used Philip Gravelle's newly invented comparison microscope and helixometer, a hollow, lighted magnifier probe used to inspect gun barrels, to make an examination of Sacco's .32 Colt, the bullet that killed Berardelli, and the spent casings recovered from the scene of the crime. In the presence of one of the defense experts, he fired a bullet from Sacco's gun into a wad of cotton and then put the ejected casing on the comparison microscope next to casings found at the scene. Then he looked at them carefully. The first two casings from the robbery did not match Sacco's gun, but the third one did. Even the defense expert agreed that the two cartridges had been fired from the same gun. The second original defense expert also concurred. The committee upheld the convictions. In October 1961, ballistics tests were run with improved technology using Sacco's Colt automatic. The results confirmed that the bullet that killed the victim, Berardelli in 1920 came from the same .32 Colt Auto taken from the pistol in Sacco's possession. Subsequent investigations in 1983 also supported Goddard's findings.

=== St. Valentine's Day massacre ===
Colonel Goddard was the key forensic expert in solving the 1929 St. Valentine's Day Massacre in which seven gangsters were killed by rival Al Capone mobsters dressed as Chicago police officers. It also led to the establishment of the United States' first independent criminological laboratory, which was located at Northwestern University and headed by Goddard. At this new lab, ballistics, fingerprinting, blood analysis and trace evidence were all brought under one roof. In 1929, using a comparison microscope adapted for the ballistics comparison by his partner, Phillip Gravelle, Goddard used similar techniques to absolve the Chicago Police Department of participation in the St. Valentine's Day Massacre. The case of Sacco and Vanzetti, which took place in Bridgewater, Massachusetts, is responsible for popularizing the use of the comparison microscope for bullet comparison. Forensic expert Calvin Goddard's conclusions were upheld when the evidence was re-examined in 1961.

== See also ==
- Association of Firearm and Tool Mark Examiners
- Rifling
