= Breechface =

Firearm component

The breechface is the front part of the breechblock that makes contact with the cartridge in a firearm. The breech block (or breechblock) in a gun is what holds a round in the chamber, and absorbs the recoil of the cartridge when the round is fired, preventing the cartridge case from moving.
