= List of weapons in Malayan Emergency =

== Infantry weapons ==
=== Commonwealth ===
==== Sidearms ====
- Webley Revolver
- Enfield No. 2
- Smith and Wesson Model 10
- M1911
- Colt Model 1903 Pocket Hammerless: used by high-rank officer such as General Sir Gerald Templer
- Browning Hi-Power

==== Rifles ====
- Lee–Enfield
- De Lisle carbine
- Type 30 rifle
- M1 carbine
- M2 carbine
- M1903 Springfield
- L1A1 Self-Loading Rifle

==== Shotgun ====
- Browning Auto-5
- Remington Model 11

==== Submachine gun ====
- Thompson submachine gun
- Sten
- Sterling submachine gun
- M50 Reising
- Owen gun
- Madsen M-50
- M3 submachine gun

==== Machine gun ====
- Bren light machine gun
- Lewis gun
- Vickers machine gun
- Browning M1917

==== Grenade ====
- Mills bombs

==== Anti-tank weapons ====
- Boys anti-tank rifle
- PIAT

=== Communist guerrillas ===
==== Sidearms ====
- Webley revolver
- Enfield No. 2
- Browning Hi-Power
- M1911 pistol: used by Muhammad Indera during Bukit Kepong incident
- Mauser C96: supplied by Soviet Union
- Luger pistol
- Walther P38
- TT pistol: supplied by Soviet Union

==== Rifles ====
- Lee–Metford
- Lee–Enfield
- Jungle carbine
- M1 and M1A1 carbine
- Arisaka rifle
- Gewehr 1888 : supplied by Soviet Union
- Gewehr 98 and Kar 98k: supplied by Soviet Union
- M1903 Springfield
- Mosin–Nagant: supplied by Soviet Union
- M95 Mannlicher carbines

==== Shotgun ====
- Browning Auto-5
- Remington Model 11
- Harrington & Richardson Topper Shotgun

==== Submachine gun ====
- Thompson submachine gun
- Sten MK2 and MK 5
- Sterling submachine gun
- M50 Reising
- PPSh-41
- Type 100 submachine gun
- Madsen M-50:Captured from The Commonwealth of Nations troops

==== Machine gun ====
- Bren gun
- Type 11 light machine gun
- Type 92 heavy machine gun
- Type 96 light machine gun
- Type 99 light machine gun

==== Grenade launcher ====
- Type 10 grenade discharger
- Type 89 grenade discharger

==== Hand grenade ====
- Mills bomb
- F1 Grenade
- Type 10 grenade
- Type 89 grenade

==== Anti-tank weapon ====
- PIAT
