= Teishin Shudan =

Japanese military unit during the second world war

Teishin Shudan (挺進集団, Raiding Group) was a Japanese special forces/airborne unit during World War II. The unit was a division-level force, and was part of the Imperial Japanese Army Air Force (IJAAF). The Teishin units were therefore distinct from the marine parachute units of the Special Naval Landing Forces.

== History ==
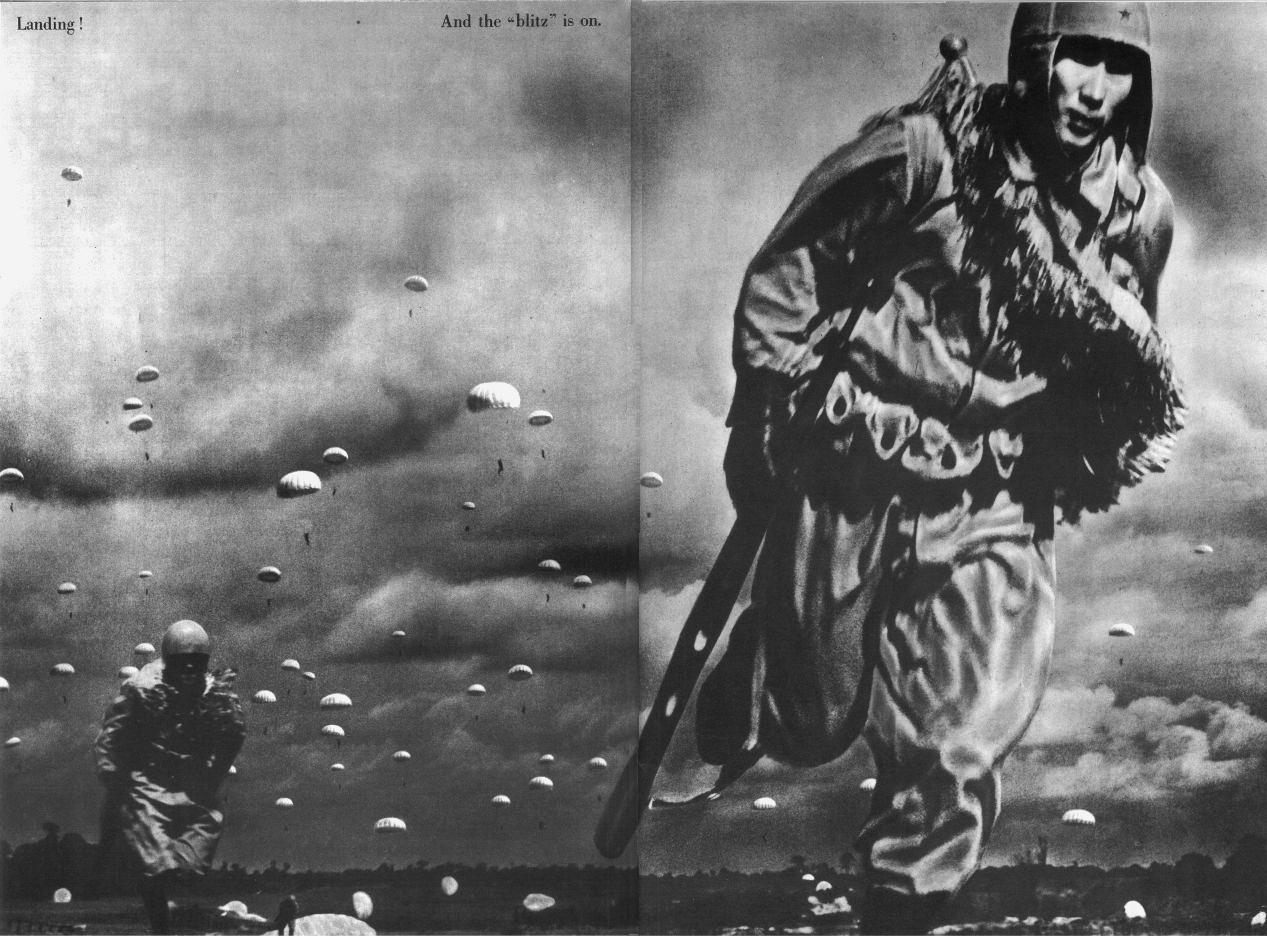
IJA Paratroopers Teishin Shudan in Palembang February 13-15, 1942

The Imperial Japanese Army developed an airborne paratroop force in the late 1930s, but the program did not receive much attention by the Imperial General Headquarters until review of the success of similar German paratroop units during the Blitzkrieg of 1940.

Army paratroops were first deployed in combat during the Battle of Palembang, on Sumatra in the Netherlands East Indies (now Indonesia) on 14 February 1942. The operation was well-planned, with 425 men of the 1st Parachute Raiding Regiment seizing Palembang airfield, while the paratroopers of the 2nd Parachute Raiding Regiment seized the town and its important oil refinery. However, after the 1st Raiding Regiment departed Japan aboard the transport ship Meiko Maru bound for Indochina, it suddenly caught fire in the South China Sea sinking near Hainan Island on January 3, 1942. All the paratroopers were rescued by the cruiser Kashii but lost all their equipment and were exhausted and therefore did not partake leaving the operation to the 2nd Parachute Raiding Regiment. The IJA paratroopers were subsequently deployed in the Burma campaign only to have their part in the operation aborted.

Following this success, in July 1943, the 1st Glider Tank Troop was formed, with four Type 95 Ha-Go light tanks. This unit was eventually expanded to battalion size, with a tank company using 14 Type 2 Ke-To light tanks, an infantry company, and a motorized transport company.

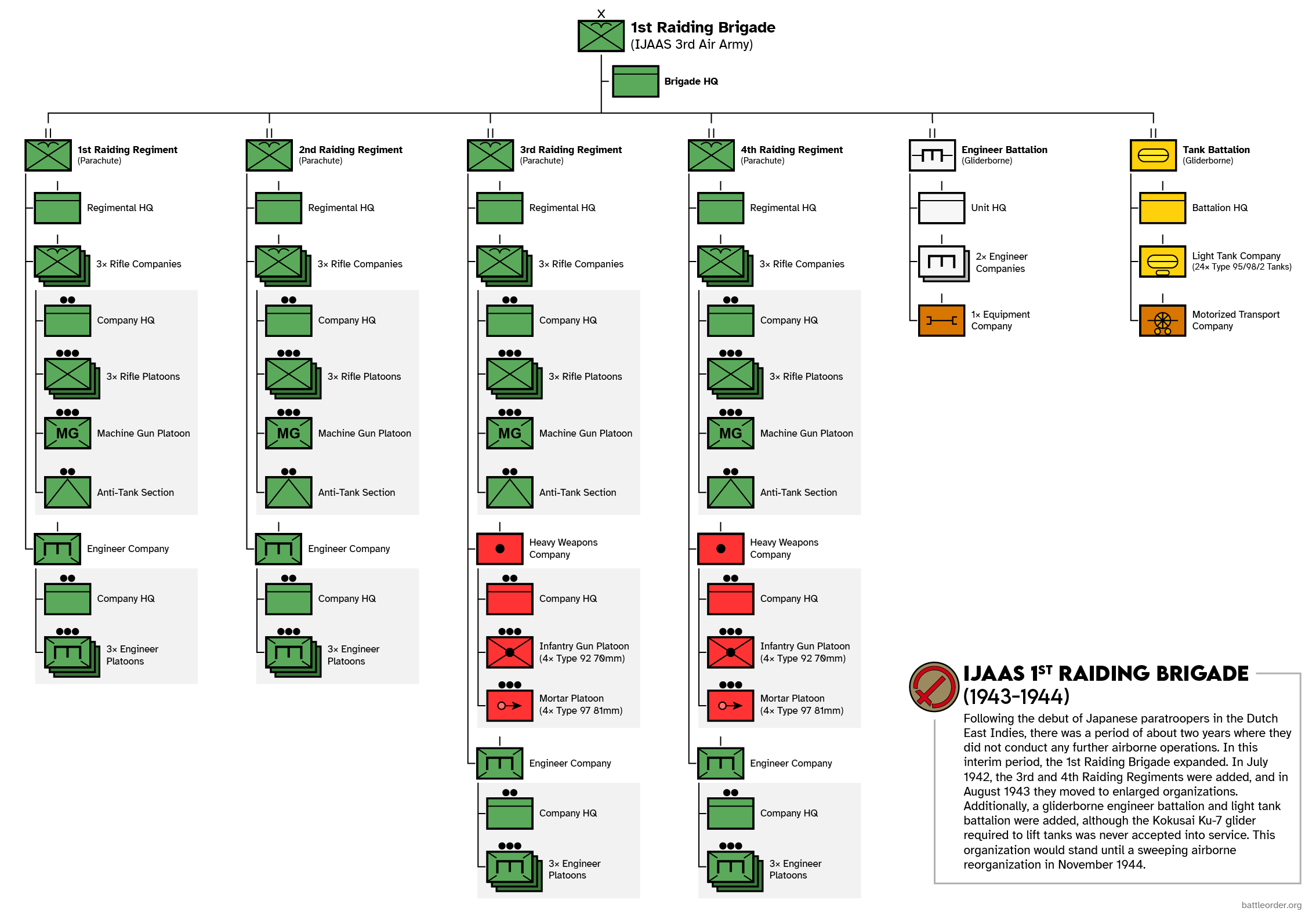
IJAAS 1st Raiding Brigade organization from August 1943 to November 1944.

The paratroop brigades were organized into the Teishin Shudan as the first division-level raiding unit, at the main Japanese airborne base, Karasehara Airfield, Kyūshū, Japan. It was commanded by a major general, and was organized as follows:

- headquarters company (220 personnel)
- aviation brigade
- raiding brigade
- two glider infantry regiments
- raiding artillery company (120 personnel)
- raiding signals company (140 personnel)
- raiding engineer company (250 personnel)

The unit had an estimated 5,575 personnel.

However, as with similar airborne units created by the Allies and other Axis powers, the Japanese paratroops suffered from a disproportionately high casualty rate, and the loss of men who required such extensive and expensive training limited their operations to only the most critical ones. For the most part, the Teishin Shudan was deployed as elite light infantry.

Two regiments of Teishin Shudan were formed into the 1st Raiding Group, commanded by Major General Rikichi Tsukada under the control of the Southern Expeditionary Army Group, during the Philippines campaign. Although structured as a division, its capabilities were much lower, as its six regiments had manpower equivalent to a standard infantry battalion, and it lacked any form of artillery, and had to rely on other units for logistical support. Its men were no longer parachute-trained, but relied on aircraft for transport.

=== Philippines Campaign ===
Some 750 men, mainly from the 2nd Raiding Brigade, of this group were assigned to attack American air bases on Luzon and Leyte on the night of 6 December 1944. They were flown in Ki-57 transports, but most of the aircraft were shot down. Some 300 commandos managed to land in the Burauen area on Leyte. The force destroyed some planes and inflicted numerous casualties before they were annihilated.

The remainder of Teishin Shudan remained based in the Philippines until the end of the war.

== Equipment used by Teishin units ==
=== Army Paratrooper Uniform ===
The uniforms of Japanese Army paratroops during the Palembang Campaign in first stages of the war was similar to that of German Luftwaffe paratroops. The padded leather helmet was later replaced by a steel one, although photographs suggest that the German helmet was actually issued to Japanese parachute troops. The troops wore standard infantry equipment with additional ammunition bandoleers. In the Philippines campaigns later in the war, the uniforms were changed to the standard Army Khaki colour uniform with brown belts and harness, the yellow star in the cap and kepi plus dark or light brown boots and gloves.

In both cases Japanese Army paratroopers wore badges depicting a golden kite, similar to pilot wings, as well as a roundel emblem depicting an opened parachute and star.

=== Weapons ===
- Bayonet (Type 30 bayonet)
- Type 26 revolver
- Type 14 pistol
- Type 94 pistol
- Arisaka rifle
- Type 2 rifle
- Type 100 submachine gun
- Type 96 light machine gun
- Type 99 light machine gun
- Type 97 20 mm anti-tank rifle
- Type 97 grenade
- Type 89 grenade discharger
- Type 97 grenade discharger
- Type 11 70 mm infantry mortar
- Type 99 81 mm mortar
- Type 11 37 mm infantry gun

Some heavy weapons were dropped in special parachute containers.

In the later stages of the war, it was planned that the Teishin units be equipped with some advanced weapons, including experimental anti-tank weapons like the Type 4 70 mm AT Rocket Launcher and Type 5 45mm recoilless gun, but this never occurred.

Armoured support was to be provided by Type 95 Ha-Go light tank among other types. It was also intended that the Teishin units use the Special No. 3 Flying Tank So-Ra or Ku-Ro, amongst the Maeda Ku-6 Flying Tank an experimental winged tank which never went into production.

== See also ==
- Giretsu Kuteitai
- Japanese marine paratroopers of World War II
- Fallschirmjäger (World War II)
- Paratrooper
- Airborne forces
- List of paratrooper forces
- Commando
