= Type 99 grenade =

Type 99 "Kiska" hand grenade
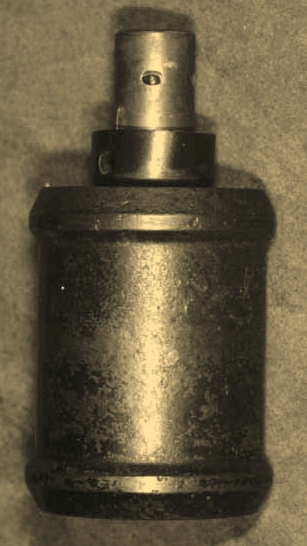
- Japanese Type 99 hand grenade
- Type: Hand grenade/rifle grenade
- Place of origin: Empire of Japan

Service history
- In service: 1939–1945
- Wars: Second Sino-Japanese War; World War II

Production history
- Designed: 1939

Specifications
- Mass: 300 g (11 oz)
- Length: 87 mm (3.4 in)
- Diameter: 41 mm (1.6 in)
- Filling: Cast picric acid
- Filling weight: 58 g (2.0 oz)
- Detonation mechanism: Pyrotechnic delay of 4 to 5 seconds.

The Type 99 hand grenade (九九式手榴弾, Kyūkyū-shiki Teryūdan), also known as the Kiska grenade by the American Army, was an improved version of the Type 97 fragmentation hand grenade used during World War II.

== History ==
Soon after introduction of the Type 97 hand grenade to front line troops, a number of problems arose.

Instability and inaccuracy of the fuse mechanism made the Type 97 almost as much of a menace to the thrower as to the recipient.

Furthermore, the Type 97 was a hand grenade and could not be used with grenade launchers. In 1939, the Army Technical Bureau developed an improved version intended to remove these flaws.

== Design ==
Unlike the earlier Type 91 or Type 97 grenades, the body was not segmented, but was smooth and flanged on both ends. It was also slightly smaller in diameter than the Type 91.

Operation required first removing the safety pin by pulling the cord to which it was attached and then striking the head of the fuse on a hard object, such as a rock or combat helmet, and throwing immediately.

Since the firing pin was integral no screwing or unscrewing of the firing pin holder was necessary, as with earlier model Japanese grenades.

The Type 99 could also be used as a booby trap by removing the safety pin and setting under a floorboard or chair.

=== Accessory ===
The Type 99 hand grenade could either be thrown by hand or fired from a Type 100 grenade discharger.

== Deployment ==
The Type 99 was issued as a standard rifle grenade to Japanese infantrymen in the Second Sino-Japanese War and throughout the various campaigns of World War II.

The first examples to fall into the hands of Allied military intelligence were captured at the Battle of Kiska in the Aleutian Islands, which gave rise to the nickname of "Kiska grenade" by American troops.

== Users ==
- Empire of Japan
  - Imperial Japanese Army
  - Imperial Japanese Navy
    - Japanese Special Naval Landing Forces
