= Japanese marine paratroopers of World War II =

Japanese Marine Paratroopers Special Naval Landing Forces (SNLF) Kaigun Tokubetsu Rikusentai
- Badge of the paratroopers of the Special Naval Landing Forces (SNLF) of the Imperial Japanese Navy
- Active: 1940–1945
- Country: Empire of Japan
- Allegiance: Emperor of Japan
- Branch: Imperial Japanese Navy
- Type: Airborne forces
- Role: Airborne light infantry
- Size: 2 battalions
- Part of: Armed Forces of the Empire of Japan
- Engagements: World War II: Battle of Manado (1942); Battle of Timor (1942–43)

Commanders
- Notable commanders: Commander Toyoaki Horiuchi; Lieutenant Commander Koichi Fukumi

Japanese marine paratroopers were the airborne forces of the Imperial Japanese Navy (IJN) during World War II. The paratroopers served under the Kaigun Tokubetsu Rikusentai or Special Naval Landing Forces (SNLF), the professional marines of the IJN; The SNLF itself was one of several land-based units fielded by the IJN during the interwar period and World War II. Upon the Empire of Japan's defeat in World War II, all IJN land forces were disbanded alongside the IJN proper in 1945. SNLF paratroopers should not be confused with the Imperial Japanese Army's paratroopers, known as Teishin Shudan.

SNLF paratroopers formed two battalions and were operationally subordinated to the Imperial Japanese Navy Air Service. SNLF airborne units were only organized on the very eve of the war, beginning in September 1941. The lightly armed parachute units were intended to be employed in ‘lightning’ strikes and raids in support of short-term strategic objectives. They were not meant to become entangled in heavy pitched battles; they were, however, utilized in such roles as the Japanese military became increasingly desperate for quality troops in the later stages of World War II.

== Formation and tactics ==
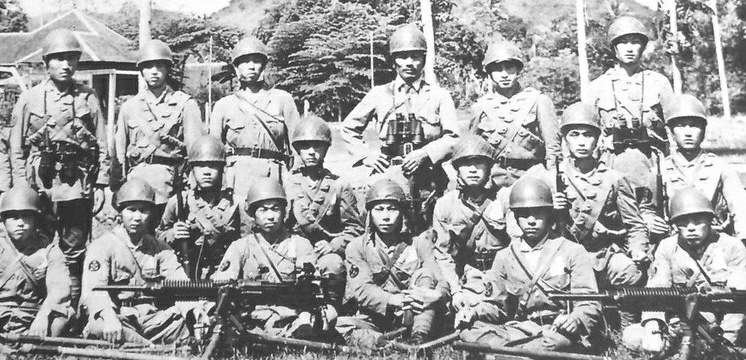
Japanese Special Naval Landing Forces Paratroopers, 1940–1945

The 1st Yokosuka SNLF battalion was formed 20 September 1941, at Yokosuka Naval District, round a battalion of 520 paratroopers. The 3rd Yokosuka (battalion) was formed on 20 November 1941, again at the Naval facility and consisted of 850 men. Nominally, each battalion consisted of three airborne rifle companies, an airborne light anti-tank company (capable of deployment via flying boat), and a headquarters company.

The paratroopers were led by navy officers who had trained at the Imperial Japanese Army infantry school. Although SNLF basic training was different from that of the Japanese Army, the paratroopers were trained at the army base on Kanto Plain. Light arms were furnished from army stocks; heavier material was manufactured by the navy. The first training drop occurred on November 16, 1941.

The Japanese Navy planned to use the paratroop force as a diversion, by co-ordinating the timing of a seaborne assault and parachute drop to create maximum surprise at the point of contact. SNLF paratroopers would land inland from beaches where major amphibious assaults were to occur. In particular, it was intended that paratroopers would disable airfields, preventing enemy warplanes from interfering with amphibious landings. The lightly armed paratroopers would have to attack the air base defenses. If they were successful, it would also allow the Japanese to use the airfield for their own warplanes and was comparable to the use of German Fallschirmjager at the Battle of Crete, in May 1941.

== Operational history ==
Two companies, numbering 849 paratroopers, from the 1st Yokosuka SNLF, carried out Japan's first ever combat air drop, during the Battle of Menado, in the Netherlands East Indies, on January 11, 1942. Four hours before the airborne landings, the 1st Sasebo SNLF had come ashore by sea nearby.

On February 19, 630 paratroopers from the 3rd Yokosuka SNLF were dropped near Kupang, West Timor, and suffered heavy casualties in the Battle of Timor.

In mid-1942 the 1st Yokosuka SNLF returned to its namesake naval base and what was left of the 3rd Yokosuka took part in unopposed landings on islands in the eastern part of the East Indies archipelago. The 3rd Yokosuka returned to Japan by the end of October 1942.

== Equipment ==
Many weapons were the same as army Teishin units, but some heavy weapons were provided from navy stocks. IJNAS land-based planes — transports, heavy bombers and flying boats — were used to deliver the paratroopers.

=== SNLF paratrooper uniforms ===
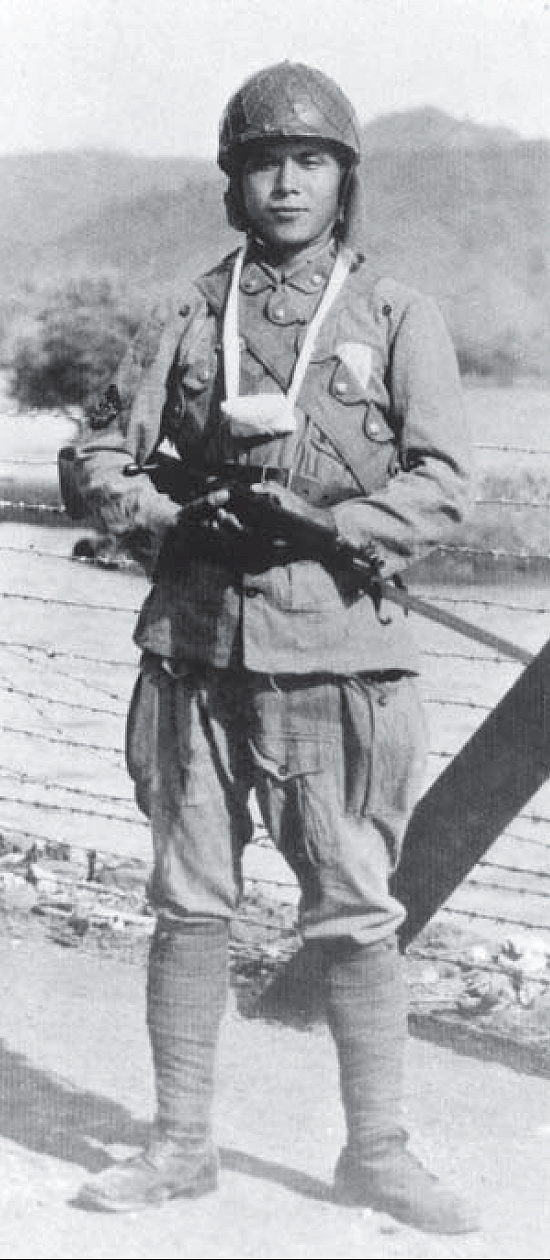
IJN Paratrooper wearing the green field uniform.

The initial uniform for Airborne SNLF troops was based on the German model. It was later replaced by two types of green uniforms made from rip stop parachute silk with built in bandoliers and cargo pockets, being better designed than other paratrooper models of the time. This two-piece uniform was made of 50% cotton/50% silk. The hip length jacket had two differing pocket layouts, one had an angled pistol holster on the right chest, a two-grenade pocket on the left chest, and three smaller pockets for ammunition or grenades on each skirt side. The second version jacket had two pleated chest pockets and a smaller pleated skirt pockets. The trousers featured several variations of hip and cargo pockets. Headgear was similar to the IJA fieldcap but with a chinstrap and integral side and neck piece. Personnel also wore laced high brown leather boots as well as brown leather gloves.

=== Personal equipment ===
The padded leather helmet was later replaced by a steel one based on the IJN's Type 3 but with a cut down rim. They wore standard infantry equipment with additional ammunition bandoliers, along with dark brown boots and gloves. Later a simplified uniform type was used with the same SNLF standard color, and with the same type of belts and harness.

Sometimes a naval life preserver vest was worn over the uniform to carry cartridges and hand grenades. Standard Nambu pistol or revolver and a knife were in belt or boot.

=== Parachute and harness ===
The first specifically designed Japanese military parachute was the Type 01 of 1941, similar to the German RZ version, which had more in common with the Italian D-30 series chute in having a canopy diameter of 28 feet (8.5 metres) and in a pronounced hemispherical shape with skirting and a vent hole for stable flight.

The harness was modified in the later Type 03, leaving out the lift webs, and with the rigging lines brought to a single point connected to a large steel ‘D’ ring behind the paratroopers neck for a more upright controlled landing.

The particular Japanese method of opening the folded and packed chute through the use of static line was quite dangerous and liable to failure. Each paratrooper also carried a 24 feet (7.3 metres) reserve chest-pack, and the basic Japanese naval parachutist training program required jumps between 300–500 feet (90–150 m), which would not give much time to deploy the emergency chute, or let alone delay deploying the main canopy.

=== Aircraft ===
- Nakajima L2D2 Rei Yosoh Type 00 "Tabby"
- Mitsubishi L4M1 (naval version of Mitsubishi Ki-57 "Topsy")
- Mitsubishi G3M2/3 "Nell" Land-based bomber
- Mitsubishi L3Y1/2-L (transport version of Mitsubishi G3M)
- Mitsubishi G4M2 "Betty" Land-based bomber
- Mitsubishi G6M1/2-L (transport version of G4M1/2 Bomber)
- Mitsubishi K3M3-L "Pine"
- Nakajima G5N2-L Shinzan "Liz"
- Nakajima L1N1 (naval version of Nakajima Ki-34 "Thora")
- Nakajima C2N1 (naval version of Nakajima Ki-6)
- Kawanishi H6K2-L flying-boat
- Kawanishi H8K2-L "Emily" flying-boat
- Yokosuka H5Y1 "Cherry"
- Aichi H9A1

The navy also ordered the development of an experimental heavy glider, the Yokosuka MXY5, for airborne operations, but these were never fully developed.

=== Light weapons ===
- Type 94 8 mm pistol
- Type 26 9 mm revolver
- Type 14 8 mm Nambu pistol
- TERA rifle
- Type 99 rifle
- Bayonets
- SIG M1920
- MP 34
- Type 100 submachine gun
- Type 96 light machine gun
- Type 99 light machine gun
- Type 97 20 mm anti-tank rifle
- Type 91 hand grenade
- Type 89 grenade launcher
- Taisho Type 11 70mm infantry mortar
- Type 99 81 mm mortar
- Type 11 37 mm infantry gun

There were plans to equip the paratroop units with light tanks like the Type 95 Ha-Go, to operate as naval Airborne Armor Troop units but this was not implemented.

== Operational commanders ==
- Commander Toyoaki Horiuchi: led the 1st Yokosuka SNLF (519 men in two waves) in the Menado operation.
- Lieutenant Commander Koichi Fukumi: led the 3rd Yokosuka SNLF (630 troops in two waves) in the West Timor campaign.

== See also ==
- 1st Airborne Brigade (Japan)
- Giretsu (special forces operations)
- Paramarines (special USMC airborne forces)
