= Imperial Japanese Army during the Pacific War =

Overview of Japanese army activity during WWII in the Pacific

Imperial Japanese Army
- The ensign of the Imperial Japanese Army
- Founded: 1867
- Disbanded: 1945
- Headquarters: Tokyo

Leadership
- Tennō: Shōwa-tennō (昭和天皇)
- Ministry of the Army 陸軍省, Rikugun-shō: Shunroku Hata; Hideki Tōjō; Hajime Sugiyama; Korechika Anami; Naruhiko Higashikuni; Sadamu Shimomura
- Chief of the General Staff 陸軍参謀総長, Rikugun Sanbō Sōchō: Kotohito Kan’in; Hajime Sugiyama; Hideki Tōjō; Yoshijirō Umezu

Personnel
- Conscription: 17–40

The Pacific War lasted from 1941 to 1945, with the Empire of Japan fighting against the United States, the British Empire and their allies. Most of the campaign was fought on a variety of small islands in the Pacific region. Ground fighting in the Pacific was characterized by its intense ferocity, and combat conditions were marked by illness and logistical difficulties, especially for Japanese soldiers. The Imperial Japanese Army (IJA) typically fought alone in these engagements, often with very little naval or aerial support, and the IJA quickly garnered a reputation for tenacious resistance as well as brutality.

At the beginning of the Pacific War in 1941, the Imperial Japanese Army contained 51 divisions, 27 of which were stationed in China. A further 13 divisions defended the Manchurian–Soviet border, due to concerns about a possible attack by the Soviet Union. From 1942 onwards, troops were sent to Hong Kong (23rd Army), the Philippines (14th Army), Thailand (15th Army), Burma (15th Army), the Dutch East Indies (16th Army), and Malaya (25th Army). A total of 5.473 million men served in the Imperial Japanese Army over the course of the war.

Japanese troops suffered from a shortage of supplies, especially food, medicine, munitions, and armaments, largely due to the crippling losses inflicted on Japan's merchant fleet by Allied submarines. Logistical issues were worsened by a longstanding rivalry with the Imperial Japanese Navy, with army and navy planners generally viewing support for the other as transactional instead of collaborative. As many as two-thirds of Japan's total military deaths were a result of illness or starvation.

== First offensive maneuvers (1941–1942) ==
Once the Pacific War began, the Imperial Japanese Army quickly captured many critical areas across the Pacific. These included British Malaya, Guam, the Philippines and Wake Island. A combination of Japanese naval supremacy, the Allied doctrine of"Europe first", and poor Allied defensive preparations meant the Japanese encountered relatively little opposition during this stage of the war. About 85% of American resources, including 68% of US Army personnel, went towards the European Theater in early 1942. The Japanese control of large parts of Oceania and Asia afforded them the strategic initiative, as these territories were rich in resources critical to the Japanese war economy, including rubber, tin, bauxite and oil. Japan lacked domestic oil reserves, but in 1942 the Dutch East Indies was the fourth largest global producer of oil.

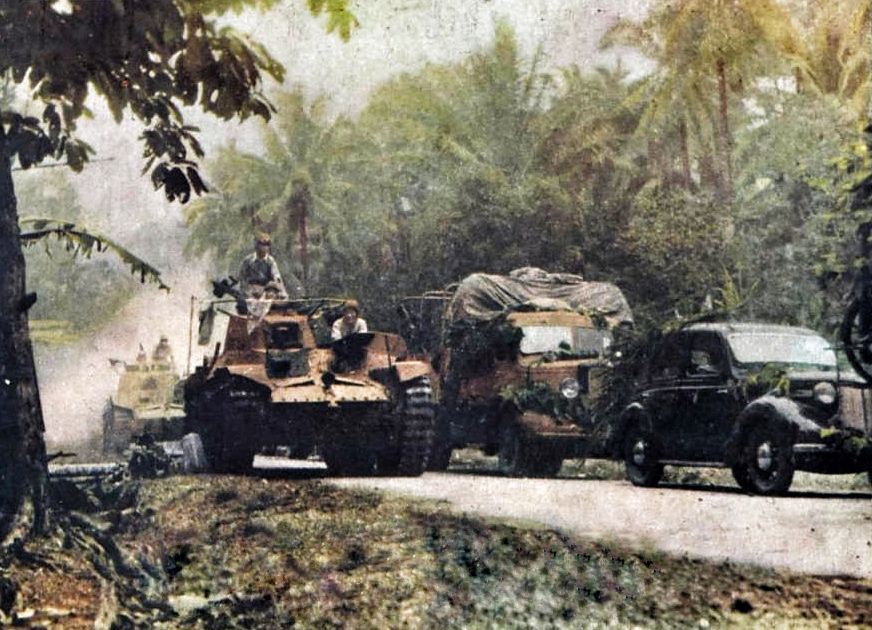
Japanese Chi-Ha tanks and trucks in Malaya, 1942.

== Loss of momentum (1942-1943) ==
Throughout late 1942 and early 1943, the Japanese offensive in New Guinea lost momentum during engagements with Australian and US forces at Milne Bay, along the Kokoda Track and around Buna–Gona. The most significant setback for the Imperial Japanese Army was the months-long Battle of Guadalcanal, a battle of attrition in which the Japanese lost over 25,000 men before abandoning the island in early 1943. Guadalcanal subsequently became one of the largest Allied naval and air bases in the south Pacific. The battle was the first major Allied victory on land in the Pacific Theater, and Guadalcanal would later be used as a staging ground for Allied attacks on the Palau Islands, Bougainville, and Guam.

After the defeat at Guadalcanal, the Japanese were largely forced onto the defensive. Throughout 1943, American forces engaged in an island hopping campaign against Japanese garrisons in the Pacific, adopted a strategy of unrestricted submarine warfare against the Japanese merchant fleet, and began to launch air raids on Japan that gradually destroyed Japan's war economy. Japan's industrial capacity was equivalent to only 10% of that of the United States. Japanese Vice Admiral Raizō Tanaka remarked, "There is no question that Japan's doom was sealed with the closing of the struggle for Guadalcanal."

During the island hopping campaign, American forces captured islands that were deemed strategically essential, and blockade those deemed unimportant, preventing Japanese troops from being resupplied or reinforced. A notable Japanese garrison that was "bypassed" by Allied forces was based on New Britain, where 69,000 Japanese soldiers and 20,000 civilian workers were trapped around Rabaul from late 1943 until the end of the war. The effectiveness of the island hopping strategy came from the fact that it generated significant results despite the limited Allied resources allocated to the Pacific theater, and that the Japanese were largely unable to reinforce isolated island strongholds. Most Japanese-held islands were garrisoned by less than a single division, because so many Japanese troops were dedicated to the China Burma India Theater.

As such, the Allies were able to quickly acquire naval and aerial supremacy over islands they chose to attack. During 1943 and early 1944, many Japanese island garrisons were overcome in less than a week of ground fighting. However, towards the end of the war, the Japanese defense of their island garrisons became more protracted, such as on Iwo Jima and Okinawa, two islands close to the Japanese mainland. The Battle of Peleliu in September 1944 had the highest casualty rate of any American amphibious invasion (40%), but American forces were still able to secure the island after several months. After the capture of Okinawa, Allied strategists planned an invasion of the Japanese mainland, codenamed Operation Downfall, the first stage of which would have been the invasion of Kyūshū island in November 1945.

In Manchuria, despite the impending catastrophe facing Japan on all fronts by mid-1944, the Kwantung Army commander, General Yamada, as well as his top leadership, continued to live "in a fool's paradise." Many of the elite Kwantung Army units had been sent to other theaters by 1945, hollowing out the combat effectiveness of Japanese forces in Manchuria. Even after the atomic bombing of Hiroshima on 6 August, there was no sense of crisis, and special war games (expected to last for five days and attended by a number of high-ranking officers) were conducted near the Soviet border, with Yamada flying to Dairen to dedicate a shrine. The Kwantung Army was taken by complete surprise when the Soviets launched their general offensive at midnight on August 8/9 1945, and swiftly overrun.

The Japanese offered vicious resistance to the Soviet advance when they were able to stand and fight, such as at Mutanchiang, Karafuto, and Shumshu but almost without exception they were overwhelmed and pushed back from the front. After just about a week of combat, reacting to the Soviet declaration of war and the second nuclear strike on Nagasaki, Hirohito overrode his military and ordered the surrender of Japan to the Allies in accordance with the Potsdam Declaration. After some clarifications and a second Imperial rescript reaffirming Japan's surrender, General Yamada and his staff abandoned a plan to withdraw to Tonghua, even though his command was still mostly intact.

The Kwantung Army officially laid down its arms on 17 August 1945, with some sporadic clashes persisting until the end of the month. (Note: Contrary to popular opinion, the Kwantung Army still possessed considerable fighting power.) By the end of the war the IJA had about 664,000 men in Manchuria and 294,200 in Korea. The USMC Official History noted that "Although the Kwantung Army reeled back from Soviet blows, most of its units were still intact and it was hardly ready to be counted out of the fight. The emperor's Imperial Rescript ordering Japanese troops to lay down their arms was the only thing which prevented a protracted and costly battle." The final casualties on both sides numbered 12,031 killed and 24,425 wounded for the Soviets and 21,389 killed and about 20,000 wounded for the Japanese. In the end, as Foreign Minister Shigemitsu signed the unconditional surrender of Japan aboard USS Missouri in Tokyo Bay, the men of the vaunted Kantogun, having once dreamed of driving into Siberia as conquerors, instead found themselves transported there as prisoners of war.

== Overarching goals ==
Japanese grand strategy involved expanding its borders and acquiring strategic war materials to offset Japan's lack of economic self-sufficiency, which was exacerbated by its lack of natural resources. Similar to the Nazi German concept of Lebensraum, the Japanese perceived the conquest of Asia and Oceania as a preordained, quasi-divine right. Japanese expansion was also motivated by Pan-Asianism, and a desire to remove American and European influence from the continent.

Furthermore, in response to the Great Depression, the United States passed the Smoot–Hawley Tariff Act, greatly increasing the price of exports, which Japan was reliant on. This furthered the Japanese idea that they needed to be able to survive economically without the help of other nations, prompting the invasion of Manchuria in 1931.

After the Attack on Pearl Harbor and the invasion of Malaya in December 1941, the Empire of Japan was officially at war with the United States and the British Empire. Japan recognized that it would not be able to win a protracted war with the Allied Powers, and Japanese strategists believed that such operations should take no longer than 150 days. They were expecting that Germany would be able to force a British surrender, and subsequently, the United States would be compelled to end the war on terms agreeable to Japanese interests.

== Leadership, Control, Organization ==
The official commander-in-chief of the Japanese army was the emperor. He determined its structure, declared war, made peace and concluded treaties. He was supported by two military councils: The Council of Marshals and Admirals (jap. 元帥府, Gensuifu) and the Supreme Military Council. (jap. 最高戦争指導会議, Saikō Sensō Shidō Kaigi) In times of war or serious emergencies, an imperial high command was established under the supervision of the emperor to support him in the exercise of his office. Subordinate to the emperor and the Imperial high command, the Imperial Japanese Army was managed by four main bodies. These were the General Staff, the War Ministry, the General Inspectorate of Military Training and the Inspectorate General of Aviation.

The General Staff (jap. 参謀本部 Sambō Hombu) comprised the five offices of General Affairs, Operations, Intelligence, Transportation and History. This body was in charge of drafting war plans, training and deploying the combined forces, directing major maneuvers, deploying troops, drafting field regulations, maps and military history, and supervising the General Staff School and the Land Survey Department. The Chief of the General Staff was appointed by the Emperor.

The Ministry of the Army (jap. 陸軍省 Rikugun-shō) was the administrative, supply and mobilization authority of the army. Its head, the Minister of War, was a member of the cabinet and the liaison between the army and parliament. He had to be a general or lieutenant general, and was directly subordinate to the emperor. The ministry was divided into a secretariat and eight offices. The General Inspectorate of Military Training consisted of an Office for General Affairs and several inspectorates. It was responsible for the technical and tactical training of the individual branches of the armed forces, with the exception of the Army Air Force and other services that were not subordinate to the ministry.

The General Aviation Inspectorate (jap. 陸軍航空総監部 Rikugun kōkū sōkanbu) was created by decree on December 7, 1938, to oversee the training of the aviation corps. It comprised a general affairs department and a training department and was headed by a general or lieutenant general. Only in matters of aviation training was it directly subordinate to the Kaiser; otherwise the Inspector General of Aviation was subordinate to the Chief of the General Staff, the Minister of War and the Inspector General of Military Training.

== Army organization ==
The Japanese army was divided into 6 army groups (jap. 総軍, sōgun), which in turn were divided into 21 regional armies (jap. 方面軍, hōmengun). The Chief of Staff of the Japanese Army was responsible for the general command of the armed forces in the field.

=== Field army ===
A Japanese field army was considered the equivalent of an American or British corps. It consisted of a high command, a variable number of infantry divisions and army troops. Such a force usually comprised between 50,000 and 150,000 men and was commanded by a general (jap. 陸軍中将, Rikugun-Taishō).

=== Division ===
In its basic form, the Japanese infantry division (jap. 歩兵師団, Fuyō Shidan) consisted of a division headquarters, a division reporting unit, an infantry group headquarters, three infantry regiments, an artillery regiment, a cavalry or reconnaissance regiment, an engineer regiment, a medical unit, a field hospital, a water treatment unit, a transport regiment, an ordnance unit and a veterinary unit. The standard infantry division consisted of 18,000 to 21,000 men, depending on its respective task.

The division was under the command of a lieutenant general, with a colonel of the general staff acting as chief of staff. The headquarters was divided into two divisions: the general staff division and the administrative division; five subdivisions as well as an ordnance division, a telecommunications division and a veterinary division were subordinate to the staff. The Chief of Staff was responsible for supervising and coordinating the work of the General Staff and the Administrative Staff and acted as a link between the division commander and the unit commanders, department heads and civilian authorities. All matters had to be submitted to the Chief of Staff before being handed over to the divisional commander, either by the division commanders or by the group or regimental commanders.

The administrative staff, together with the departments, consisted of around 175 officers and soldiers. The head of the department was a lieutenant colonel who handled all reports, except those relating to operations, and exercised general supervision over the administrative work. The division included a captain or lieutenant in charge of promotions, appointments, officers' and noncommissioned officers' personnel files, personnel, and administrative details of mobilization; a captain or lieutenant in charge of all matters relating to division services and responsible for administrative orders; and a captain or lieutenant in charge of documents and secretarial work of the division.

The division's signal unit, which was commanded by a captain, consisted of a command post, two signal platoons, a radio platoon and a material platoon. Its strength amounted to around 250 officers and soldiers. The company headquarters consisted of the commanding captain and around 20 subordinates. Each signal platoon was divided into four sections with a total strength of around 50 men. The command was held by a lieutenant. The radio platoon was divided into sections, each with one radio set. The number of sections varied between 8 and 12, with a total strength of around 100 to 125 men. The command was held by a first or second lieutenant. The equipment platoon was divided into two equipment sections with a total strength of 35 men.

The infantry group commanded by a major general consisted of a staff, an infantry group reporting unit (only in the reinforced divisions) and three infantry regiments. In some cases, armored companies with 80 to 120 men and 10 to 17 armored fighting vehicles were assigned to the infantry group. The staff, which consisted of 70 to 100 men, was divided into an administrative staff and a staff guard (equipped with automatic weapons).

=== Regiment, company and platoon ===
The infantry regiment (jap. 歩兵連隊, Hohei Rentai) comprised around 3,800 soldiers and over 700 horses. Throughout the war, the basic structure of the unit remained constant, although the internal organization of the subunits and the type and distribution of weapons carried by the garrison varied greatly. Medical support for the unit was modest, comprising two surgeons and two medics in the regimental administrative section, three surgeons and four medics in each battalion, and four medics in each company. Additional medical support was provided by the division.

The regiment's headquarters consisted of the staff, administration, code and intelligence sections, the orderly, intendant and light machine-gun sections as well as a color guard. The actual staff consisted only of the commander, the operations officer, the adjutant and the gas officer. It also included a 121-man regimental platoon with field and ammunition sections. The 40-man field division had 30 single-horse two-wheeled wagons or 40 packhorses. It carried the daily rations for the regimental companies as well as the supplies and equipment for the staff. A field kitchen could be attached. The 81-man ammunition section transported a day's supply of ammunition for the entire regiment in around 60 two-wheeled horse-drawn wagons or on 120 packhorses.

The three infantry battalions (jap. 歩兵大隊, Hohei Daitai) of around 1,100 men had a 30-man headquarters with a commander and an adjutant, an administration section, a code section, an intelligence section, an ordnance section, an intelligence section, a liaison section and a machine-gun section. The 110-man battalion platoon consisted of a 50-man field section and a 60-man ammunition section with horse-drawn wagons or packhorses. The battalion platoons were sometimes combined with the regimental platoon. Some regiments were supplemented by a work unit of 100-200 men, divided into six sections and an equipment section. This was by no means standard equipment. In most cases, the work detachments were formed from the infantry battalions or from external work detachments.

The four rifle companies (jap. 中隊, Chutai) with 180 men had a 19-man staff command with the commander, an administrative officer, a company sergeant responsible for personnel files, a material management sergeant, a weapons sergeant, four medics, an officer medic, a bugler and eight messengers. The three 54-man rifle platoons had a two-man staff with a platoon leader and a liaison sergeant. The latter was roughly equivalent to a US platoon sergeant and was primarily responsible for ensuring that orders were passed on to the detachments via weapon signals and messengers.

The three 13-man light machine gun sections were led by corporals. Each consisted of eight riflemen and a four-man machine-gun team: the latter consisted of a team leader, a machine-gunner and a second and third rifleman (ammunition carrier). All four shooters were armed with pistols, but in practice they often carried rifles. One rifleman usually carried a rifle grenade launcher. Sections assigned to reinforced units also had a two-man crew with a 5 cm grenade launcher.

The grenade launcher section was led by a private and consisted of six soldiers who also carried ammunition. The grenadiers were only armed with the grenade launcher and a bayonet, but some also carried rifles. Ten- to twelve-man detachments were also common. In battle, the grenade launcher section was usually integrated into the light machine gun section as its strength dwindled. Some battalions had only three rifle companies, although most had four at the beginning of the war. Although this was not common, some reinforced companies had a 46-man weapons platoon. This had two heavy machine guns and two 2 cm anti-tank rifles. When such a platoon was assigned, the weapons were reallocated from the battalion's machine gun company and infantry gun platoon, rather than the allocation being increased.

=== Artillery ===
The field artillery regiment with 2,322 men (野砲兵連隊, Yahohei Rentai) was commanded by a colonel or lieutenant colonel and had an adjutant and a staff of 14 men. The staff's task force, with a total strength of 104 men, included a reconnaissance platoon and a communications platoon. The regimental train, which was commanded by a captain or lieutenant, comprised 138 men, who were divided between three ammunition platoons and a field baggage train. Each battalion had a total strength of 688 officers and soldiers; each gun company (battery) comprised 183 men, while 58 men were responsible for each battalion platoon.

Each platoon was equipped with two 7.5 cm guns, which were operated by 19 men, resulting in a total of 36 howitzers per regiment. The regiment had around 2,000 horses at its disposal to transport the guns, ammunition and baggage. The mountain artillery regiment with 3,400 men (山砲兵連隊, Sampohei Rentai) was organized similarly to the field artillery regiment. It was equipped with 36 7.5 cm caliber mountain guns, which were transported by 1,400 draught and pack horses. Each mountain gun was operated by a crew of 24.

=== Armored Force ===
The primary operational unit of the armored force (装甲部隊, Sōkō Butai) was the tank regiment. It was the size of a battalion and consisted of 700 to 800 soldiers with around 80 tanks (30 light and 50 medium tanks). The unit consisted of a command staff, a company of light tanks, two companies of medium tanks and a train. The regiment was commanded by a colonel and each company by a captain. In order to lead several regiments, 4 tank groups were formed. (1st and 3rd Armored Groups 1938–1940 in Manchuria and the 2nd Armored Group 1941 in Japan) The group provided administrative and logistical support, but lacked adequate tactical command. To create a more effective organization, 4 armoured divisions were created between 1942 and 1944. Each division had two armored brigades, each with two regiments.

=== Cavalry ===
The division's 950-man cavalry regiment (騎兵連隊, Kihei Rentai) consisted of an 82-man regimental command and a regimental platoon with 3 companies. Each of these companies had three platoons, each armed with three light machine guns and two grenade launchers, as well as a machine gun platoon with two heavy machine guns. The machine gun company had two platoons, each equipped with two heavy machine guns and two 2 cm anti-tank rifles, as well as a platoon with two 3.7 cm anti-tank guns and an ammunition platoon. Although these regiments were equipped with around 1,100 horses, it was not uncommon for them to fight dismounted later in the war.

The 730-man reconnaissance regiment (捜索連隊, Subaku Rentai) was a cavalry unit that gradually replaced the cavalry regiment over the course of the war. It consisted of a 130-man regimental command and a regimental platoon, a mounted company, two motorized companies, a company with tankettes or armoured vehicles and a truck transport company. The mounted company of 130 men was divided into four platoons of 30 men each. Only a few regiments actually had a tankette or armored vehicle company. Such a company usually had seven tankettes or armored vehicles.

The motorized companies, each with 160 men, consisted of two platoons of 50 men each, which in their organization and armament essentially corresponded to an infantry platoon, a 24-man machine gun platoon with two heavy machine guns and a 24-man anti-tank platoon with two 3.7 cm anti-tank guns. However, many units did not have these anti-tank guns. On paper, the 100-man truck transport company had two platoons, one of which transported a motorized company

=== Pioneers and transportation ===
The 900 to 1,000-man pioneer regiment (工兵連隊, Kohei Rentai) consisted of a 100-man regimental command and a regimental platoon as well as a material platoon with 50-100 soldiers. The three pioneer companies each had about 250 men, organized into four platoons of 50 men each and a 25-man material section. The material section had trucks and some motorized engineer equipment. Each platoon was divided into four sections.

As a rule, one pioneer company was assigned to each infantry regiment to carry out basic tasks such as clearing obstacles, light road repairs, building foot bridges and other smaller jobs. Pioneer regiments that were not part of a division were organized at the army level and assigned to divisional units for more specialized pioneering tasks. The transport regiment (輜重兵連隊, Shichohei Rentai) depended heavily on the availability of trucks for its organization. Ideally, it consisted of a truck transport battalion and a platoon battalion.

The truck battalion consisted of two to three companies, each with up to 50 trucks, each with a capacity of 1.5 tons. However, in many cases, the units had fewer vehicles or only confiscated vehicles at their disposal. The draft battalion consisted of three to four companies, each comprising about 240 two-wheeled, single-horse carts and 350 soldiers. Many regiments did not have a strict battalion structure but instead had up to eight draft companies and a small veterinary unit. A regiment with eight companies had limited cross-country mobility and typically distributed its tasks as follows: four companies for food and forage, two for artillery ammunition, and one for small arms ammunition. In some units, draft companies were replaced by packhorse companies, with two packhorse companies replacing one draft company. These companies had 300 packhorses and 450 soldiers. About one-third of the soldiers were armed.

=== Medical Service ===
The division's medical service, under the command of a colonel, was responsible for treating wounded soldiers in the forward areas on a considerable scale. Its purpose was both to return the wounded to service more quickly and to reduce the need for evacuations. The medical department was part of the division staff. The medical unit, commanded by a colonel or lieutenant colonel, included a staff of 265 personnel. The unit was responsible for providing specialized medical, dental, and pharmaceutical services and had three treatment platoons, three bearer companies, and one ambulance company. One bearer company, one treatment platoon, and one ambulance platoon were each assigned to an infantry regiment.

The task of the field hospitals was to collect, treat, and evacuate wounded soldiers. The three or four field hospitals (1st to 4th in each division), each with a capacity for 500 patients, were equipped with a medical company responsible for running the hospital, performing surgeries, and treating the sick and wounded. Each field hospital also included a transport company responsible for moving equipment, supplies, and personnel, as well as setting up tents for the hospital. Each field hospital also had a large water supply and purification unit, which was tasked with cleaning and distributing water supplies and performing various preventive medical and field hygiene tasks.

Medical corps Private First Class in the Imperial Guard first regiment, Yoshiro Yamazaki admitted Japan only controlled "points and lines" in the "occupied" areas in north-central China and Japanese suffered from subhuman medical care, with a drug addict Japanese doctor running a hospital along the Yellow river and his patients suffering from diarrhea and dehydration. The Japanese suffered severe frostbite. He personally cut the hand off a dead Japanese officer to take the hand back as remains and he was terrified of a Chinese mortar bombardment during a Chinese attack that almost wiped the Japanese out, where the Japanese suffered huge casualties. he saw a P-51 killed First Lieutenant Hakua Akiyama.

== Statistics ==
Distribution of Japanese Army personnel, August 1945
Location	Number
Japanese mainland	2,388,000
Kurile islands, Sakhalin	88,000
Taiwan, South-West Islands	169,000
Korean peninsula	294,000
Manchukuo	664,000
China and Hong Kong	1,056,000
Southern and mid-Pacific region	744,000
Rabaul region	70,000
Total	5,473,000

There were 2.3 million military deaths, of whom 1.4 million died away from the battlefield, succumbing to disease and starvation.

== Conscription and recruitment ==
All Japanese males between the ages of 17 and 40 were liable for military service. At the age of 17, men reported to their local police station and gave their place of origin (jap. 本籍, honseki), i.e. the house of their parents, where they probably still lived. When a person moved away, they had to indicate their current place of residence (jap. 現住所, genjisho). The main Japanese islands were divided into 14 divisional districts. Korea was divided into two districts and Taiwan formed a separate district. Each divisional district was divided into two to five regimental conscription districts. The regimental district in which a person's honseki was located was his reporting station when he was called into the Emperor's service by the Troops Office (jap. 兵務局, Heimu Kyoku).

There were only a few deferments, mainly for students who could defer their service until the age of 26, depending on the type of training, and for those who could prove that their service would be a family burden. The deferment was renewable at two-year intervals. Criminals and the physically and mentally disabled were excluded from service. Men could volunteer between the ages of 17 and 20, and there was a training program for young men who wanted to learn technical skills before being drafted. Koreans could volunteer from 1938 and Taiwanese from 1942. Those living overseas could postpone their enlistment for one year at a time, provided they did not return to Japan for at least 90 days. This also applied to colonists living on the Japanese Mandate Islands (Mariana Islands, Marshalls, Caroline Islands).

Young men who would turn 20 between August 1 and December 2 reported for conscription between April 16 and July 31 before their birthday. If their birthday was after December 2, they reported between April 16 and July 31 after their birthday. In 1943, the registration age was lowered to 19. Koreans could be drafted from 1944 and Taiwanese from 1945. Both had been conscripted as unarmed laborers without military training since 1942. (Korea and Taiwan had been Japanese possessions since 1910 and 1895 respectively).

Those who were available for active service (jap. 現役, geneki) were divided into two categories: Class A - 1.52 m tall and in good physical condition, and Class B-1 - 1.50 m tall and in slightly poorer physical condition (mainly slight vision or hearing problems). Conscripts in classes B-2 and B-3 were the same as those in class B-1, but had even poorer eyesight and hearing. They were assigned to the conscript reserve (jap. 徴兵予備軍, Chouhei Jobigun) and could be called up for reserve training for a maximum of 180 days over the next 17 years and 4 months. Eye, ear and dental problems were common due to the often vitamin-deficient diet. During the war, many of these reservists were called up for active service. Those who were classified as Class C due to their poor physical condition, were between 1.45 m and 1.5 m tall and did not suffer from a disabling illness, were assigned to the Second National Army until the age of 40. Class D, i.e. persons with a height of less than 1.45 m or with certain incurable diseases, was excluded. Class F was for those with temporary ailments who were re-examined annually.

In October 1942, deferment for students was abolished, with the exception of students in certain medical and scientific disciplines. Highly qualified factory technicians were also exempt. In December 1943, the draft age was lowered to 19 and in June 1944 to 18, extending the period of active service to three years - although this was not intended to last the duration of the war. Men were now required to serve until the age of 45. Japanese who resided in the occupied territories (Philippines, Dutch East Indies, French Indochina, etc.) and whose entry examination had been deferred also became liable for service.

Regular army officers either came from the military academy or were graduates of technical and scientific institutions. Most of them were selected while still at school and educated at state expense at certain universities and colleges with prescribed curricula. University graduates received their commission as first lieutenants. Selected officer candidates and non-commissioned officers in active service who were younger than 38 years old became officer candidates (jap. 少尉候補者, Shōi Kōhosha) and received one-year courses at the military academy. In peacetime, they usually did not rise above the rank of captain, as they were retired for reasons of age.

The reserve officers were mainly made up of Class A reserve officer candidates (jap. 甲種幹部候補生, Kōshu Kambu Kōhosei) who had completed the required training course. They were selected from regular conscripts who had certain educational qualifications. After three months of training in their unit, they were appointed candidates, and after another three months they were divided by examination into "A" candidates, who were suitable for officers, and "B" candidates, who were suitable for non-commissioned officers. The "A" candidates were then sent to one of the regular courses for reserve officer candidates. After receiving an officer's commission in peacetime, they were usually transferred to the reserve, from which they could be called up for active service in wartime. These reserve officers recalled to active duty (jap. 少尉将校, Shōdshu Shōkō) made up a large proportion of Japan's wartime officers.

== Training ==
Japanese boys who attended 3rd grade received semi-military training from their teachers. Those who went on to middle school, high school, college or university received military training under regular army officers. In peacetime, this amounted to 2 or more hours per week with 4 to 6 days of annual maneuvers. During the war, the amount of time spent on military subjects was greatly increased. Those who took up employment after completing elementary school received extensive military training in youth schools (jap. 青年学校, Seinen Gakkō) set up especially for them by the government. Aviation training, especially in the handling of gliders, was also given high priority. Numerous courses of a purely military nature were included in the curriculum to turn secondary schools into training camps for cadets and universities and high schools into military academies for reservists.

=== Enlisted men ===
In peacetime, the training of men assigned to active service (classes A and B-1) extended over a period of 2 years. Conscripts often received the majority of their training in operational areas. The Chinese war zone was used for training purposes, where the men had to perform garrison duties and sometimes gained real combat experience during their training period. Regardless of whether he received his training in a replacement or field unit, the conscript was assigned to a training unit within a company. This consisted of 20-30 recruits and was divided into two sections (buntai). The number of training units in a company was not fixed; it depended on the strength of the company and the available non-commissioned officers.

The units were trained, fed and quartered together. Only when a company was sent into the field was it divided into three platoons (jap. 小隊, shotai), which usually consisted of three light machine gun sections and one grenade launcher section and were commanded by a lieutenant. During training, the recruits rarely saw officers, only during the frequent readings of the imperial reception for soldiers and sailors and during inspections. Throughout training, special attention was paid to "morale" or spiritual instruction.

The "Imperial Rescript for Soldiers" issued by the Meiji-Tennō on 4 January 1882 was frequently read to the men, and the five principles of military ethics contained therein - loyalty, courtesy, courage, truthfulness and frugality - were particularly emphasized. The reservists of the first and second conscription had to complete six months of training. The training was not as intensive as that of the active soldiers, but nevertheless attempted to teach everything that the active soldiers had learned in their two-year course in a comparatively shorter time.

=== Officers ===
The vast majority of regular officers who attained the rank of staff officer were graduates of the military academy, carefully selected from the graduates of the three-year courses at one of the military preparatory schools (jap. 陸軍幼年学校, Rikugun Yōnen Gakkō) in Tokyo, Osaka, Nagoya, Hiroshima, Sendai and Kumamoto, as well as from other applicants who had the appropriate physical and educational qualifications. Those who met the criteria for enlistment were eligible to apply, including non-commissioned officers under the age of 25 and privates under the age of 22 or applicants between the ages of 16 and 18.

Prior to the Second World War, cadet training in peacetime consisted of two years at the Junior Military Academy (jap. 陸軍予科士官学校 Rikugun Yoka Shikan Gakkō) in Asaka, followed by eight months of service with the troops in a particular branch of service. After that, the candidates completed another year and eight months of training at the military academy in Zama, or, in the case of aviation officers, at the aviation academy in Tokyo. The curriculum at the military academy focused primarily on general military subjects and practical training in the department to which the cadet was assigned. In addition, there were one-year courses for special volunteer officers and officer candidates aiming for an officer's commission.

The courses at the General Staff School (jap. 陸軍大学校, Rikugun Daigakkō) in Tokyo were usually open to captains who had been in the service for less than eight years and had at least one year of field experience. In wartime, however, these courses were extended to officers of units in combat zones, regardless of age or rank. In peacetime, the institution offered a three-year standard course for command and staff work, a one-year version of the regular course, and a four-month specialized course for work on the aviation general staff.

After at least six months of training in units, Class A reserve officer candidates received training specifically tailored to their needs. Depending on their specialty, they were trained at various reserve officer schools: Infantrymen in Morioka or Kumamoto, for example, artillerymen in Toyohashi and transport officers in Kurume. For specialized areas such as cavalry, engineering or medicine, courses were held at the relevant technical schools. The training usually lasted just under a year, but in some cases could be shortened to six months. It combined theoretical knowledge, such as the development of regulations and tactics, with practical exercises which, despite their simple level, were designed to be very realistic. After successful completion, the candidates completed a probationary period of around four months in units before being appointed officers.

NCO training took place at specialized schools in Sendai, Kumamoto, Toyohashi, and Kungchuling, which mostly focused on infantry. However, some schools, such as those in Toyohashi, also offered courses in artillery or cavalry. For technical subjects such as engineering, intelligence or weapons maintenance, candidates were trained at schools in the relevant branches of the army. In addition, there were specialized courses at institutions such as the Armoured School, the Military Police School or the Military Medical School. These courses often provided technical knowledge necessary for the particular use.

== Promotion ==
A recruit who joined the army was usually automatically promoted to Private first class (jap. 一等兵, Ittōhei) after 6 months. According to the regulations, the minimum time for promotion from Private to lance corporal (jap. 上等兵, Jōtōhei) was one year and from lance corporal to corporal (jap. 伍長, Gochō) was 6 months; however, qualified lance corporals were promoted to corporal in less than 6 months. Privates could be promoted to the various ranks of non-commissioned officer and officer without completing the course at a non-commissioned officer school, provided they had the necessary qualifications. The minimum periods within which promotion to a higher rank was possible after assuming the previous lower rank were set by imperial decree as follows. Sergeant (jap. 軍曹, Gunsō), after 1 year as a corporal. First sergeant (jap. 二等軍曹 Nitō-Gunsō), after 2 years as a sergeant. To sergeant major (jap. 曹長, Sōchō) after 4 years as first sergeant. All promotions of NCOs were by recommendation and selection, and in wartime the promotion process was greatly accelerated depending on the needs of the situation. Men who had attended courses at NCO schools could be promoted more quickly than those who had not.

Minimum periods of service in a rank were also stipulated for officers before they could be promoted. However, according to an imperial decree issued in March 1941, both officers and enlisted men could be promoted by two ranks for particularly meritorious service in the field, outstanding performance in military affairs, leaving the service due to injury or illness, or posthumously for those who had been killed in action. As a rule, junior officers (jap. 尉官, Ikan) had to serve three years in the troops before being promoted to staff officer (jap. 佐官, Sakan) and staff officers had to serve two years before being promoted to flag officer (jap. 佐官, Shōkan). Exceptions to this rule were made in times of war. Flag officers were appointed by the Emperor from lists of eligible officers submitted by the Minister of War. The other officers were appointed by the Minister of War with the approval of the Emperor. The commanders of independent units could, in certain cases, be specially entrusted with the authority to decide on promotions .

== Equipment ==
=== Rifles and small arms ===
The standard Japanese pistol was the 8 mm Nambu Type 14 and 94, both of which were semi-automatic recoil-operated pistols. The service rifle of the Japanese army was the Arisaka Type 38, which was replaced by the Arisaka Type 99 from 1939. While both had the same range of around 4000 metres, the former fired 6.5 mm ammunition and the latter 7.7 mm ammunition. A shorter version of the Type 38 was the Type 38 cavalry carbine. This was almost 2 lbs lighter, but had a shorter range and lower muzzle velocity due to its 19 in barrel. A later model of the cavalry carbine was the Type 44, which had a short barrel but was considerably heavier and had a fixed short bayonet with a point. The bayonet could be retracted when not needed and immediately extended by pressing a push button.

=== Machine guns ===
The Model 11 (1922) 6.5 mm light machine gun was part of the standard equipment of Japanese infantry units. As a light machine gun it was used on a bipod mount; as an anti-aircraft gun it was occasionally mounted on a tripod. The Japanese also made extensive use of the 7.7 mm Type 92 (1932) machine gun. The Japanese Type 96 (1936) light machine gun with a calibre of 6.5 mm was very similar to the British .303 calibre Bren light machine gun. In its design, however, it had some features of French and Czech automatic weapons.

The most commonly used Japanese heavy machine gun was a modified 7.7 mm Hotchkiss model, also designated Type 92 (1932). It was usually mounted on a tripod and could also be used for air defence. The largest machine gun was the 13 mm Type 93 (1933), which was used for both anti-aircraft and ground fire . The only submachine gun in service in the Japanese Empire was the Type 100. It fired the 8x22mm Nambu round, which had only half the muzzle velocity of the 9×19mm Parabellum used by Britain and Germany. The Type 100 was modelled after the German MP-18, and only a few thousand were built, compared to the 1.75 million Thompsons, the SMG in use in the United States.

=== Grenades ===
All Japanese front-line troops were equipped with the Type 97 (1937) hand grenade. It had a black, serrated cast-iron body and a brass fuse and was loaded with TNT. The time delay was 4 to 5 seconds. Another widely used grenade was the Type 91 (1931), which could also be fired from 50 mm Model 10 and 90 rocket launchers. It could also be used as a rifle grenade. The Japanese also used the stick grenade. This grenade was either highly explosive or fitted with phosphorus-impregnated rubber pellets, which were scattered by a small explosive charge. A hydrogen cyanide gas grenade was also used .

=== Artillery ===
Between 1925 and 1936, the Japanese artillery was considerably improved and modernised with the introduction of new models. No further models were introduced until the Second World War. The earlier Japanese artillery guns were based on German Krupp designs, while the new models were based on the French Schneider models. Although they could be towed by vehicles, the Japanese mostly used horses.

The standard gun was the 7.5 cm Type 38 (1905). This gun was an improvement on the original Type 38 model, which had been introduced in 1915. Changes included a longer barrel trunnion, which was mounted further back on the gun and allowed for greater elevation. The barrel was also fitted with improved levelling devices to compensate for the increased length, as well as a variable recoil system and an open box barrel to further improve elevation. Despite these improvements, the weapon remained obsolete and only partially suitable for its intended purpose. Its maximum range was 10,400 metres and it was capable of firing 10-12 rounds per minute for short periods.

The 7.5 cm Type 95 (1935) gun, a replacement for the Type 38, offered a number of design improvements and a split barrel, but was only used to a limited extent during the war. The 7.5 cm Type 90 (1930) gun was even less widespread. Its advanced design with pneumatic tyres for towing made it a preferred choice for specialised units such as independent artillery regiments and tank units. A variant with spoked wheels was issued to divisional artillery regiments and offered a versatile solution for different operational needs. The 7.5 cm Type 90's longer barrel, muzzle brake and long firing ranges contributed to its high muzzle velocity and effective performance against armoured targets.

Many divisional artillery regiments were equipped with the 7.5 cm Type 94 (1934) mountain gun. It could be disassembled into 11 components to load six panniers. Although it used the same ammunition as other 7.5 cm guns, its range was only 9,000 metres. The 10 cm Type 91 (1931) howitzer was used in both divisional and independent artillery regiments. The weapon could fire explosive, armour-piercing, shrapnel and phosphorus shells up to a range of 11,500 m at a rate of six to eight rounds per minute. The medium artillery regiments were equipped with the 10 cm Type 92 gun (1932). This weapon was known for its comparatively long range, which made it difficult to detect in hidden jungle positions.

=== Tanks and armoured vehicles ===
The Japanese tanks, most of which were designed in the mid-1930s, were inferior to the Western models encountered at the beginning of the war. They were mostly used for reconnaissance and supply purposes as they were ineffective in direct combat against other tanks. Most light tanks weighed close to 8 tonnes and could carry a crew of three. The armament of the light tanks included a 37-mm 47-mm or 57-mm cannon as the main armament and a 7.7-mm machine gun. The general characteristics of the Japanese medium tanks were a weight of 15 tonnes, a length of 5.50 m, a width of 22 m and a height of almost 2.40 m.

They had a crew of four. They had a crew of four men and were armoured to varying degrees. The armour was up to 26 mm thick on the front and sides of the hull, but rarely more than 9 mm on the underside. Early models had a 57 mm cannon, which was replaced by a 47 mm cannon on later models, and carried two 7.7 mm machine guns as secondary armament. They could carry 120 rounds of 47-mm ammunition and up to 4,000 rounds of 7.7-mm machine gun ammunition. The speed of the later medium tanks did not differ significantly from that of the earlier versions and was around 25 mph. The Japanese had three models of tankettes weighing between 3 and 4.2 tonnes. The maximum speeds were between 25 and 28 mph. They carried either a 37 mm cannon with a 7.7 mm machine gun as secondary armament or had a 6.5 mm machine gun.

Neither the light Type 95 Ha-Go nor the medium Type 97 Chi-Ha could penetrate an M4 Sherman frontally. Furthermore, while the United States Marines deployed twelve M3 half-tracks per battalion, while these vehicles were originally designed as tank destroyers, in the Pacific they were predominantly used as artillery, since Japanese tanks were so infrequently encountered. American light tanks such as the M5 Stuart and medium M3 Lee, while considered inadequate in Europe, were deployed in the Pacific, as they were sufficient in dealing with the Japanese.

== Tactics ==
Japanese tactical doctrine was based on offensive action, surprise and rapid movement, with all commanders and staff operating at the forefront of an advance to keep themselves constantly informed of the situation. The Japanese attempted to exploit the element of surprise at every opportunity, even if it meant sacrificing proper reconnaissance. Japanese units therefore often attacked superior forces, partly to gain confidence and partly because they believed that a superior force could be thrown into disarray by unexpected assault. Japanese field service regulations and other textbooks continually emphasized the value of constant offensive action. The Japanese military assumed that the Japanese, in close combat, would be superior to enemy troops with both rifle and bayonet.

Whenever possible, the Japanese tried to encircle their opponents. The Japanese frequently advanced in two columns, one of them along the enemy flank. Another column would attack the enemy head-on, pinning them in place and preventing retreat. The flanking column would then try to make its way to the rear, and was occasionally stronger than the column carrying out the frontal attack. Another maneuver was to simply advance until resistance was encountered. While the main offensive appeared to the enemy to be concentrated at one point, large bodies of troops were detached from the main Japanese front (which may have been outnumbered), and these detached units began an encircling movement that sometimes took the form of a double pincer. When a force was in danger of being overwhelmed, a suicide attack often occurred, with the Japanese charging the enemy with bayonets while shouting (Jap. 万歳, banzai).

Towards the end of the war, the IJA gradually abandoned its inherently offensive posture. Banzai charges became less frequent due to their ineffectiveness, as Allied troops possessed sufficient firepower and training to repulse them. Japanese garrisons on Peleliu and Okinawa abstained from banzai charges, preferring to fight a protracted campaign of attrition from defensive fortifications. During the Battle of Iwo Jima, General Tadamichi Kuribayashi prohibited banzai charges, as he believed they were a waste of manpower.

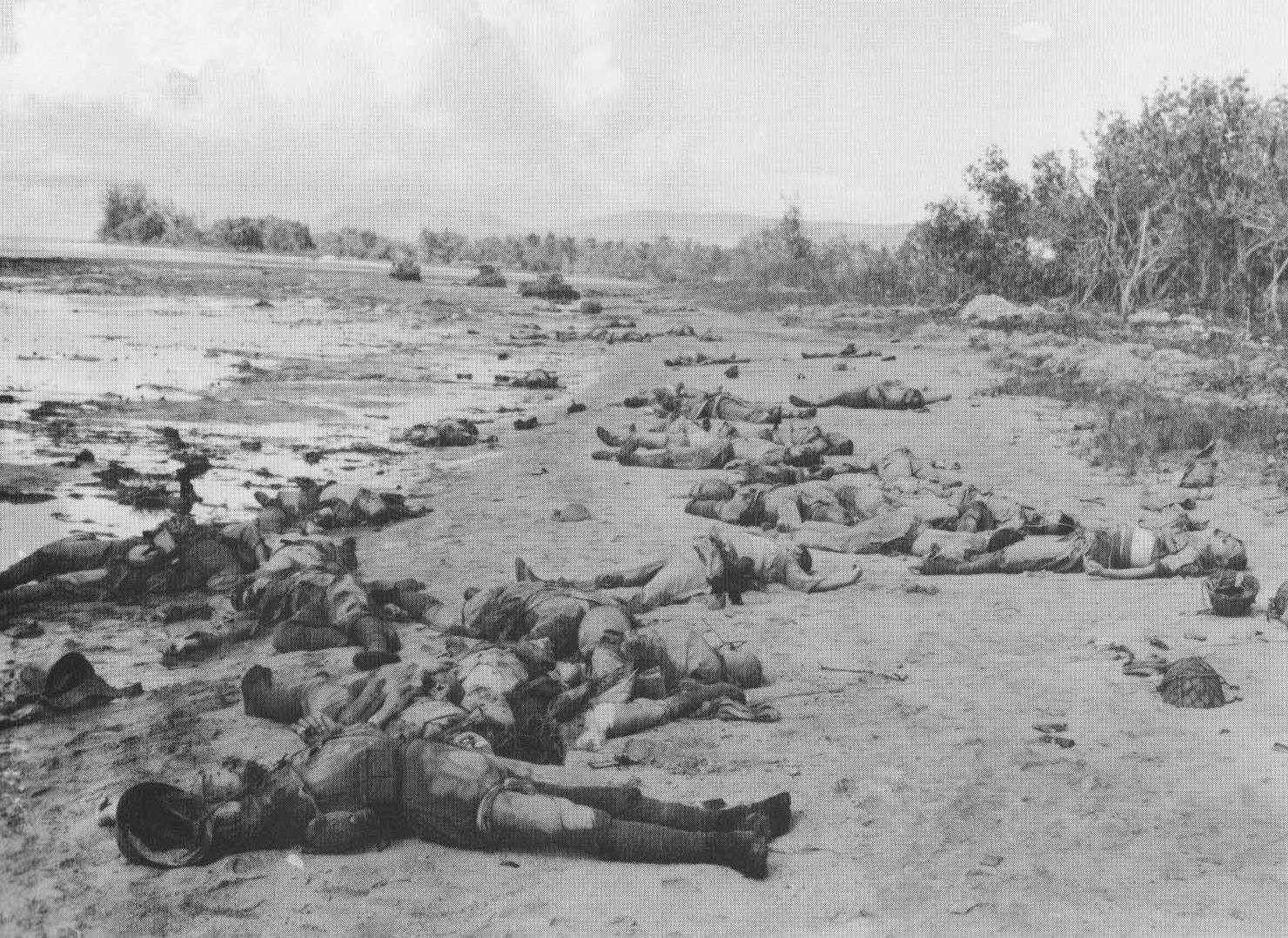
Dead Japanese soldiers lie on the beach after a failed banzai charge on Guadalcanal, 1942.

American propaganda distributed through leaflet drops accounted for about 20% of surrenders, equating to about one POW for every 6,000 leaflets dropped. Most Japanese objected to the "unscrupulous" leaflets, which claimed that American forces would be willing to accept surrenders from the Japanese. Japanese soldiers frequently committed suicide rather than surrender, motivated by a combination of bushido, which was enforced through propaganda, as well as reports that American soldiers would mutilate dead Japanese, sometimes taking their teeth and skulls as war trophies.

Although the Japanese army largely rejected defensive tactics until the end of the war, and never formally embraced defense as a core part of its doctrine, it had a formal defensive order that provided for zones of automatic fire and anti-tank obstacles. Defensive fire was generally staggered to create a ring-shaped firing pattern. Nevertheless, defensive fire was so unpopular that soldiers tended to jump out of their positions and attack the approaching enemy with bayonets. In the rarest of cases, this only created a temporary battlefield advantage. In the later stages of the war, when the army held island positions, Japanese soldiers frequently waited until the last possible moment before resorting to bayonets or grenades. On Okinawa, as in many other places, their discipline and determination were such that the Americans cautiously approached the foxholes with flamethrowers; even then, some Japanese soldiers remained in their positions.

== Living conditions ==
To a certain extent, Japanese recruits were better prepared for barracks life than recruits of other nationalities: conformity, subordination to authority and close living conditions were integral parts of their everyday lives, and the barracks hierarchy went beyond the boundaries of mere rank. A multi-layered hierarchy developed within the barracks, in which recruits were placed higher or lower than their comrades depending on their length of service. The recruits were systematically physically and psychologically abused in the barracks. They had to endure humiliating rituals and brutal ‘games’, which were staged by both older soldiers and superiors as entertainment or punishment.

Physical violence, humiliation and harsh punishments were commonplace, although such acts were officially forbidden. However, the officers tolerated this abuse and the recruits could hardly escape the violence. Despite the treatment, the Japanese soldiers were extremely loyal to their unit. The unit was their family, the platoon and company an extended family and the regiment the clan. The world of the army was an extension of traditional Japanese society, conformity and clan loyalty. This structure was reinforced when Japanese units were recruited on a regional basis. Divisions, designated by number, were often informally known by the name of the prefecture of their home depot.

=== Food supply ===
The Japanese Army Supply Department, which was roughly equivalent to the US Army Quartermaster Corps, was responsible for the procurement, storage and distribution of food, clothing and other supplies, with the exception of material issued by the Ordnance Department. In 1942, the Supply Division had 2,700 officers, including 20 generals and 630 staff officers. The department was divided into four sections, each dealing with food, clothing and other personal equipment, pay and accommodation. The staple of Japanese field rations was rice. The rice, which was boiled dry into a sticky mass to make it easier to eat with chopsticks, was either polished or unpolished. Polished rice was normally used as it kept longer when cooked.

To protect against beri beri, some barley may have been added to the rice, but this mixture was not overly popular. Instead, the rice was usually cooked with some pickled plums, which not only protected against beri beri but also acted as a laxative to counteract the constipating effect of rice. To make the rice more flavourful, it was usually seasoned with soy sauce or the corresponding powder (miso). Both soya sauce and miso were made from soya bean seeds to which malt and salt were added. Other popular foods were pickled radishes and dried, preserved or pickled octopus.

Preserved poultry included dried and pressed fish - salmon or bonito, which had to be soaked and salted to make them palatable; pickled plums, pressed barley or rice cakes, tinned oranges and mandarins, and powdered tea leaves. Dried vegetables, especially beans, peas, cabbage, horseradish, ginger slices, salted plum cake, tinned beef, tinned cooked whale meat, sweets and vitamin tablets were often included in the rations.

Rations were, however, not standardised and usually varied between 2 ½ and 4 pounds per day for the standard field ration. The ration was calculated in two forms, the normal (fresh) and the special (preserved), depending on the availability of fresh food. Quantities were also graded according to three output categories: the basic or full output, which was issued when transport was sufficient; the output when transport was difficult; and the third and least amount, which was issued when transport was very difficult.

There were two emergency rations. The ‘A’ ration consisted of about 1.8 pounds of rice, 5 oz of tinned fish or meat and a little miso and sugar. The ‘B’ ration consisted of hard biscuits in three muslin bags; each bag contained half a pound of biscuits for one meal. This ration could only be consumed on the orders of an officer. There was also a compressed ration for emergencies. It consisted of a cellophane packet containing boiled rice, pickled plums, dried fish, salt and sugar.

During the course of the war the US Navy focused on attacking freighters, tankers and transports, which caused an escalating food shortage. The soldiers lost weight and stamina. On Guadalcanal, the few draft animals were eaten and fuel ran out, boots wore out, carts broke down. The soldiers carried or pulled heavy loads through the jungle, using up energy as their body weight declined. Units on bypassed islands refused to surrender, and they suffered malnutrition, which made diseases like malaria more fatal. Medicine ran out. In Japanese units in Eastern New Guinea in 1943, after 6 weeks symptoms of malaria began to appear and spread steadily. After 5 to 6 months, only one-seventh of the soldiers were still healthy.

== Uniforms ==
The uniforms introduced by the Japanese Army in 1938 featured a distinctive turn-down collar, which was sometimes worn open in summer or tropical regions. Non-commissioned officers and enlisted men wore single-breasted jackets with five buttons and four flap pockets, with the two chest pockets having buttoned flaps, and breeches-style trousers fastened at the waist and ankles with straps. All troops, except for cavalry (who had leather boots), wore wool gaiters and high shoes made from untreated pig or cow leather, with either a nailed leather sole or a rubber sole with rubber studs. Tabi socks were issued for all climates. The caps were made of wool, featured a chin strap, and had a gold star on the front. For winter, coats and trousers made of olive-green wool were used, while in summer, these garments were replaced with khaki cotton twill coats and trousers of the same cut, with later issues of the cotton twill uniforms appearing more greenish than brown.

Imperial Japanese Army uniform between 1941 and 1945 (US Army poster)

The coat was characterized by a single-breasted design, complemented by two side welt pockets and a buttoned hood with a throat strap closure. Some double-breasted coats could also be worn by other troops, but (with the exception of the Imperial Guard Cavalry), the coats and vests of all non-commissioned officers and enlisted men were distinguished by a loop buttoned over the belt on the left side to support the weight of the bayonet and scabbard. This design was intended to improve mobility while marching and reduce wear on the coat.

The raincoat was similar to the coat and had a greenish-khaki color. However, officer uniforms were not workwear, and there were significant differences in quality, color, and cut. Generally, officers’ uniform coats were merely adaptations of the older coat, with a turn-down collar sewn onto the old stand-up collar. The double-breasted version of officers’ coats was further emphasized by elaborate belts and a designed slit on the left side for a sword. The distinction between captains, staff officers, and flag officers was marked by the number of broad fabric bands on the cuffs: one band for captains, two for staff officers, and three for flag officers. Senior and master sergeants were distinguished by a medium-sized band on the cuffs, while the remaining non-commissioned officers wore a narrow fabric band on the coat.

Instead of raincoats, officers wore rain capes with hoods and collar closures. Officers wore black leather shoes with gaiters or riding boots. Officers and officer cadets almost always carried swords. A variety of specialized clothing types were issued for different climates and regions. The development and large-scale issuance of winter clothing began as early as 1932 with the occupation of Manchuria. Winter clothing included heavily padded caps and coats. These coats were notable for their detachable sleeves, which could be quickly removed at the shoulder or elbow, allowing the proper sleeve length to be adjusted without altering the coat. Other common winter gear included fur leggings, mittens, wool underwear, padded fatigue trousers and jackets, and felt boots.

The standard summer uniforms made of cotton also proved suitable for tropical areas, as the material was heavy enough to provide protection against mosquitoes and withstand reasonable wear and tear. However, the summer coat was modified and equipped with flaps under the armpits that could be buttoned open or closed. Newer coats also had open seams under the armpits to improve ventilation during marches. Beneath the coat, a cotton twill shirt with a reinforced collar was worn, which could also be worn without the coat. The trousers were issued with shortened lower legs and a drawstring, so they could be securely worn with gaiters. When possible, the trousers were left open to provide cooling.

== Imperial Japanese Army Air Service ==
During World War II, Japan did not have an independent air force. The Japanese Army Air Force (大日本帝國陸軍航空部隊, Dainippon Teikoku Rikugun Kōkūbutai) was part of the Army. The Japanese Army Air Force was organized into five air armies (航空軍, Kōkū Gun), each with clearly defined areas of responsibility and functioning as administrative headquarters for their tactical units. The largest tactical unit was an air division (飛行師団, Hikō Shidan) which exercised both operational and administrative control over its subordinate air units. Below the air division was the air brigade (飛行団, Hikōdan), with each air division typically commanding two or more air brigades. The next lower unit was the air regiment (飛行連隊, Hikō Rentai), which was the fundamental operational unit. An air regiment consisted of three or more squadrons (飛行中, Hikō Chutai). The actual strength or combat capabilities of an air regiment depended on the type of aircraft assigned to the unit. A typical squadron consisted of 9 aircraft, divided into 3 sections with 3 aircraft each.

=== Training Program ===
Recruits underwent a training program lasting 16 to 24 months. The preparatory basic training for recruits varied depending on their age. Recruits of conscription age and men transferred from other branches of service attended a two-month course. This course provided a general introduction to aviation routines. Younger recruits, on the other hand, completed a 12-month program that included training in natural and social sciences. Physical fitness was also a significant part of the curriculum, although not all graduates were selected for pilot training.

The basic flight training, conducted at specialized flight schools, lasted a total of eight months. During the first six months, all prospective pilots underwent common training, regardless of the type of aircraft they would eventually fly. During this phase, recruits completed 20 hours of dual-seat flight training and 70 hours of solo flight. After this basic training, a two-month course followed, focusing on the specific aircraft type that the pilots were assigned to fly. Advanced flight training lasted four months and concentrated on specialized skills such as formation flying, combat tactics, aerial gunnery, and night flying. During this phase, pilots completed a total of 120 flight hours in training and older aircraft models.

Following advanced training, pilots were transferred to an operational unit for further training. This phase usually lasted six months and focused on combat tactics and adaptation to local combat conditions. Although the training period was officially six months, pilots frequently participated in combat missions before completing this phase. The goal was to ensure that trainees had at least 400 flight hours before entering combat. In the fall of 1943, Japan expanded its wartime emergency organization by introducing conscription for university and college students, who had previously been exempt from military service, to increase the influx of pilots.

It is estimated that approximately 4,000 educational institutions were closed as a result. This substantial influx of new recruits exceeded the capacity of the two existing training organizations, leading to a significant expansion of basic flight training facilities in the spring of 1944. The number of flight training regiments increased from 18 to approximately 50. At the same time, these regiments were renamed flight training units, and additional units were established to provide specialized flight training.

By the second half of 1944, these units were almost evenly distributed across Manchuria, Korea, Formosa (Taiwan), the Philippines, Malaya, Java, and China, with each region assigned a flight training brigade responsible for overseeing the activities of these units. These brigades, in turn, were subordinate to the air army in whose area they were stationed and were responsible for training in their respective regions.

== Fanaticism and war crimes ==
Throughout the Second Sino-Japanese War and World War II, the Imperial Japanese Army had gained a reputation both for its fanaticism and for its brutality against prisoners of war and civilians alike, of which the Nanjing Massacre is the most well known example. After Japan's surrender, many Imperial Japanese Army officers and enlisted men were tried for committing numerous atrocities and war crimes in the International Military Tribunal for the Far East. The trials ceased in 1949, with a total of 5,700 cases having been heard.

One major reason that the IJA exhibited such brutality towards foreign civilians, prisoners of war, and soldiers stemmed from the fact that Japanese soldiers were treated equally harshly in training. Japanese recruits would be beaten, given unnecessarily strenuous duty tasks, insufficient food, and other violent or harsh disciplinary tactics, and so Japanese soldiers were simply reciprocating the behavior they had experienced themselves. Senior Japanese officers, provoked by ideas of jingoism and racial animosity, believed it was only fair to abuse Americans and Europeans, the same way they believed Japan had been abused economically during the interwar period and Meiji Restoration, this, combined with a distorted version of bushido and the traditionalism woven through Japanese militarism, allowed for lower-ranked officers to engage in brutality by threatening to overthrow/assassinate senior officers (gekokujo) if their goals or impunity were not kept.

== See also ==
- Imperial Japanese Navy in World War II
- Structure of the Imperial Japanese forces in the South Seas Mandate, details on Japanese forces in bypassed islands
