= Rikichi =

- Gender: Male

Origin
- Origin: Japanese
- Meaning: Different meanings depending on the kanji used

Rikichi (written: 利吉 or 理喜智) is a masculine Japanese given name. Notable people with the name include:

- Rikichi Andō (安藤 利吉; 1884–1946), Japanese general
- Dewaminato Rikichi (出羽湊 利吉; 1907–1964), Japanese sumo wrestler
- Rikichi Tsukada (塚田 理喜智; 1892–1958), Japanese general
