= Type 100 grenade discharger =

20th Century Grenade Launcher

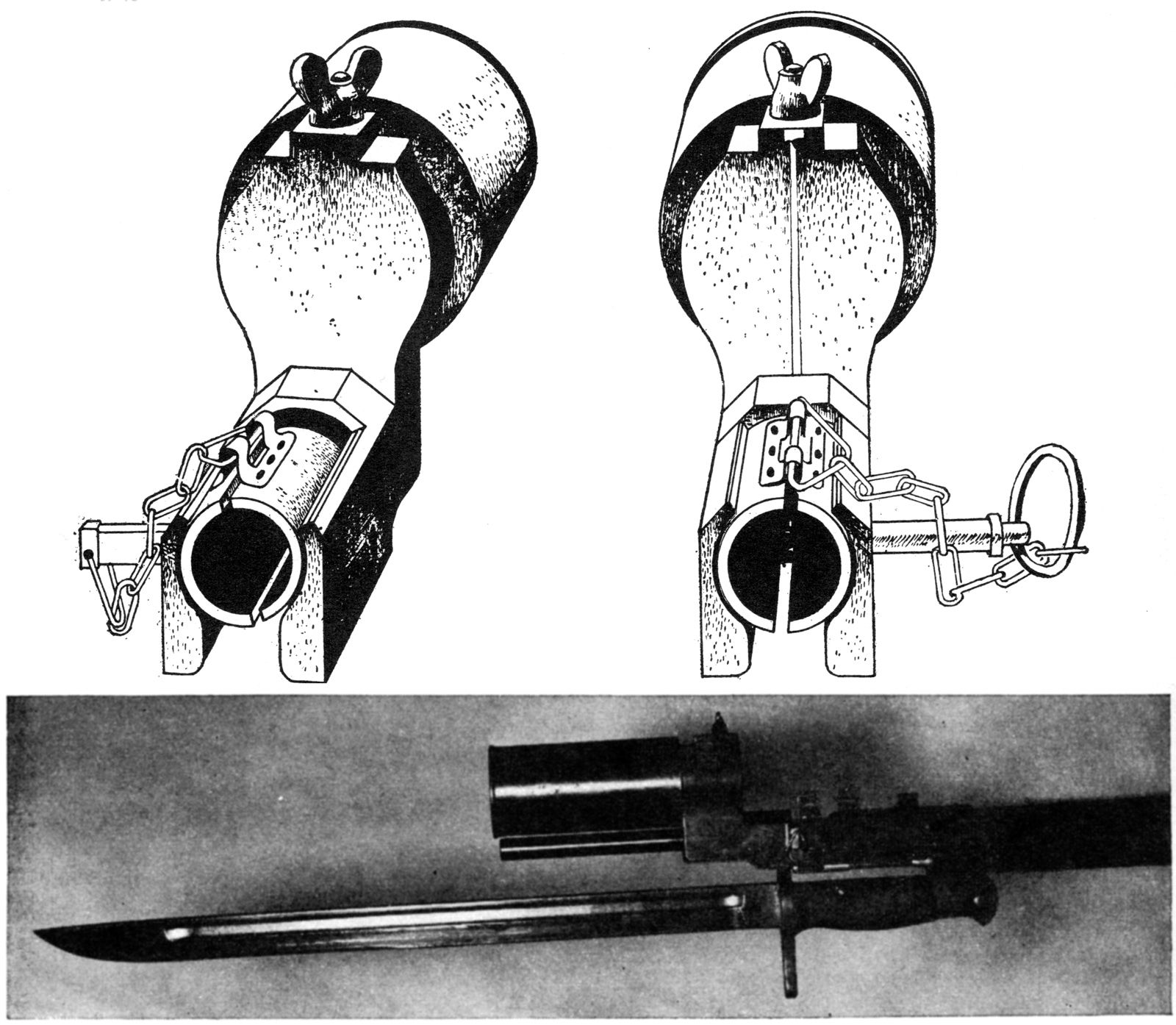
- Type 100 rifle grenade launcher
- Type: Rifle grenade
- Place of origin: Empire of Japan

Service history
- Wars: Second World War

Production history
- Designed: 1939

The Type 100 grenade discharger (一〇〇式擲弾器) was introduced in 1939 as a grenade launcher for the Type 38 and Type 99 Arisaka rifles.

== Design ==
The Type 100 launches standard Type 91 and Type 99 hand-grenades.

The launcher is somewhat unusual in that rather than using the more common cup designs it is a gas trap system, meaning that it incorporates a barrel extension which taps off excess propellant gases to launch the grenade from a cup offset from the barrel.

This has the advantage that standard rifle cartridges could be used along with the standard hand-grenades which simplified logistics, at the expense of increased weight and decreased efficiency.

The effective range is approximately 100 yards (91 m).

== Users ==
- Empire of Japan
  - Imperial Japanese Army
  - Imperial Japanese Navy

== See also ==
- Rifle grenade
