= Type 10 grenade =

Japanese fragmentation grenade

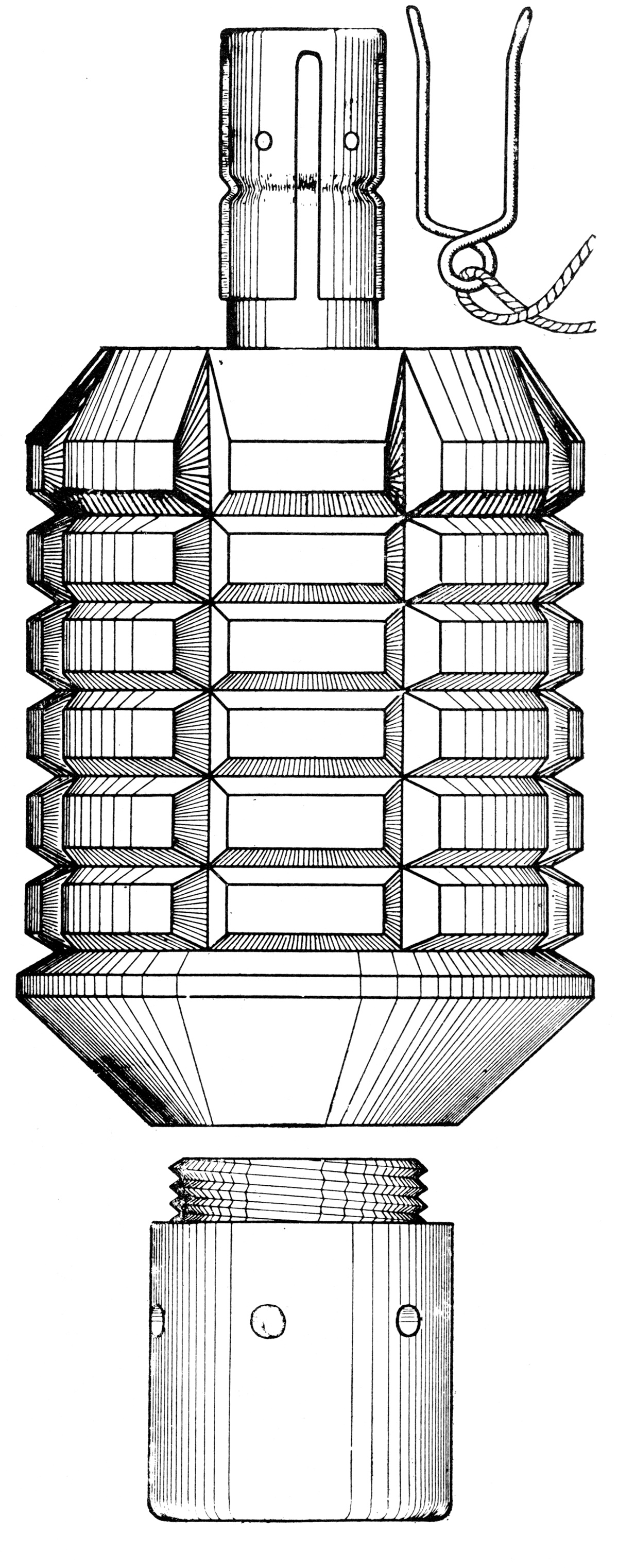
- Drawing of a Type 10 grenade
- Type: Hand grenade; Rifle grenade
- Place of origin: Empire of Japan

Service history
- In service: 1921–1945
- Used by: See § Users
- Wars: Second Sino-Japanese War; World War II

Production history
- Variants: See § Variants

Specifications
- Mass: 526 g (18.6 oz)
- Length: 110 mm (4.3 in)
- Diameter: 50 mm (2.0 in)
- Filling: TNT
- Filling weight: 50 g (1.8 oz)
- Detonation mechanism: 7-second timer

The Type 10 grenade (十年式手榴弾, Jyūnen-shiki Teryūdan) was one of the earliest purpose-made fragmentation grenade designed and deployed by the Imperial Japanese Army.

== History and development ==
During the Russo-Japanese War, the Japanese made use of improvised designs such as empty pottery jars, meat cans or even bamboo segments filled with guncotton or picric acid, alongside pipe bombs and empty artillery shell cases filled with guncotton. Introduced in 1921, the Type 10 was one of the earliest purpose-made grenades made by the Japanese, capable of being either thrown by hand or via the Type 10 or the later Type 89 grenade discharger.

The Type 10 was used by the Imperial Japanese ground forces, with signalling flare grenades widely used by battalion and regimental headquarter units. The high-explosive (HE) grenade was replaced in 1931 by the Type 91, but remained in limited use into the 1940s, with the United States intelligence reporting that the Type 10 discharger was primarily used in the signalling role during World War II.

== Design ==
The Type 10 was a multi-purpose grenade, capable of being hand-thrown or launched from the Type 10 or the later Type 89 grenade discharger. When hand-thrown, the percussion cap-type fuze had to be struck against a hard surface after pulling the safety pin. When launched from a Type 10 or 89 discharger, a plug containing the propellant charge and primer was screwed on the bottom of the grenade.

The main issues of the Type 10 included the need for a loose fit for the grenade to slide into the barrel (resulting in gas leaks) and the poor aerodynamic shape of the grenade reduced range and accuracy of the grenade discharger; in the hand-thrown role, the Japanese recognized that the 7-second delay fuze was too long (Note: Rottman stated that the Type 10 could be fitted a 4–5 second fuze for hand-throwing.) while the 50 g (1.8 oz) TNT payload was too small. Another issue with the design was the highly variable and inaccurate fuse timing, which could result in premature detonation: US troops were instructed to immediately throw captured grenades after activating them.

In the dedicated hand grenade role, the Type 10 was replaced by the Type 91 grenade, which had a larger explosive filling; in rifle grenade role the Type 89 HE shell replaced it, having a superior range and triple the TNT payload.

== Variants ==
The following munition types were made for the Type 10 grenade discharger:

- HE (Replaced by the Type 91 grenade in 1931)
- Flare
- Signal
- Smoke (Designated as the Type 11)
- Blank

== Users ==
- Empire of Japan
  - Imperial Japanese Army
  - Imperial Japanese Navy
