= Type 97 grenade =

Type 97 hand grenade
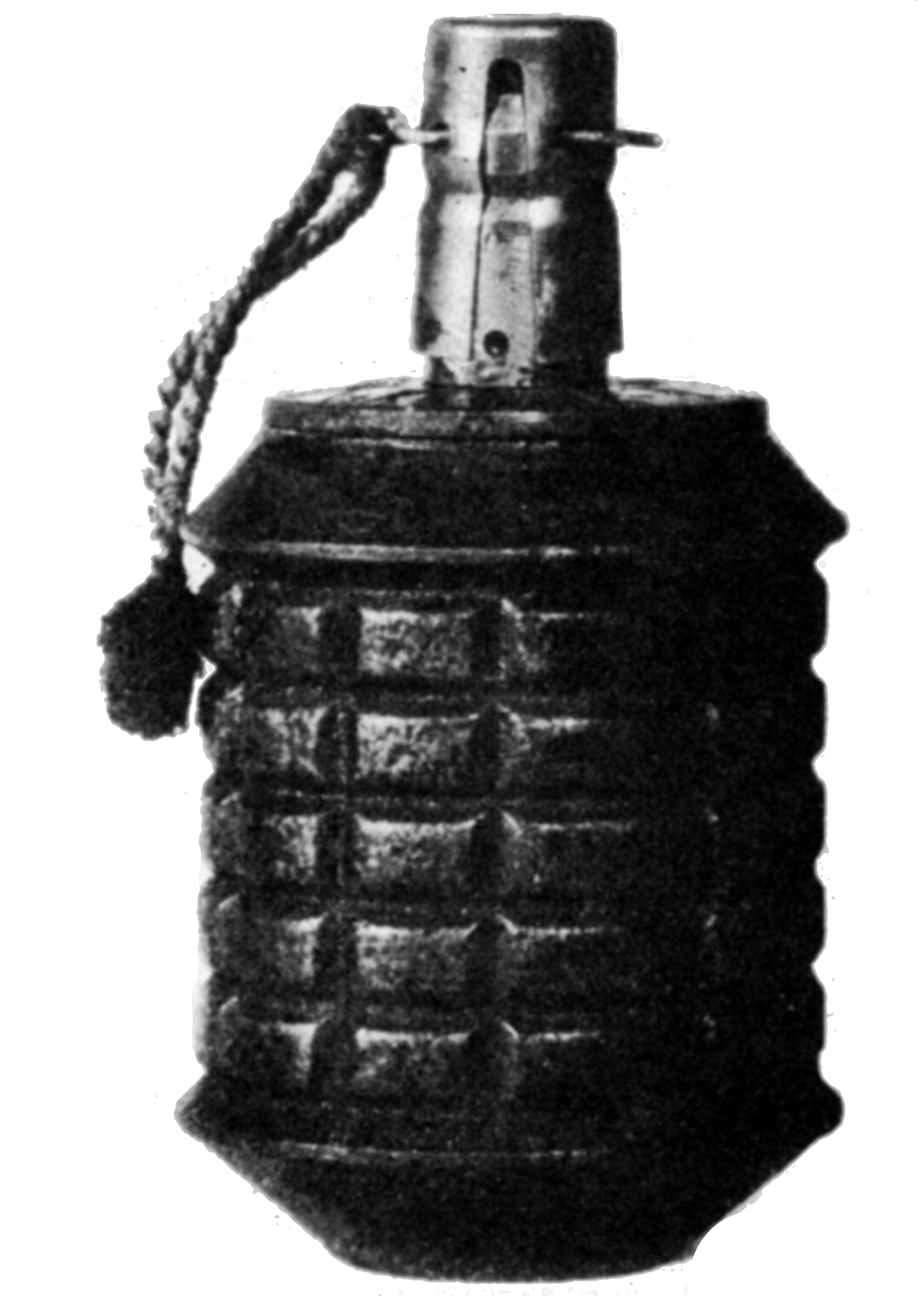
- A Japanese Type 97 grenade, with the safety fork still in place
- Type: Hand grenade
- Place of origin: Empire of Japan

Service history
- In service: 1937–1945
- Wars: Second Sino-Japanese War; Soviet-Japanese Border Wars; World War II; Chinese Civil War; Hukbalahap Rebellion; Indonesian National Revolution; First Indochina War; Malayan Emergency

Production history
- Designed: 1936

Specifications
- Mass: 0.45 kg (16 oz)
- Length: 3.78 in (9.6 cm)
- Filling: TNT
- Filling weight: 65 g (2.3 oz)
- Detonation mechanism: Pyrotechnic delay 4 to 5 seconds

The Type 97 hand grenade (九七式手榴弾, Kyūnana-shiki Teryūdan) was the standard fragmentation hand grenade of the Imperial Japanese Army and Imperial Japanese Navy SNLF during the Second Sino-Japanese War and World War II.

== History and development ==
The Type 97 was developed from the earlier Type 91 grenade which could also be used as a fragmentation hand grenade, but was predominantly used as munitions for the Type 10, and Type 89 grenade launchers.

For this reason, it had less explosive power and a relatively longer delay time than a dedicated manual hand grenade.

To address these issues, the Army Technical Bureau developed a new design in 1937. The body was painted black and the top plate red signifying an explosive charge.

== Design ==
The Type 97 had the same form as most fragmentation grenades of the period: a cylindrical "pineapple grooved" segmented body which dispersed sharp pieces of shrapnel when it exploded.

However, unlike "pin-pull" grenades of other armies, ignition of the time fuse was achieved by direct percussion of a striker.

For safe storage the firing pin was retracted in the striker body. To use, the operator would first screw the firing pin down so that it protruded from the base of the striker. Then the safety pin would be removed by pulling the cord to which it was attached; the protective cap which covered the striker was removed.

A sharp blow against a hard surface, such as a rock, a tree trunk, rifle stock, the side of a boot heel, or combat helmet would overcome a creep spring and crush a thin brass cap, allowing the pin to hit the primer and initiate the delay sequence before throwing at the target.

Yet, in comparison with Allied hand grenades of the period, the explosive force of the Type 97 was weaker and, due to lack of an automatic ignition mechanism, the grenade in practice was found to be unreliable and even dangerous to use because of its erratic fuse.

Physically, the Type 97 was almost indistinguishable from the Type 91, except that it had no attachment on the base for a propellant canister. Paper labels with ink-stamped fill dates warned of the shorter, 4-5 second, delay.

== Combat record ==
The Type 97 hand grenade was issued as standard equipment to Japanese infantrymen in the Second Sino-Japanese War and throughout the various campaigns of World War II.

The Type 97 was used by independence movements across Southeast Asia against their European colonizers after the end of World War II.

== Users ==
- Empire of Japan
  - Imperial Japanese Army
  - Imperial Japanese Navy: Japanese Special Naval Landing Forces

== Bibliography ==
- US Department of War (1994). Handbook on Japanese Military Forces, TM-E 30-480 (1945) (reprint ed.). Louisiana State University Press. ISBN 0-8071-2013-8.
- Rottman, Gordon L. (2005). Japanese Infantryman 1937-1945. Osprey Publishing. ISBN 1-84176-818-9.
- Departments of the Army and the Air Force (1953). Japanese Explosive Ordnance, TM 9-1985-4. ASIN B000H7NCDS.
