= Rikichi Tsukada =

General in the Imperial Japanese Army in World War II

- 塚田 理喜智
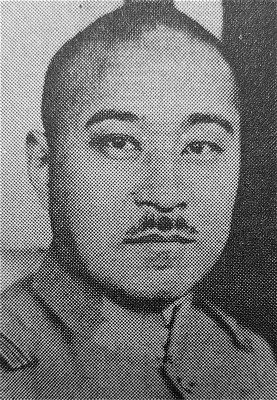
- Born: December 15, 1892; Ishikawa Prefecture, Japan
- Died: May 19, 1958 (aged 65)
- Military career
- Allegiance: Empire of Japan
- Branch: Imperial Japanese Army
- Service years: 1916-1945
- Rank: Lieutenant General
- Commands: Teishin Shudan
- Conflicts: Second Sino-Japanese War; World War II

Rikichi Tsukada (塚田 理喜智, Tsukada Rikichi; December 15, 1892 – May 19, 1958) was a lieutenant general of the Imperial Japanese Army.

== Biography ==
Tsukada was born in Ishikawa Prefecture. In May 1916, he graduated from the 28th class of the Imperial Japanese Army Academy and was commissioned as a second lieutenant in the infantry. In November 1924, he graduated from the 36th class of the Army Staff College. He was assigned to administrative work within the Imperial Japanese Army General Staff Office. He later changed to the Imperial Japanese Army Air Service, becoming an instructor at the Hamamatsu Army Flight School in March 1933. He was attached to the staff of the Japanese China Garrison Army from May 1936 and to the intelligence staff of the Japanese Northern China Area Army from the start of the Second Sino-Japanese War. In March 1938, he was promoted to air corps colonel, and appointed commander of the IJAA 7th Air Regiment from June. In December 1939 he was transferred to become chief-of-staff of the IJAA First Air Brigade. Tsukada was promoted to major general in August 1941 and entered the Pacific War.

In April 1942, Tsukada became commander of the IJAA 3rd Air Division, and from February 1944, chief-of-staff of the IJAA Third Air Force. From November 1944, Tsukada became commander of airborne operations training for the Teishin Shudan and commander of the 30,000-man Kenbu force defending central Luzon and Clark Field against the Americans during the Philippines campaign. A portion of this force, the 750-man 2nd Raiding Brigade, was an elite commando force assigned to attack American air bases in Luzon and Leyte. It inflicted numerous casualties before they were annihilated. In March 1945, Tsukada was promoted to lieutenant general; however, by early April his command had been largely annihilated, and he ordered his remaining men to fight as independent guerrilla units in the mountains west of Clark Field. The Alamo Scouts of the Sixth US Army were assigned to capture him, but he escaped and turned himself in after the surrender of Japan.

He died on May 19, 1958.
