= Type 99 81 mm mortar =

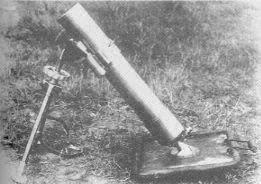
- Japanese Type 99 81 mm mortar
- Place of origin: Empire of Japan

Service history
- Used by: Imperial Japanese Army
- Wars: World War II

Production history
- Produced: 1939-1944
- No. built: unknown

Specifications
- Mass: 24 kg (52.91 lb)
- Length: 717 mm (2 ft 4.2 in)
- Barrel length: 552 mm (1 ft 9.7 in)
- Width: 673.1 mm (2 ft 2.50 in) (baseplate)
- Shell weight: 3.3 kg (7 lb 4 oz)
- Caliber: 81 mm (3.19 in)
- Action: Manual
- Elevation: +45 to +85 degrees
- Muzzle velocity: 82 m/s (269 ft/s)
- Effective firing range: 650 m (710 yd)

The Type 99 81 mm mortar (Japanese as "Kyukyu Shiki Shohakuyekiho", meaning "99 model small trench mortar") was a Japanese mortar used by the Imperial Japanese Army during World War II. Its primary role was that of a lightweight mortar for assault and airborne troops that could be quickly assembled or disassembled. To ease transportation, the Type 99 mortar broke down into three loads, each of which was about 8 kg. The Type 99 81 mm mortar differs from the Type 97 81 mm infantry mortar in the shortness of its tube and in the method of firing. The Type 99 designation was given to this mortar as it was accepted in the year 2599 of the Japanese calendar (1939).

== Design ==
The Type 99 is a smooth bore, muzzle-loading weapon of the Stokes-Brandt type. The Type 99 81 mm mortar differs from the Type 97 81 mm infantry mortar in the shortness of its tube, which is only 21.75 inches (55.25 centimetres) as compared with 45.34 in (115.16 cm) of the Type 97. The mortar can be disassembled into three units: the tube, the bipod, and the base plate. The legs of the bipod, made of tubular steel, are mounted on the elevating screw housing by a clevis joint. The reported range of the weapon of about 2,200 yards has not been conclusively confirmed.

The differences between the Type 99 and the US 81-mm mortar, M1 are pronounced. The tube length of the Japanese weapon is only about half that of the US mortar: 25.5 in (64.77 cm) vs 59.5 in (151.13 cm) . Of much greater significance, however, is the difference in the method of firing. Whereas the Type 97 has a fixed firing pin in the base cap, the Type 99 has its firing pin affixed to a camshaft that extends outside the base cap of the mortar. This shaft must be struck a sharp blow with a mallet to drive it inward so as to force the firing pin against the primer of the propellant cartridge.

== Firing system ==
This mortar has a unique firing system. Most mortars of less than 200 mm bore size use a fixed firing pin at the bottom of the tube, and as the shell is dropped into the tube, the shell slides down to the bottom, where the firing pin strikes the primer in the base of the shell, igniting the propellant. The US M1 mortar uses this system. Larger mortars such as the breech loading M1919 12-inch Coastal defense mortar are manually fired once the shell is in the mortar, using a lanyard pull to strike the firing pin igniting the propellant or electrically with a primer that ignites the propellant when the firing switch is closed. The Type 99 mortar is fired by manually striking a trigger with a hammer or other heavy object.

== Specifications ==
Specifications of the Type 99 81 mm mortar are as follows:

Total weight:	23.59 kg (52.01 lb)
Weight of tube:	7.94 kg (17.50 lb)
Weight of bipod:	7.48 kg (16.49 lb)
Weight of base plate:	8.3 kg (18.30 lb)
Projectile weight:	3.3 kg (7 lb 4 oz)
Over-all length:	647.7 mm (25.5 in)
Length of bore:	546.1 mm (21.5 in)
Diameter of bore:	81 mm (3.19 in)
Length of base plate:	165.1 mm (6.5 in)
Width of base plate:	362 mm (14.3 in)
Elevation:	+45 to 85 degrees
Muzzle velocity:	196 m/s (643 ft/s)
Range:	2,000 m (2,200 yd)

== Ammunition ==
Two types of ammunition, smoke or chemical, and high-explosive are known. Likewise, there are two weights of shells-7.2 pounds and 14.3 pounds.

There is also a green signal flare fired from the Type 99 81-mm mortar, as well as a parachute smoke signal. The 81mm mortar was also used to launch an unusual AA Mine Discharger shell.

The following results were achieved in a firing test that employed both Japanese ammunition and U. S. M43A.

Firing Table
Range with Japanese Ammunition	Range with U. S. M43A Ammunition	Elevation (degrees)	Charge (no.of increments)
2,011.68 m (2,200.00 yd)	2,313.43 m (2,530.00 yd)	45.0	6
1,865.38 m (2,040.00 yd)	2,139.70 m (2,340.00 yd)	56.2	6
1,554.48 m (1,700.00 yd)	1,737.36 m (1,900.00 yd)	45.0	4
1,444.75 m (1,580.00 yd)	1,568.20 m (1,715.00 yd)	56.2	4
914.40 m (1,000.00 yd)	1,165.86 m (1,275.00 yd)	45.0	2
822.96 m (900.00 yd)	1,005.84 m (1,100.00 yd)	56.2	2
411.48 m (450.00 yd)	470.92 m (515.00 yd)	45.0	0

The Japanese generally were poorly prepared for the proper packaging of ammunition at the start of the war. Ammunition of all kinds was packed in wooden boxes with fillers to hold it in position, and only the most rudimentary protection against moisture was provided by tarring joints and knot holes and occasionally wrapping rounds in wax paper for additional waterproofing. In view of the faulty packaging, it was common for 50 per cent to 90 per cent of hand grenades and mortar shells to fail to function. Now, however, the Japanese are utilizing metal and asphalt-impregnated paper linings for their ammunition containers, and consequently deterioration has been materially lessened.
