= Type 89 grenade discharger =

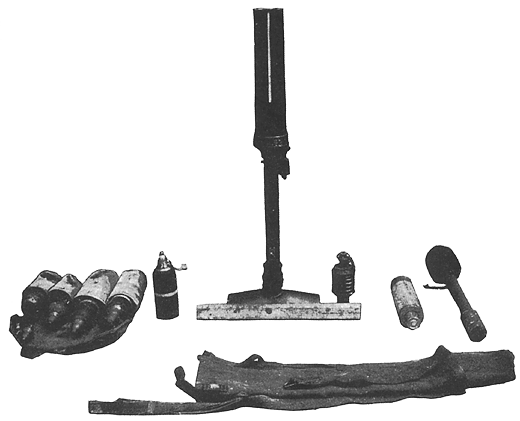
- Type 89 grenade discharger with various grenades, shells, and accessories
- Type: Light mortar
- Place of origin: Empire of Japan

Service history
- In service: 1929–1945 by Japan, indeterminate postwar usage by various forces.
- Used by: See Users
- Wars: Soviet–Japanese border conflicts Second Sino-Japanese War; World War II; Indonesian National Revolution; Malayan Emergency; Korean War; First Indochina War; Vietnam War

Production history
- Manufacturer: Nagoya, Kokura, Osaka Army Arsenals
- Produced: 1932–1945
- No. built: 89,377

Specifications
- Mass: 4.7 kg (10 lb 6 oz)
- Length: 610 mm (24 in)
- Barrel length: 254 mm (10 in)
- Cartridge: 793 g (1 lb 12 oz)
- Caliber: 50 mm (1.97 in)
- Rate of fire: 25 rpm
- Maximum firing range: (Type 89 shell): 670 m (732 yd) (Type 10 grenade, Type 91 grenade): 200 m (219 yd)

The Type 89 grenade discharger (八九式重擲弾筒, Hachikyū-shiki jū-tekidantō), inaccurately and colloquially known as a knee mortar by Allied forces, is a Japanese grenade launcher or light mortar that was widely used in the Pacific Theater of World War II.

== Background ==
The Japanese Army, noting that grenades were short-ranged weapons, began efforts to optimize these weapons for close-in infantry fighting.

After studying employment of grenades and mortars on the battlefield, the Japanese Army developed hand grenades, rifle grenades, and grenade and mortar shell dischargers (small mortars) suited to warfare in typical short-range combat environments such as urban, trench, and jungle warfare.

As part of this effort, by 1932, the Japanese Army had adopted a set of fragmentation grenades with almost universal adaptability.

The Type 91 fragmentation grenade could be thrown by hand, fired from a spigot-type launcher, or used in a mortar-like grenade discharger, the Type 89.

== Design ==
The Type 89 heavy grenade discharger was adopted in 1929, but production did not begin until 1932. It differs from the earlier Type 10 grenade discharger in that it has a longer rifled barrel.

The Type 89 could fire two types of high explosive grenades or shells: the Type 91 grenade, which was a normal infantry fragmentation grenade adapted to the Type 89 discharger, and the 0.91 kg (~2 lb) Type 89 50 mm shell, which was an impact-detonated shell with considerably more explosive power.

Like its predecessor, the Type 10 grenade launcher, the Type 89 grenade launcher was also used as a signal flare device.

=== Operation ===
To fire a shell, it was dropped base-down into the discharger's tube. The aiming direction was checked using a line on the barrel. The range was not changed by raising or lowering the barrel like other mortars. The discharger is set at a fixed angle of 45 degrees, as indicated by a bubble level indicator. The range to the target was adjusted by turning a dial that altered the volume of the gas chamber by moving the firing pin, along with the trigger assembly, up and down. The trigger was then pulled to fire the weapon.

When fired from the Type 89 discharger, the Type 91 fragmentation grenade was fitted with a propellant base and time fuse. It did not explode upon contact, but was designed to ignite its fuse while in flight.

A weak creep spring inside the grenade firing mechanism allowed the firing pin to be thrown back upon launching, igniting a time fuse with a 7-8 second delay. Using this system, the Type 91 grenades could be launched through jungle cover or through small openings without the danger of premature detonation in the event the grenade struck an object on its way to the target.

Although the Type 89 could be fired by a single person, it was typically operated by a crew of three, enabling it to reach a rate of fire of about 25 rounds per minute.

=== Ammunition ===
The Type 89 could be used with the following ammunitions:

- Type 89 50 mm HE (high explosive) mortar shell (fitted with impact detonator) [Weight: ~2.00 lb (0.91 kg)]
- Type 91 fragmentation grenade (fitted with 7 second delay time fuse, ignited in flight)
- Type 94 50 mm practice shell
- Smoke shell weight: 0.9 kg containing 0.11 kg of HC type smoke mixture
- Incendiary shell weight: 0.57 kg containing 0.32 kg of incendiary material

The Type 89 discharger could also be used with a more powerful impact-detonated shell approaching the power of a light mortar.

Weighing approximately 2 pounds (910 g), it was known as the Type 89 50 mm shell, and was made in high explosive (HE), incendiary and smoke variants.

Soldiers could adjust fire onto multiple targets at varying ranges while firing the contact-detonated 50 mm shell through a single small clearing in the jungle canopy. The method worked equally well when firing from deep trenches or pits, or between various building obstructions when fighting inside a built-up town or city.

With its curved support plate, the Type 89 was designed to be placed on the ground or against a log or trunk at a fixed firing angle of 45 degrees. However, since it used a spring-loaded, lanyard-operated firing pin mechanism, in an emergency it could fire grenades or shells at point targets while braced horizontally against a tree or building.

== Name ==
It got the nickname the "knee mortar" because of an erroneous translation of the word "ankle" (Japanese soldiers often carried the weapon strapped to their lower leg which led to their use of the term "ankle"). This mistranslation, along with the curved baseplate that was roughly the same diameter as a human thigh, led to the Allied soldiers' belief that these launchers could be fired by propping its plate against the leg. However, anyone trying to fire it this way would receive a severe bruise (or sometimes a broken femur) from its hefty recoil.

== Combat use ==
The Imperial Japanese Army issued three Type 89s per platoon, making it their most widely used infantry fire support weapon.

The Type 89 discharger saw service at the Battle of Khalkhin Gol in Manchuria during the Second Sino-Japanese War. During World War II, the weapon was used effectively against the Allied defenders in the Battle of Corregidor in May 1942.

It also saw service in Burma and the Pacific islands. Japanese Navy paratroopers carried special containers for the Type 89 clipped to their harnesses to provide fire support right on the landing zone.

Allied troops quickly learned to take cover when they heard the weapon's "pop" when launching its grenades or shells, in some cases from more than 200 yd (180 m) away.

The Imperial Japanese Army considered the Type 89 grenade launcher to be an effective weapon, often employing two to four pieces as part of a typical rifle platoon. The primary target during engagements was the enemy's automatic weapons, such as emplaced medium machine guns.

After World War II, the Type 89 was used by Indonesian National Army and militias against Dutch forces in the Indonesian National Revolution, with copies of the weapon manufactured in Demakijo, Yogyakarta. Others were used by Communist forces during Chinese Civil War and Korean War. Some were also used by the Việt Minh during First Indochina War and by the Viet Cong during the Vietnam War.

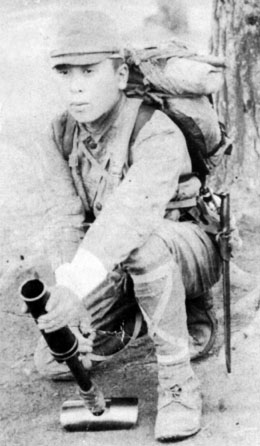
Japanese soldier demonstrating the correct use of the Type 89 discharger

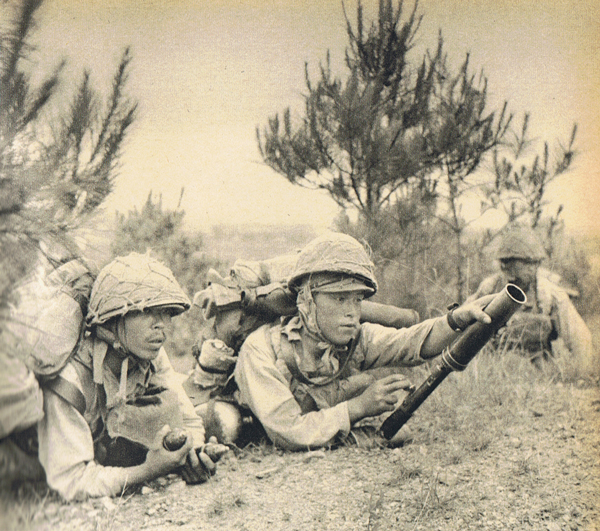
In use in Zhèjiāng Province, China (1942)

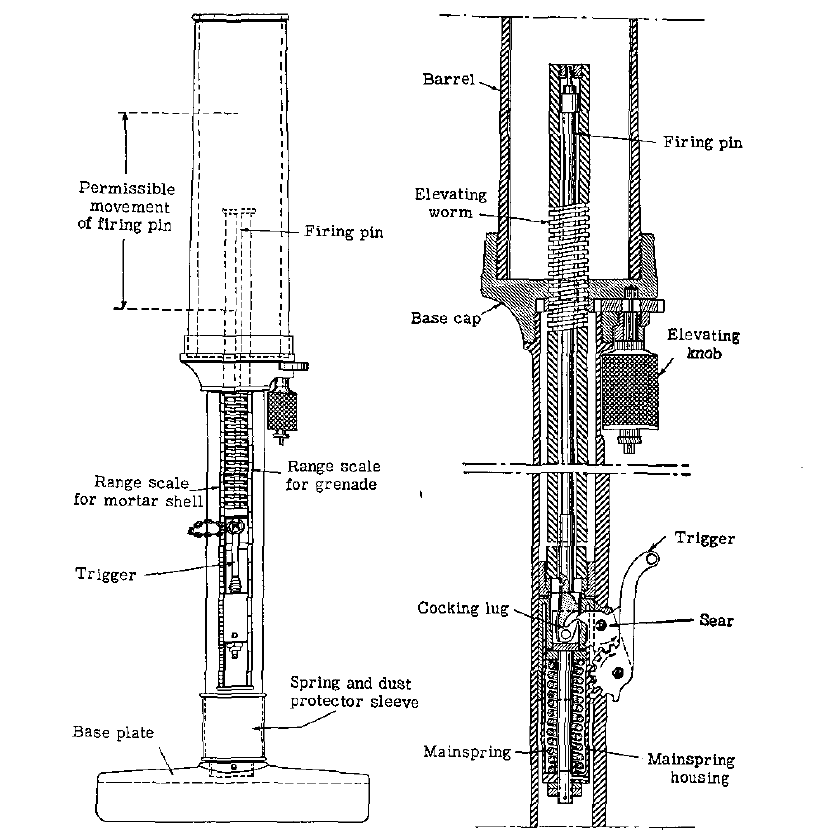
Type 89 diagram

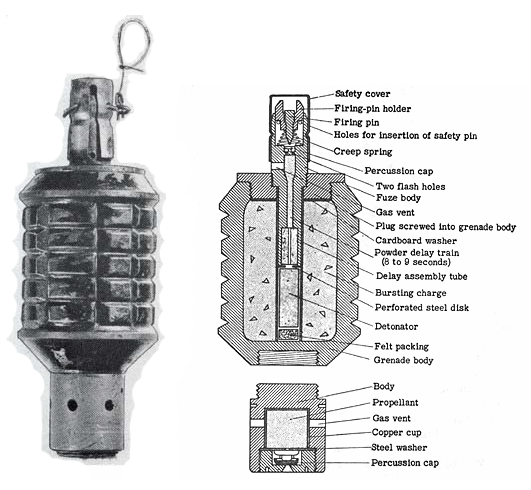
Type 91 fragmentation grenade

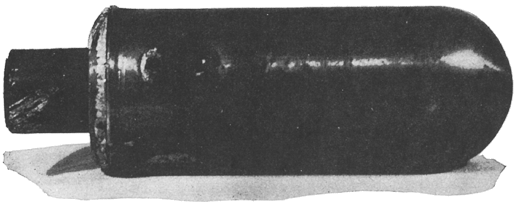
Type 89 50 mm incendiary shell

== Users ==
- China
- Japan: Imperial Japanese Army.
- Indonesia: Indonesian National Army
- North Korea
- South Korea
- Vietnam

== See also ==
- Chinese Type 27, simplified Chinese derivative
- Granatnik wz. 36, a Polish mortar with a similar range adjusting mechanism that works by changing the volume of the gas chamber.
- Commando mortar, a class of infantry light mortars designed for maximum portability and rapid deployment, at the expense of accuracy and rate of fire.
- LGI Mle F1, a French close-support weapon infantry weapon designed to be used by one man
