= Type 10 grenade discharger =

Japanese WWII grenade launcher

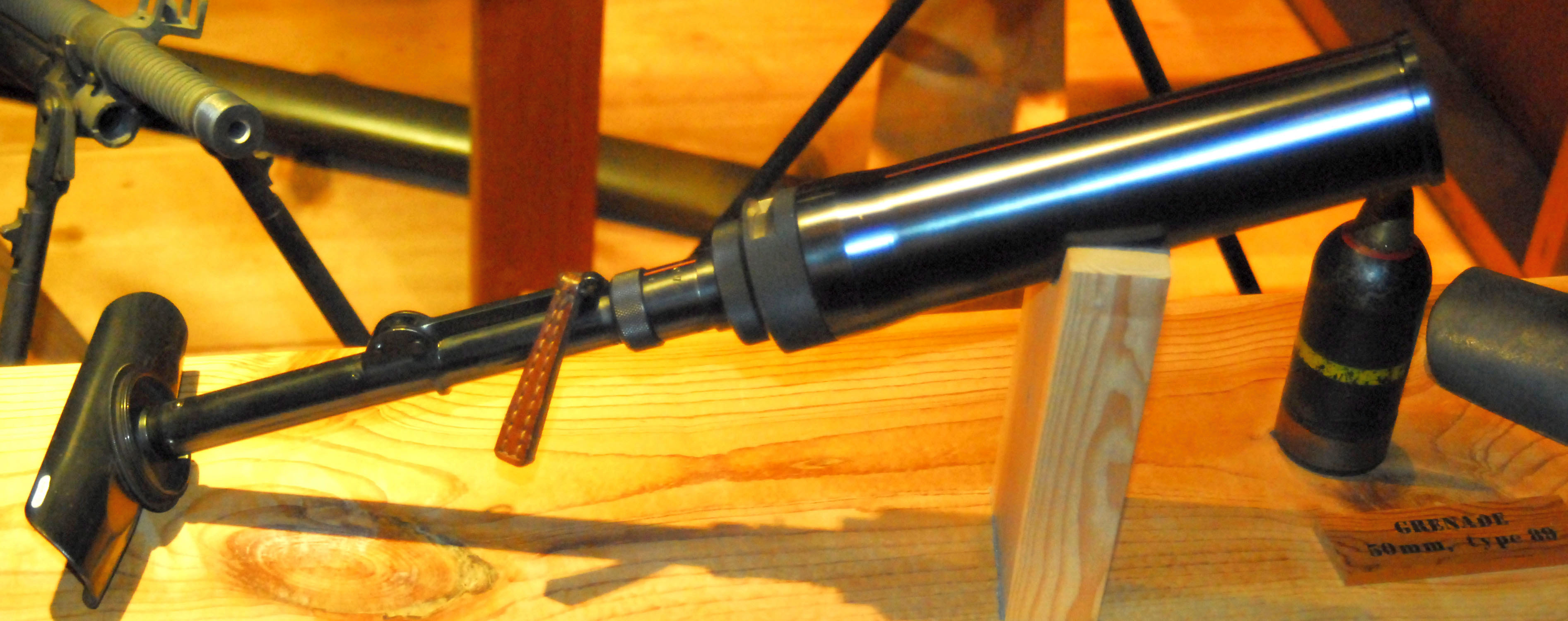
- Type: Light mortar
- Place of origin: Empire of Japan

Service history
- In service: 1921–1945
- Wars: Second Sino-Japanese War, World War II, Indonesian National Revolution, Malayan Emergency, Korean War

Production history
- Designed: 1918–1920
- Produced: 1921–1937

Specifications
- Mass: 2.6 kg (5 lb 12 oz)
- Length: 525 mm (20.7 in)
- Barrel length: 240 mm (9.5 in)
- Shell weight: .53 kg (1 lb 3 oz)
- Caliber: 50 mm (1.97 in)
- Effective firing range: (Type 91 grenade): 65 m (71 yd)
- Maximum firing range: (Type 91 grenade): 175 m (191 yd)

The Type 10 grenade discharger (十年式擲弾筒, Juu-nen-shiki tekidantō) was a Japanese smoothbore, muzzle loaded weapon used during the Second World War. It was copied and used by the Chinese under the designation Type 27 grenade launcher.

== History ==
The Type 10 first entered service with the Imperial Japanese Army (IJA) in 1921. It was initially used to launch high-explosive (HE) Type 10 grenades alongside pyrotechnic grenades; in 1931 the munition was replaced by the Type 91 grenade.

While it proved to be useful, the Type 10 had the drawback of having a loose fit between the grenade and barrel, which caused gas to leak out and subsequently reducing effective range. Another issue was the poor aerodynamic shape of the Type 10 grenade, which also affected range and accuracy.

These issues were fixed on the Type 89 grenade discharger, which fired a special HE shell with copper driving band through the rifled barrel with a greater range and could still fire standard HE hand grenades at shorter distances if necessary.

Shortly after the Marco Polo Bridge incident, the Nationalist government ordered the Hanyang Arsenal to reverse-engineer the Type 10. They initially made a close copy, but the design proved to be too complicated to manufacture and for soldiers to operate it. At the same time production was moved to the 30th Arsenal, where the design was simplified and approved for service in 1938 as the Type 27 grenade launcher. According to Ness and Shih, the Chinese produced a total of 40,909 launchers and 1,551,313 grenades during the war.

Captured Type 27s were primarily issued to the IJA non-combat units, such as transport and engineer units in China, though a few were taken with them as they were transferred to the Pacific islands and encountered in small numbers by the United States forces.

== Design ==
The Type 10 has a range of 175 m (191 yd), greater than other grenade dischargers of that time. It had a range control device at the base of the barrel in the form of a graduated thimble by which a gas port at the base of the tube could be varied in size. For shorter ranges, part of the propellant gases escape to the side. The manual for the mortar instructed the troops to carry the mortar on the upper thigh, with the base plate attached to the belt and the barrel running down the thigh. It was not strapped or secured directly to the thigh.

It was also carried strapped to the backpack.

=== Type 27 grenade launcher ===
A Chinese copy produced by the 30th Arsenal in 1939–1945, it was simplified to ease manufacturing (production time was one-third of the Type 10) and allow the use of lower-quality metal. It was slightly heavier than the original but it was liked by troops.

Ammunition was interchangeable with the Type 10, and both Japanese and Chinese forces frequently used captured weapons and ammunition during the war.

=== Ammunition ===
- Type 10 grenade − High-explosive shell, it was replaced in 1931 by the Type 91
- Type 91 grenade − HE shell
- Type 10 shell − Flare and signal shell
- Type 11 shell − Smoke shell
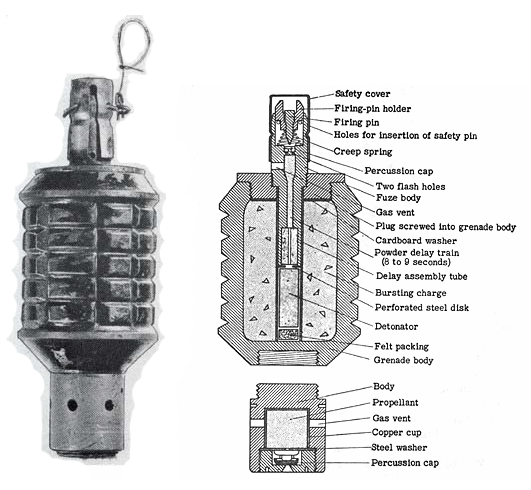
A Type 91 grenade.

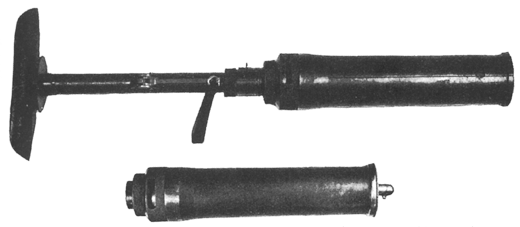
A Type 10 grenade discharger

=== Misconception ===
Due to a translation error, the Type 10 was called the "knee mortar" by the Americans.

American troops on Guadalcanal became aware of the name "knee mortar" and thought the light design allowed it to be fired with the base plate resting on the thigh. If the Type 10 were fired in this manner, it would result in serious injury due to recoil.

== Users ==
- Empire of Japan: Imperial Japanese Army
- China: Captured during the Second Sino-Japanese War. Produced locally as the Type 27 grenade launcher

== Bibliography ==
- Ness, Leland (2014). Rikugun: Volume 2 - Weapons of the Imperial Japanese Army & Navy Ground Forces. Helion and Company. ISBN 978-1909982758.
- Rottman, Gordon L. (2005). Japanese Army in World War II - Conquest of the Pacific 1941-42. Oxford, England: Osprey Publishing. ISBN 1841767891.
- Ness, Leland; Shih, Bin (2016). "Grenade Launchers". Kangzhan: Guide to Chinese Ground Forces 1937–45 (eBook ed.). Solihull, England: Helion & Company. ISBN 978-1-912174-46-1.
- "Chapter IX: Weapons". Handbook on Japanese Military Forces. Technical Manual. War Department. 1 October 1944. TM-E 30-480 – via Hyperwar Foundation.
- Daugherty, Leo J. III (2002). Fighting Techniques of a Japanese Infantryman 1941-1945. Spellmount. ISBN 1-86227-162-3.
