= Type 91 grenade =

Type 91 hand grenade
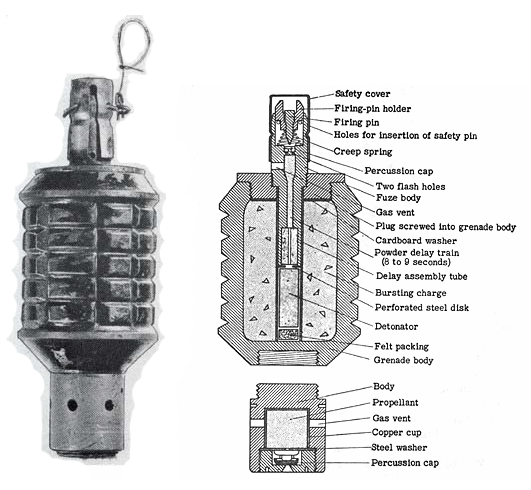
- Type 91 grenade
- Type: Hand grenade/rifle grenade
- Place of origin: Empire of Japan

Service history
- In service: 1931–1945
- Wars: Second Sino-Japanese War; Soviet–Japanese border conflicts World War II; Korean War; First Indochina War; Chinese Civil War

Production history
- Designed: 1931

Specifications
- Mass: 530 g (19 oz)
- Filling: TNT
- Filling weight: 65 g (2.3 oz)
- Detonation mechanism: Pyrotechnic delay of 7 to 8 seconds

The Type 91 hand grenade (九一式手榴弾, Kyūichi-shiki Teryūdan) was an improved version of the Type 10 fragmentation hand grenade/rifle grenade of the Imperial Japanese Army.

== History ==
The Japanese Army, noting that grenades were short-ranged weapons, began efforts to optimize these weapons for close-in infantry fighting. The first hand-thrown fragmentation grenade was the Type 10.

Soon after introduction of the Type 10 grenade to front line combat troops, a number of issues arose. When hand-thrown, instability and inaccuracy of the fuse mechanism made the Type 10 almost as much of a menace to the thrower as to the recipient. Furthermore, the weapon was regarded as undersized, and lacked desired lethality.

The Japanese Army continued to experiment with rifle and hand-thrown grenades between the wars and would adopt a family of fragmentation grenades with almost universal adaptability.

However, the Type 91, as well as other Japanese hand grenades suffered from faults in manufacturing and production of the fuse, grenade body, and explosive compound, resulting in inconsistent detonation, variable fuse burning times, and incomplete or variable fragmentation of the grenade body. During the war, these manufacturing issues remained unresolved.

=== Aftermath ===
Although superseded as a hand-thrown weapon by the Type 97 by the start of World War II it was still used by units in the Second Sino-Japanese War and by reserve forces, as well as the Japanese Navy's Special Naval Landing Forces.

== Design ==
Introduced in 1931, the Type 91 fragmentation grenade could be thrown by hand, fired from a cup-type grenade launcher (the Type 100), discharged by a lightweight mortar-like projector (the Type 89, or knee mortar), or fitted with finned tail-assembly and fired from a spigot-type rifle grenade launcher. The grenade is painted black, like all grenades used by Japan during World War II.

The design of the Type 91 grenade was almost identical to the earlier Type 10.

The main difference was the Type 91's domed top as opposed to the Type 10's serrated top. As with the Type 10, a threaded socket in the bottom of the body allowed for the attachment of an auxiliary propellant canister for use in a Type 89 grenade discharger.

The fuse was a percussion-activated delay type, initiated by pulling out a safety pin and striking the top of the cap.

The grenade incorporated a 7–8 second delay before detonation. This feature was incorporated as part of the Type 91's other uses as a rifle grenade or as a shell fired from the Type 89 grenade discharger, as the long delay enabled longer time-in-flight to distant targets.

When used as a rifle grenade the fuse activated automatically, as the plunger was pushed in against a weak creep spring by the force of the launch. Additionally, the Type 91 could be used as a booby trap by removing the safety pin and setting under a floorboard or chair.

=== Accessories ===
The Japanese military used spigot-type grenade launchers.

These grenade launchers were used by Japanese Naval Landing Forces to launch an anti-tank (hollow-charge) finned grenade. They were also used to propel Type 91 hand grenades fitted with tail-fin assemblies.

These grenades had wood-bulleted launching cartridges stored in their tail-fin assemblies. The cartridges are fired from the rifle and the wooden bullets are trapped by the tail-fin assemblies launching and arming the grenade. These launchers are not numbered, and production figures are not available and examples of spigot grenade launchers are rarely encountered.

==== Type 89 ====
The Type 89 discharger was introduced in 1939, the Type 91 fragmentation grenade was fitted with a propellant base and time fuse. It did not explode upon contact, but was designed to ignite its fuse while in flight.

A weak creep spring inside the grenade firing mechanism allowed the firing pin to be thrown back upon launching, igniting a time fuse with a 7-8 second delay. Using this system, the Type 91 grenades could be launched through jungle cover or through small openings without the danger of premature detonation in the event the grenade struck an object on its way to the target.

Although the Type 89 could be fired by a single person, it was typically operated with a crew of three, enabling it to reach a rate of fire of about 25 rounds per minute.

==== Type 100 ====
The Type 100 grenade discharger was introduced in 1939 as a grenade discharger on Arisaka rifles for Type 91 and Type 99 hand grenades.

The launcher is somewhat unusual in that rather than using the more common cup designs it is a gas trap system, meaning that it incorporates a barrel extension which taps off excess propellent gases to launch the grenade from a cup offset from the barrel.

This has the advantage that standard rifle cartridges could be used along with the standard hand-grenades which simplified logistics, at the expense of increased weight and decreased efficiency.

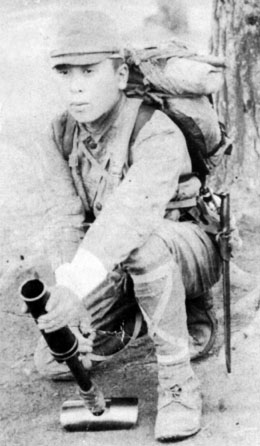
Japanese soldier demonstrating the correct use of the Type 89 discharger

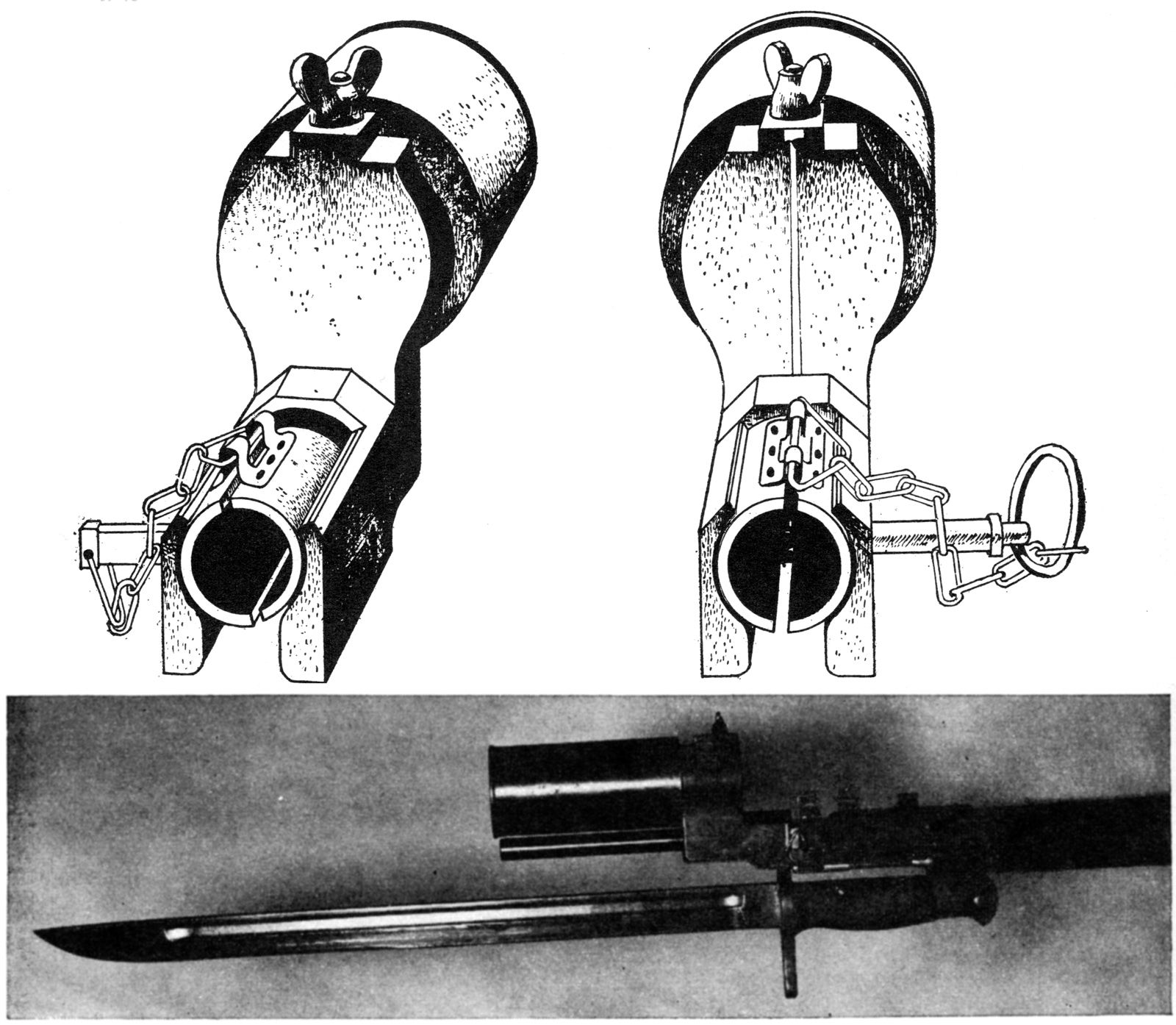
Japanese Type 100 rifle grenade launcher used to launch standard Type 91 hand-grenades

== Variants ==
As a hand-thrown grenade, the 7-8 second delay of the Type 91 proved too long in actual combat, enabling the enemy to pick up and throw the grenade back. To resolve this, the Type 97 fragmentation grenade was adopted for hand-thrown use.

In addition to a four-second delay, the Type 97 had no provisions for attaching a propellant base for firing by grenade projector. These changes prevented accidental usage in the latter roles while simplifying production.

When the Type 97 with its shortened delay came into production and was being delivered to front line combat units, the Japanese Army continued to use the older Type 91 grenades as hand-thrown weapons, in addition to rifle and grenade projector use.

Many of the Type 91 grenades were modified by shortening the fuse to a four to five second delay, drilling out the base, and welding small extensions on the body, so that it could not fit into the Type 10 or Type 89 grenade discharger, and painting the bottom white.

The resulting modified Type 91 was visually almost identical to the Type 97 except for its white base.

The Type 92 grenade was a chemical version of the Type 91. Two types of irritant/emetic fillings were used, Aka (red, diphenylcyanoarsine) or Midori (green, methylphenylketone chloride).

A Type 91 dummy grenade was created for training.

== Combat record ==
The Type 91 (modified) was issued as a standard hand grenade to Japanese infantrymen in the Second Sino-Japanese War and throughout the various campaigns of World War II.

== Users ==
- Empire of Japan
  - Imperial Japanese Army
  - Imperial Japanese Navy
    - Japanese Special Naval Landing Forces
