= Nambu-type training light machine gun =

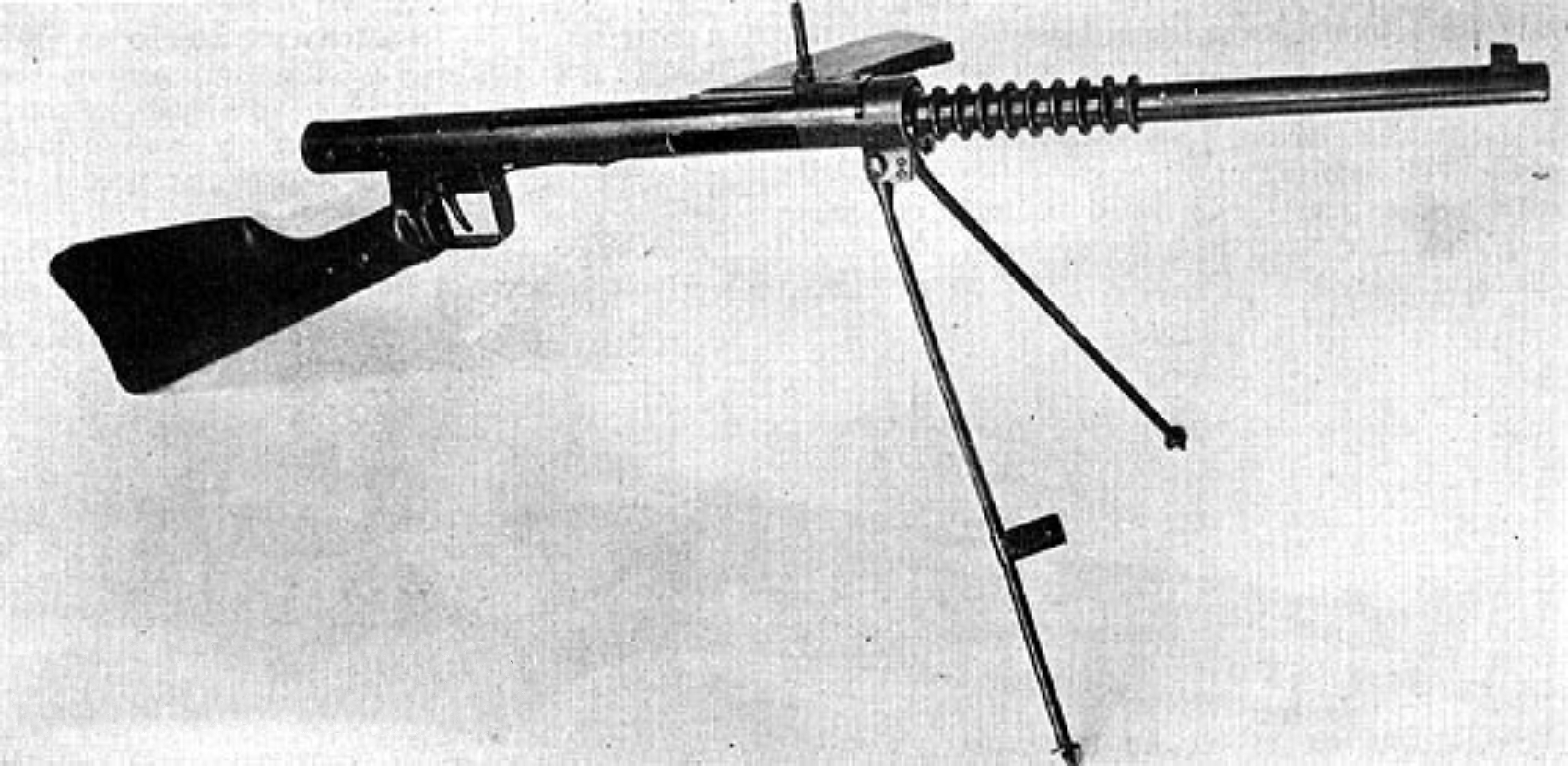
- Nambu-type training light machine gun
- Type: Training light machine gun
- Place of origin: Empire of Japan

Service history
- In service: 1920s-1945
- Used by: Imperial Japanese Army; Middle and high school military training programs

Production history
- Designer: Kijirō Nambu

Specifications
- Cartridge: 6.5mm blanks
- Action: Simple blowback
- Feed system: 15, 20, 30-round detachable box magazine

The Nambu-type training light machine gun (Japanese: 南部式訓練軽機関銃) was a Japanese blank-firing training light machine gun developed by the Nambu Arms Manufacturing Company (later reorganized as Chūō Kōgyō in 1936) for military training. It was widely used for training exercises until the end of World War II. Various other similar training light machine guns were also produced for military training.

== History ==
The Nambu-type training light machine gun was introduced near the end of the Taishō period. It was used in training alongside the Type 11 light machine gun, the Imperial Japanese Army's first light machine gun. While the Type 11 was gas-operated and used in actual combat, the Nambu-type was a low-cost simplified training version that also simplified arranging safe facilities for training. The Nambu-type was the first Japanese training light machine gun of its kind. It remained in use throughout Shōwa period until the end of World War II.

Beginning in 1935, as part of the Youth School Order, soldiers provided military education to middle schools, high schools, and vocational institutions. For young people who could not continue formal education, youth training institutes were introduced in factories, companies, and local communities. This initiative integrated military training into civilian schooling. In these programs, surplus Type 30 and Type 38 rifles were used to teach basic rifle handling and drill, while training light machine guns were employed for instruction in the handling and operation of light machine guns. These weapons were often acquired through martial arts equipment dealers, who acted as intermediaries.

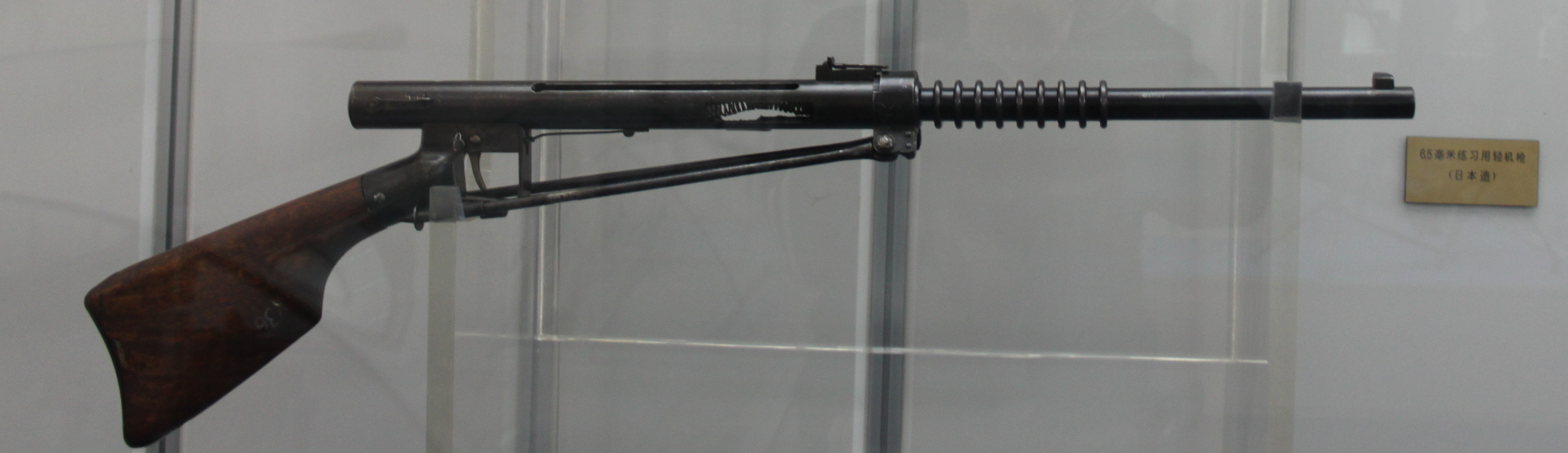
A Nambu-type training light machine gun at the Military Museum of the Chinese People's Revolution. (The stock is attached upside-down.)

After the war, Allied occupation forces confiscated Japanese weapons, including training machine guns. Some training weapons were mistaken for real firearms and destroyed. Their limited production numbers make them extremely rare today. Some surviving examples are found in museums and private collections.

== Training machine gun variants ==
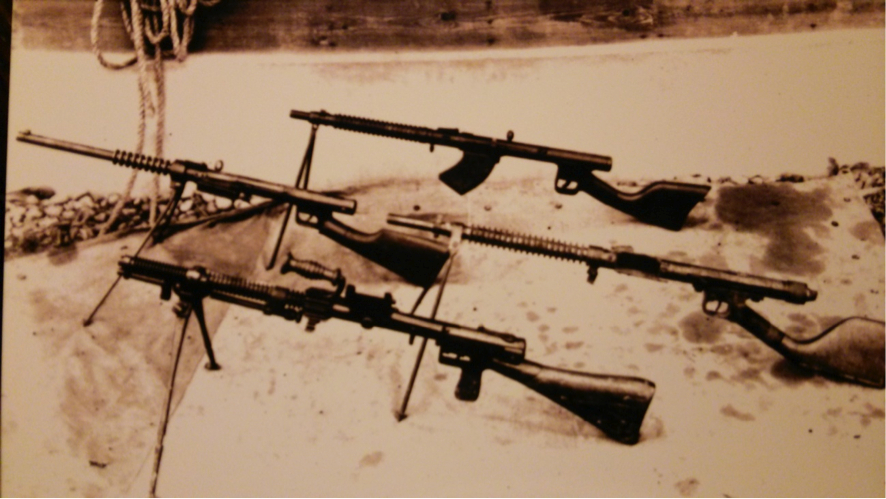
Four Japanese training light machine guns of different types, including a Nambu-type (left), confiscated by American authorities after the war.

Following the introduction of the Nambu-type, several other models of training light machine guns were also produced.

Variants:

- Kanayama-type training light machine gun (金山式訓練軽機関銃), produced by the Kanayama Kujiro Company (金山久次郎本店) in Toyohashi, Aichi
- Izawa-type training light machine gun (井澤式訓練軽機関銃), produced by Izawa Firearms Manufacturing (井澤銃砲製造所) in Tenmabashi, Kita, Osaka
- Nissho-type training light machine gun (日標式訓練軽機関銃)
- Sugimoto-type training light machine gun (杉本式訓練軽機関銃)
- Hyorinkan-type training light machine gun (兵林館, official designation unknown)

Other variants existed; in addition, some were made by various workshops and manufacturers on smaller scales.

The Izawa-type had a left-mounted magazine, whereas the Kanayama-type Type 96 style training light machine gun, featured a top-mounted magazine, mimicking the later Type 96 and Type 99 light machine guns. Around 2,000 Izawa-types and 1,600 Kanayama-types were reportedly manufactured. According to Kijirō Nambu, a Kanayama-type variant was an imitation of the Nambu-type, but since it was produced for military training purposes, no action was taken against it.

Several of these manufacturers also produced Type 38-style training rifles, some of which were so well-made that they were once exhibited at the Yūshūkan museum as real weapons. However, unlike genuine firearms, these training models had ejectors screwed into place.

== Design ==
The Nambu-type featured a simple design with a magazine mounted on the left side of the mechanism. Its grip was integrated with the stock, resembling the Type 11. Unlike real machine guns, training machine guns were designed solely for firing blanks and were incapable of firing live ammunition. They were based on a simple blowback mechanism and were typically constructed from cast metal components fastened together with screws.

They featured a smoothbore barrels, as rifling was unnecessary for weapons that only fired blank ammunition. They had wooden stocks, similar to standard infantry rifles, and incorporated cooling fins along the barrel to mimic the design of real gas-operated machine guns. All models were equipped with bipods, while some versions also included a mock gas cylinder and bayonet mount to simulate the full functionality of a real light machine gun. The magazines were single-stack and typically held 15, 20 or 30 rounds. These magazines were also made of cast metal, which made them nearly twice as thick as real Type 99 or Type 96 magazines, they weighed around 630g. They often featured a side opening, enabling safe removal of unfired blank cartridges. Despite their resemblance to real gas-operated firearms, they lacked a gas cylinder under the barrel. The Nambu-type had few parts and could be easily disassembled and reassembled like the Type 100 submachine gun.

Training machine guns fired wooden bullet blanks which included:

- 6.5mm blank cartridges designed for the Type 38 rifle
- Nambu blank cartridges – a cartridge modified to use Murata-style hunting primers, with a 0.5g of black hunting powder charge. Instead of a bullet, a 0.8mm thick, 13mm diameter round piece of thick paper was formed into a cup shape and pressed into the mouth of the case as a seal.

== See also ==
- List of machine guns
- Zf.Ger.38
