= Type 100 submachine gun =

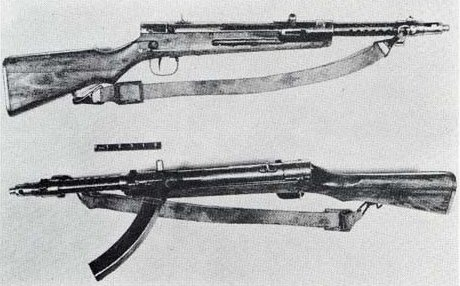
- Late model Type 100
- Type: Submachine gun
- Place of origin: Empire of Japan

Service history
- In service: 1942–1954
- Used by: Imperial Japanese Army; Imperial Japanese Navy
- Wars: World War II

Production history
- Designer: Kijiro Nambu
- Designed: 1939
- Manufacturer: Nagoya Arsenal
- Produced: 1942–1945
- No. built: ~8,500–10,000 (Note: ~1,000 early models (200 pre-production and 800 production models, of which 200 were converted into paratrooper models) and ~7,500 late models. Other sources give a number of ~1,000 early models and ~9,000 late models.)
- Variants: Type 100/40 (with solid stock); Type 100/40 (with folding stock); Type 100/44 (with solid stock)

Specifications
- Mass: 3.7 kg (8 lb 3 oz) (1942, empty); 4.2 kg (9 lb 4 oz) (1942, loaded); 3.8 kg (8 lb 6 oz) (1944, empty); 4.4 kg (9 lb 11 oz) (1944, loaded)
- Length: 890 mm (35 in) (1942); 900 mm (35.4 in) (1944)
- Barrel length: 228 mm (9 in) (1942); 230 mm (9 in) (1944)
- Cartridge: 8×22mm Nambu
- Caliber: 8mm
- Action: Blowback
- Rate of fire: 450 rounds per minute (1942); 800 rounds per minute (1944)
- Muzzle velocity: 335 m/s (1,099 ft/s)
- Effective firing range: 100–150 m (110–160 yd)
- Feed system: 30-round detachable curved box magazine

The Type 100 submachine gun (一〇〇式機関短銃, Hyaku-shiki kikan-tanjū) is a Japanese submachine gun used during World War II and the only submachine gun produced by Japan in any quantity. It was made in two basic variants referred to by American and British observers as the Type 100/40 and the Type 100/44, the latter also known as the Type 100 (simplified). A small number of the earlier version were converted into using folding stock, sometimes referred to by the Allies as the Type 100 navy, which was made for parachutists.

== Development ==
=== Prototypes ===
Japan was late in introducing the submachine gun to its armed forces. Although 445 models of the SIG Bergmann 1920 (a licensed version of the German MP 18) and some 6,000 Solothurn S1-100s were purchased from Switzerland and Austria in the 1920s and 1930s, and were used in the invasion of China in 1937, mass production of a native submachine gun did not begin until 1944. In the interim, Imperial Japan ordered 350 MAB 38/43 submachine guns from their Italian allies and they were delivered in 1943.

While the Western European imports were used, Japanese development of submachine guns had stalled. After earlier prototypes designed and built by the Nambu Arms Manufacturing Company, the Experimental Model 1 and Experimental Model 2 submachine guns, proved inadequate, new requirements were formulated in August 1937 by the Army. The new simpler design was based on the imported European "Bergmann type" submachine guns, which had been used effectively in both Battles of Shanghai by Japanese marines. This led to the development of the Experimental Model 3 submachine gun in 1938. The earliest version was known as Model 3A, but after some changes Model 3B was introduced in April 1939. It received generally positive results in testing and it was recommended to produce a batch of 200 weapons for military tests with infantry, cavalry, and reserve units. Further requirements were made for increased accuracy and a way to mount the standard Type 30 bayonet. A portion of the weapons for cavalry units were mounted with a bipod and a sight up to 1,500 meters to assess it capabilities in comparison with the bulky Type 11 light machine gun.

=== Early version ===
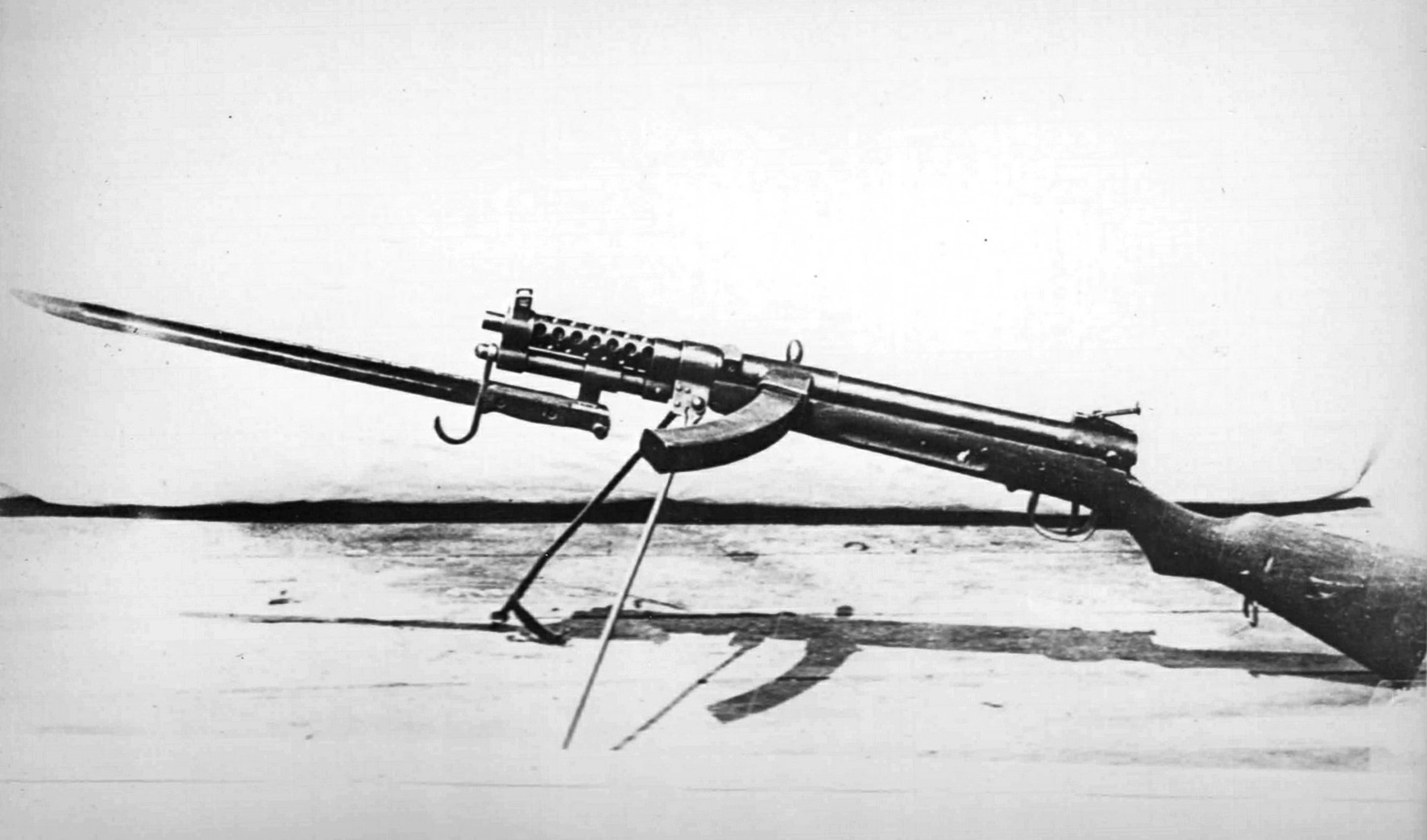
Early model Type 100 captured in Burma

In November 1939 came the release of the Type 3C, which included a double-slot muzzle brake. After almost full completion of the testing cycle of this version it was adopted by the Imperial Japanese Army in the summer of 1940 as the Type 100 submachine gun (known in western literature as the "Type 100/40"). However, no major order was made for the new weapon as the interest of the army had turned to the new 7.7 mm Type 99 light machine gun. There was no need for a "submachine gun" in the Imperial Army tactics. Under a low-priority military contract the Type 100 began to be deployed in August 1942, with numbers not exceeding 1,000 units, of which around 200 were converted to folding stock models for use by army paratroopers. These were converted (along with similar designs for Arisaka rifles) after trouble with weapons being dropped in bags separately from the paratroopers, such as in the Battle of Palembang, and were intended to be stored in a bag attached to the stomach of the jumper. The paratrooper version was referred to by the allies as the "Type 100 navy".

Limited numbers of the early Type 100 model were delivered to the Solomon Islands in late 1942 for military trials. A small batch was delivered to Guadalcanal, but the rest of the shipments were sunk before reaching their targets. A few very early models, without the muzzle brake, but with a bipod and a sight up to 1,500 meters (the "cavalry variant" of the Model 3B), were captured by the British in the late stages of the Burma campaign, brought in by Japanese reinforcements. Of the paratrooper variant, some were captured on Luzon during the Philippines campaign.

=== Late version ===
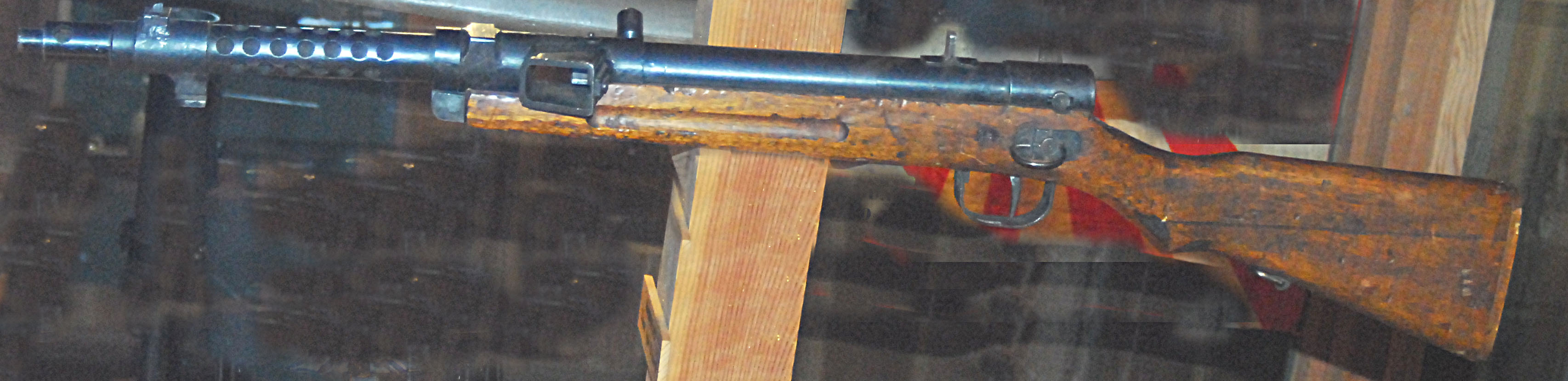
Late model Type 100 at the US Army Museum, Honolulu

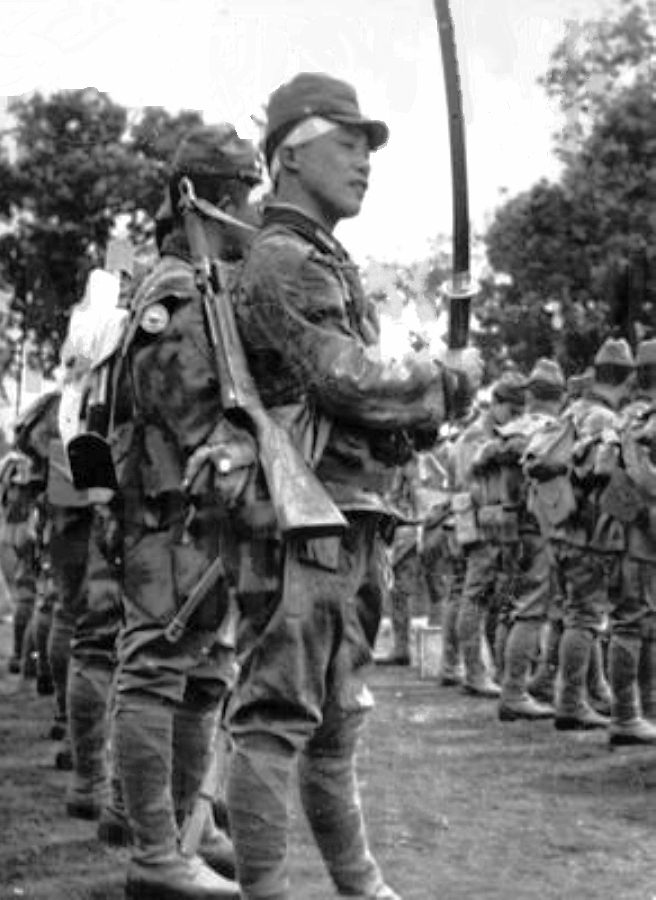
A Giretsu Kuteitai paratrooper armed with a Type 100 in Kengen Airfield, Kumamoto, May 1945

As the war continued, the demand for submachine guns increased greatly. In January 1944, under contract to the army, larger scale production of the Type 100 started. In connection with the lower quality "substitute standard" variants of other Japanese weapons to increase speed and reduce cost of manufacture, a number of changes were made to simplify the Type 100. This led to the later 1944 model of the Type 100, known in the west as the "Type 100/44". The 1944 variant was slightly longer, with simple iron sights and a greatly simplified muzzle brake consisting of two ports drilled in the barrel. The rear sights included a peep hole. The large bayonet mounting bar was eliminated, with the bayonet to be fitted to the barrel instead; consequently, the muzzle protruded more from its perforated jacket. Corners were cut in production, leaving many Type 100s with roughly finished stocks with roughly welded metal. The resulting weapon demonstrated good reliability with low recoil and satisfactory accuracy for close-range work. Some 7,500 were made produced in total.

According to Japanese historian Shigeo Sugawa, a small amount of early Type 100 models were produced by the Chuo Kogyo Company, while the late model was produced at the Nagoya Arsenal's Toriimatsu Factory from May 1944 until the end of the war, at a pace of approximately 1,000 per month. He estimates that the total number produced is about 10,000, nearly 9,000 of them being later models.

The later version Type 100s were used by special units of the Imperial Army and were encountered in the hands of paratrooper raiding units in the Philippines campaign and in the Battle of Okinawa, notably used by Giretsu Kuteitai airlifted special forces. After the war, a limited number was supplied by the American administration to arm the Japanese police.

== Users ==
- Japan
