= Blank-firing adapter =

Firearms safety device for projectile-less cartridges

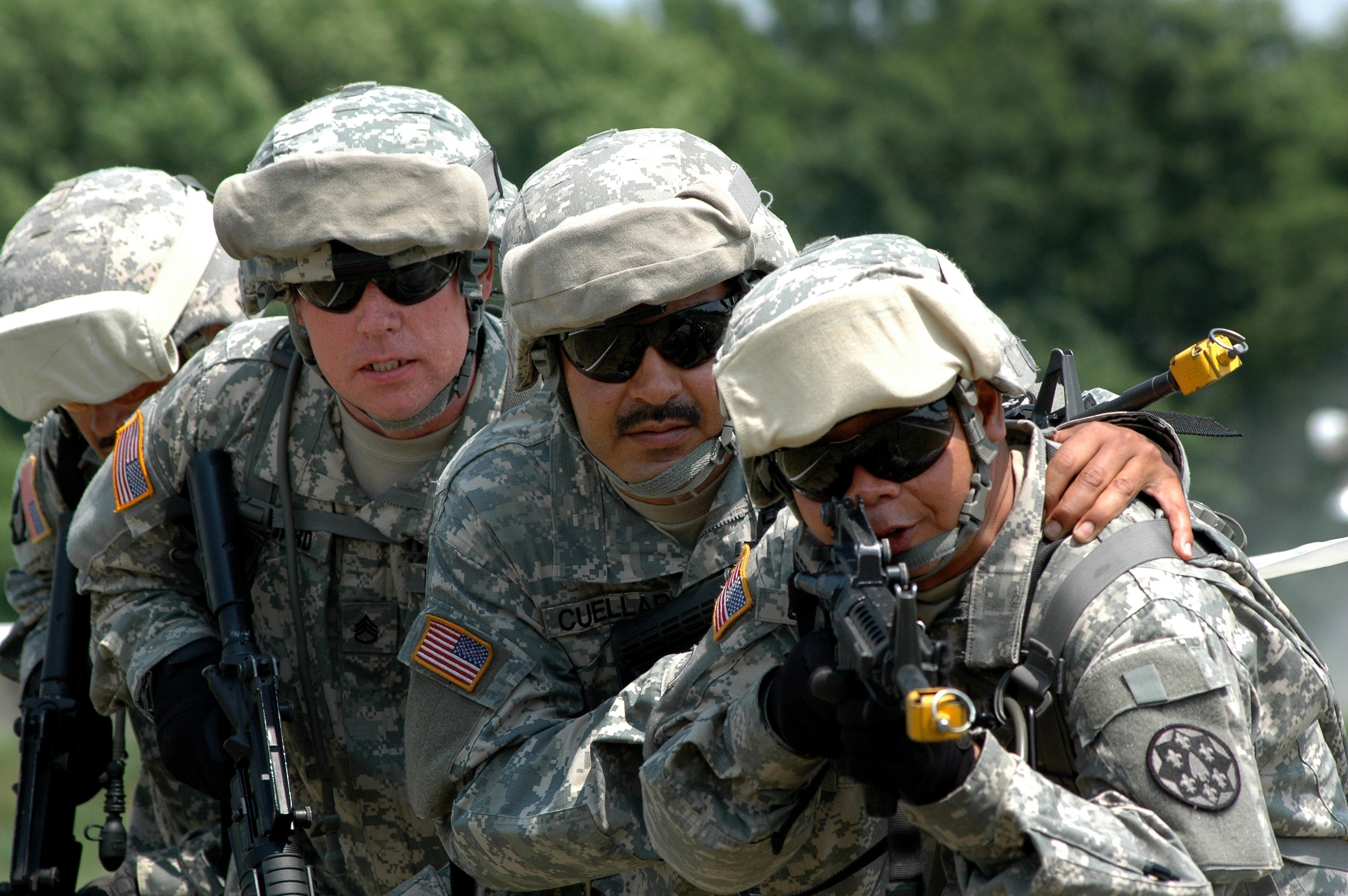
U.S. Army soldiers training with their M4 carbines fitted with bright yellow blank-firing adapters.

A blank-firing adapter or blank-firing attachment (BFA), sometimes called a blank adapter or blank attachment, is a device used in conjunction with blank ammunition for safety reasons, functional reasons, or both. Blank firing adapters are required for allowing blank ammunition to cycle the bolts of most semi-automatic and automatic firearms. It can also be a safety feature designed to break up the (wooden or plastic) plugs replacing the bullet in military blanks. This feature has the added benefit that a live round mistakenly fired will expend most of its energy upon colliding with the BFA, reducing both the range and damage inflicted, as well as divert the hot gases from a blank discharge out to the sides, reducing the risk of injury to the target of an aimed shot.

== Design ==
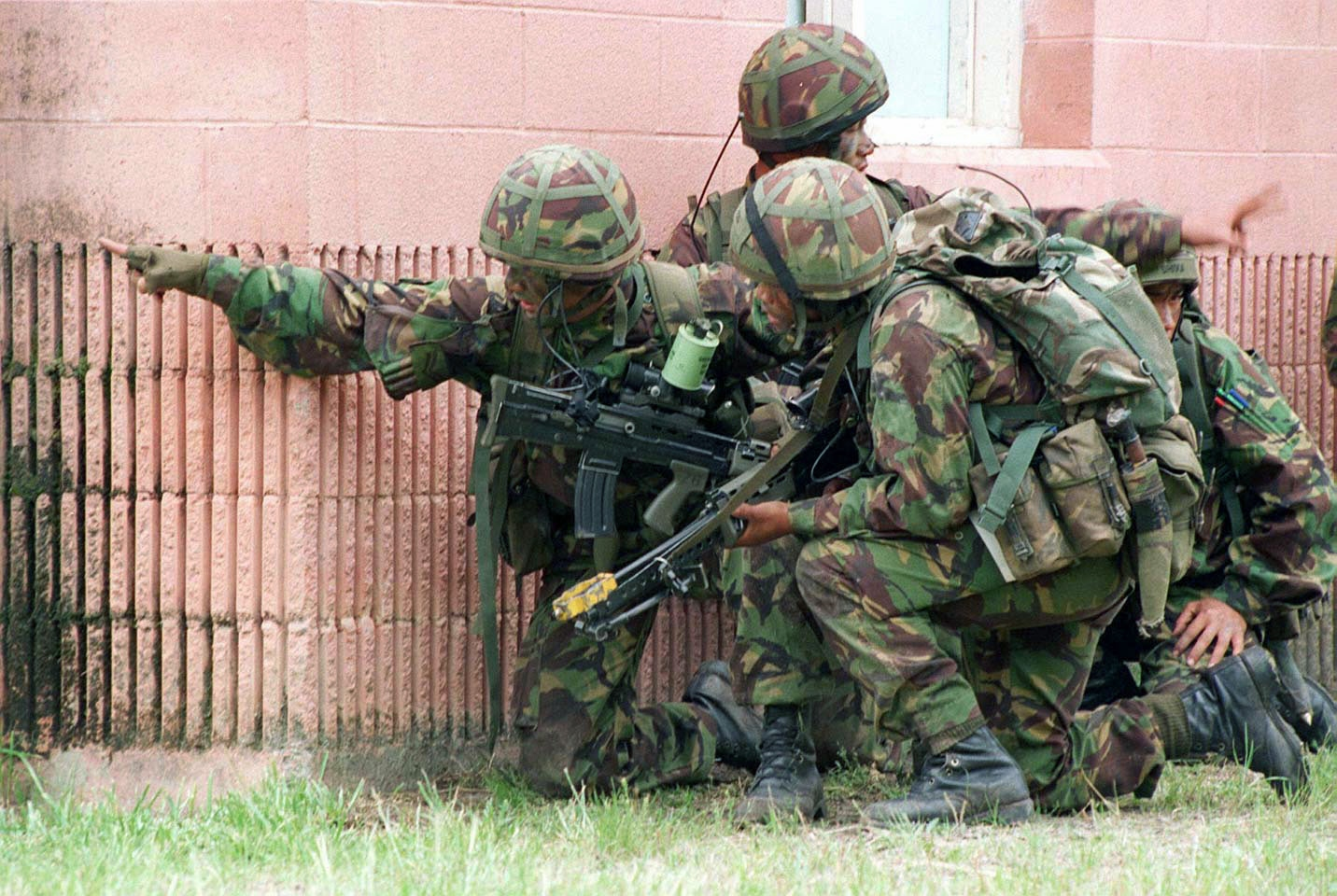
Soldiers of the Brigade of Gurkhas equipped with the L85 rifle and L86 LSW with yellow blank-firing attachment.

The design of the blank firing adapter depends on the intended use. Different designs are used for different firearm actions and different user needs. For military use, BFAs are made obvious in order that they can be seen to be fitted. In addition to its role in cycling the action of a weapon, the BFA also prevents debris from the blank round (and in some cases, inadvertently loaded live rounds) escaping. This debris could cause injury to nearby personnel if the BFA has not been fitted or has fallen off. Use in motion picture special effects, however, requires the BFA to be hidden from casual view, so as not to disturb the illusion of live ammunition being fired, a feat usually accomplished with replacement barrels, the diameter of which is significantly reduced just in front of the chamber.

=== Gas operated and blowback firearms ===
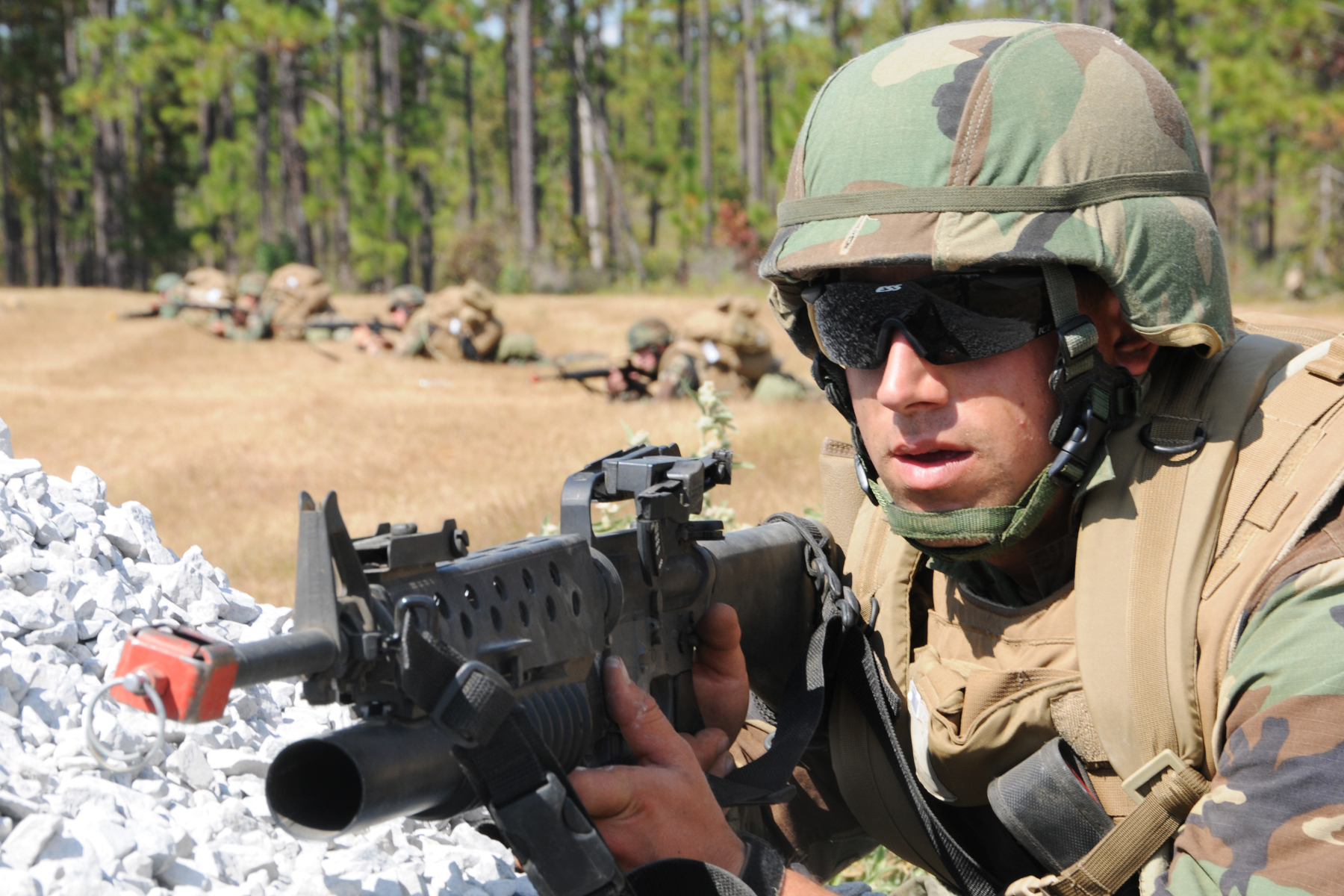
Blank firing adapter attached to an M16 rifle/M203

BFAs for blowback and gas-operated firearms are relatively simple. These weapons depend on high pressures in the chamber generated by the combustion of the propellant to push the breech block to the rear, allowing another round to be chambered and fired. If a blank round is used, there is no bullet to seal the barrel, and the combustion gases exit through the muzzle without building up enough pressure to rechamber the next round.

Simple BFAs for these firearms consist of a metal plug with screw threads. The adapter is attached to the muzzle of the firearm, and may attach to or replace the muzzle brake if there is one. A means is provided to allow some of the powder gases to escape. This can be adjustable, allowing it to regulate the amount of pressure used to rechamber the next round.

A drawback to the use of BFAs in gas-operated firearms is the amount of propellant residue that builds up in the barrel. Since only a limited amount of residue can escape (compared to when live ammunition is in use), the barrel can foul very quickly. Extreme care must be taken to ensure cleanliness of the barrel following BFA use to avoid damage to the weapon and injury to the operator due to barrel fouling.

Firearms with tapered bore barrels are more likely to function without BFA's using blank rounds as the pressure is congregated at the muzzle.

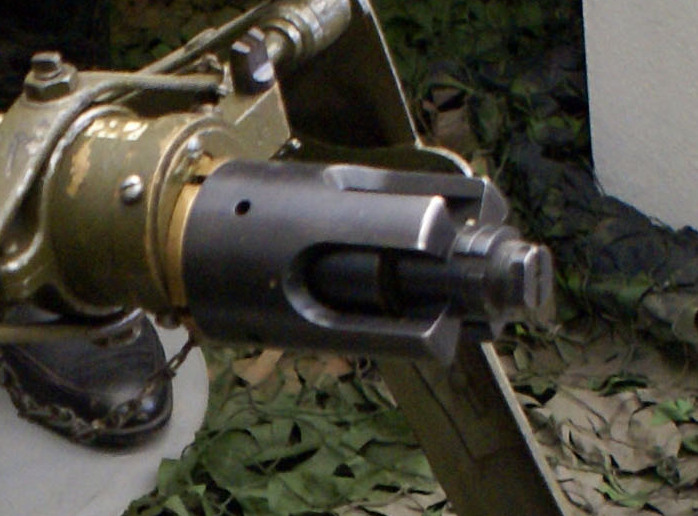
Close-up of a "blank-firing muzzle attachment" on a Swiss Maxim gun from 1890s

=== Recoil operated firearms ===
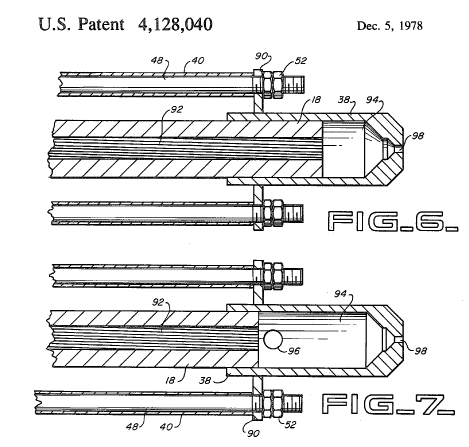
Drawings from US patent 4,128,040, for a blank firing adapter for the short recoil operated M2 Browning machine gun.

Since blank cartridges generate very little recoil, far less than that produced by a live round, the recoil operation mechanism is not suitable for use with blanks. BFAs used with recoil-operated firearms typically replace the locked breech of a recoil operated firearm with a simple blowback system using a restricted barrel, similar to a gas operated BFA. Short recoil operated pistols, the most common type used for self-defense and by police, are typically converted with a simple barrel replacement; the replacement barrel will lack the locking lugs to lock the slide to the frame, and will be built with an adjustable restrictor to control the chamber pressure. On designs with tilting barrels (again, the majority of modern designs are like this), there may also be a provision for tilting the barrel back, simulating the unlocking of the slide – this is visible in US Patent 5,585,589 listed below.

One notable exception to the design of BFAs for recoil operated firearms is machine guns based on short recoil designs, such as the German MG 34 and its descendants. These designs use a muzzle booster to add energy to the recoiling parts, and BFAs for these designs simply replace the muzzle booster with one that provides far more boost with blank cartridges. The M2 heavy machine gun, while it does not use a muzzle booster normally, can use a similar muzzle-booster-derived BFA.

== See also ==
- Weapons training
- Nambu-type training light machine gun
- Zf.Ger.38
