= Experimental Model 2 submachine gun =

Japanese submachine gun

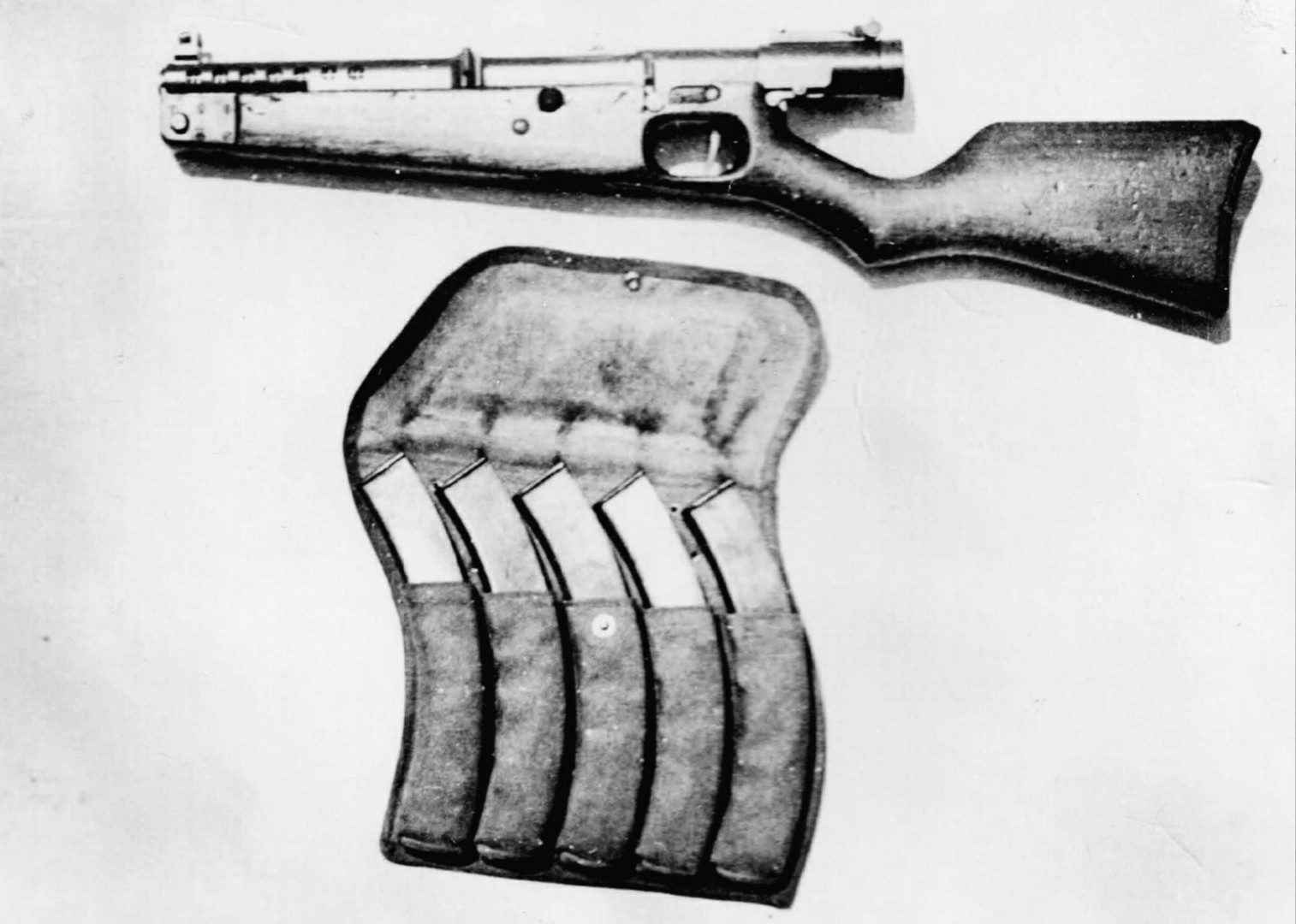
- Type: Submachine gun
- Place of origin: Empire of Japan

Service history
- In service: 1935–1945 (Japan)
- Used by: Imperial Japanese Army; People's Liberation Army
- Wars: Second Sino-Japanese War; World War II; Chinese Civil War; Korean War

Production history
- Designer: Shikanosuke Tokunaga; Kijiro Nambu
- Designed: 1935
- Manufacturer: Nambu
- No. built: 50–150
- Variants: Mukden Type 2

Specifications
- Mass: 3.37 kg (7 lb 7 oz) empty 4.39 kg (9 lb 11 oz) loaded
- Length: 896 mm (35 in)
- Barrel length: 228 mm (9 in)
- Cartridge: 8×22mm Nambu.45 ACP (Mukden Type 2)
- Caliber: 8 mm 11.5mm (Mukden Type 2)
- Action: Blowback
- Rate of fire: 600 rounds/min
- Feed system: 30 and 50 round box magazine
- Sights: Iron sights

The Experimental Model 2 submachine gun (試製二型機関短銃, Shisei-ni-gata kikan-tanjū) was a pre–World War II Japanese experimental submachine gun chambered in the 8mm Nambu round.

A reverse-engineered copy of the Type 2, chambered in .45 ACP and known as the Mukden Type 2, was produced and used in limited numbers by Communist Chinese forces during the Chinese Civil War and the Korean War.

== History ==
The Type 2 model was a development from the earlier Type 1 submachine gun, designed in response to criticisms of the former's awkward ergonomics. The new model offered a more conventional magazine feed and stock, but wholly retained the Type 1's method of operation and was essentially the same gun in a different body. It was initially produced in the mid-1930s, tested by the Imperial Japanese Army, but got rejected.

During World War II, an urgent demand for automatic infantry weapons saw the revival of several experimental weapon projects, including the Type 2 submachine gun. Blueprints of the weapon were sent to the Mukden Arsenal in Manchukuo in 1944 for use in development of cheap submachine guns. However, those blueprints were used by the Chinese communists to produce submachine guns that were later used in the Chinese Civil War which followed the end of the war with Japan and communist control over Mukden. These weapons were operationally identical but chambered in .45 ACP rather than 8×22mm Nambu.

The British and US armies studied examples of the earlier Japanese prototypes obtained in Singapore and Japan after the surrender of Japan in the war. There is at least one surviving example of the Type 2 at the Army Ordnance Museum, previously located at the Aberdeen Proving Ground.

== Design details ==
The Type 2 was a blowback-operated submachine gun that fired from an open bolt. Much like the Type 1, the Type 2's return spring enveloped the barrel of the gun rather than behind the bolt. The front section of the receiver and barrel shroud would travel forward with the bolt upon firing and be pushed back by the return spring. The barrel stayed stationary. The cocking handle was not located in a slotted groove but instead took the form of a protruding tab fixed to the left side of the receiver.

Early pre-war prototypes of the Type 2 were built with the same pneumatic buffer device seen on the Type 1, which cushioned the action of the gun and acted as a bolt delay. The timing of the delay could be adjusted by changing the air pressure exerted by the buffer, thus lowering or increasing the fire rate to either 500 or 600 rounds per minute, but the examples captured after the war had five buffer holes as settings. This was done by turning a pressure valve located underneath the rear cap. The later wartime models omitted the air buffer feature in an attempt to cut production costs. The Type 2 was typically issued with 30-round magazines, although it could also use the same 50-round magazines just like the Type 1.

Late-war examples of the Type 2 had bayonet fittings, a feature not present on the original production models. A spike bayonet was also designed for the gun but was not used on the production models. The finish of the late-war models was typically poor compared to the earlier pre-war prototypes.

=== 1934 Model 2A ===
Version chambered in the more powerful Type 95 6.5x30mm cartridge, it weighed 7-7,5 grams and generated muzzle velocities between 550 and 600 m/s resulting in muzzle energy between 1058.75 and 1350 J.

=== 1942 Model 2A ===
Version chambered in 8×22mm Nambu.

=== Mukden Type 2 ===
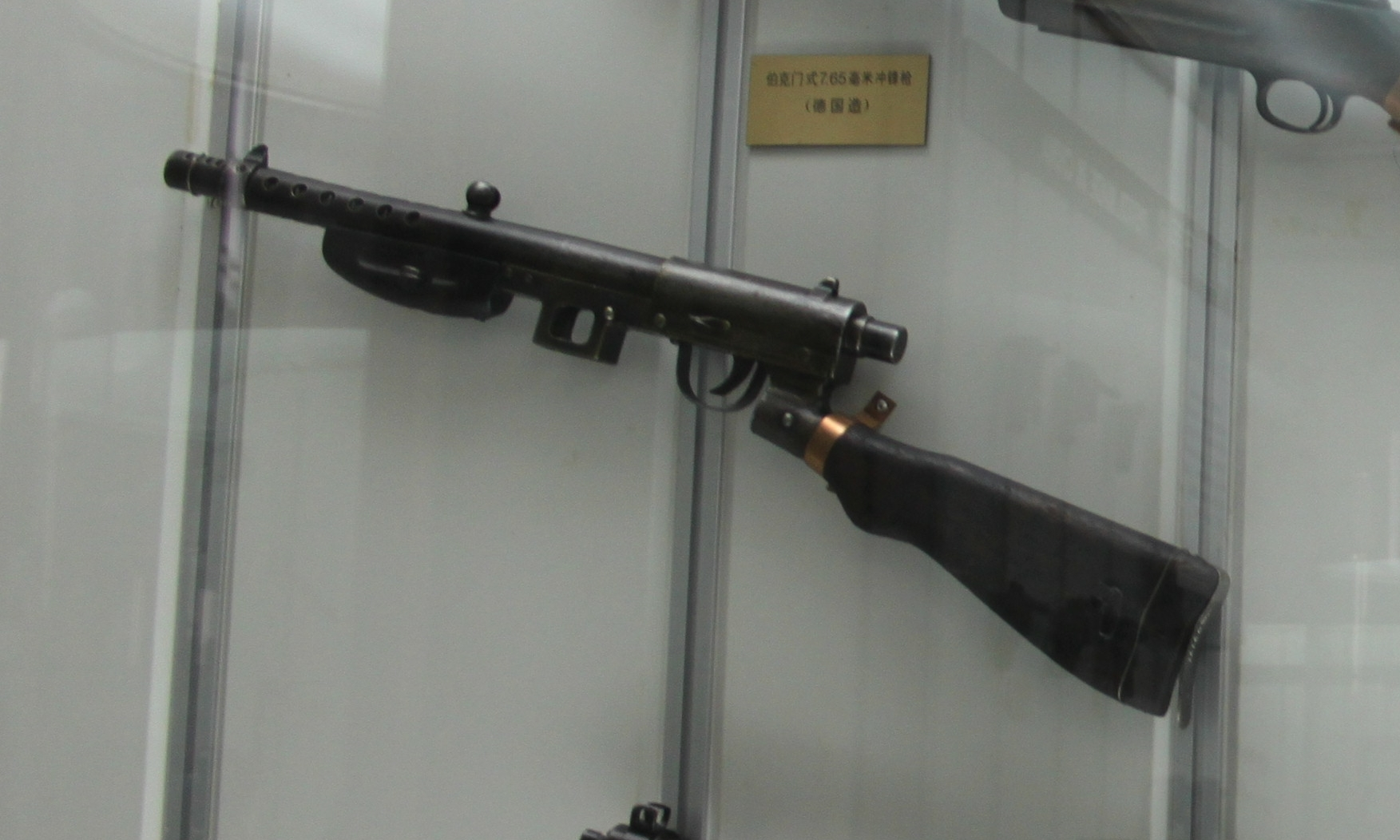
A Mukden Type 2 in the Military Museum of the Chinese People's Revolution

A variant developed by Chinese communist forces using blueprints originally sent to the Mukden Arsenal in Manchukuo in 1944. Adapted to chamber .45 ACP instead of 8×22mm Nambu and used in the Chinese Civil War. The Mukden Type 2 was also used in limited numbers by the Chinese People's Volunteer Army during the Korean War, several examples were captured by American forces. It is sometimes referred to generically as the Chinese .45 (11.43 mm) submachine gun.

Mechanically, the Mukden Type 2 was based on the Japanese Model 2A. It shares several unconventional design elements, the bolt is enclosed and pinned to a barrel jacket that extends from the receiver, which made the bolt and barrel jacket function as a single moving unit that reoiled together with the receiver frame, a configuration that increases the bolt weight, which is necessary for the safe operation of a straight blowback system. The receiver frame also houses a buffer assembly that consisted of a plunger, heavy coil spring and retaining cap. This entire assembly is cocked using a bolt handle on top of the barrel jacket. There were also several superficial design differences to the Model 2A, such as a different stock, foreend, and bolt handle design. It had an inverted "V" blade front sight and a fixed rear aperture sight. It had a fire rate of 500 rounds per minute and generated a muzzle velocity of approximately 920 ft/s.

== See also ==
- List of submachine guns
- List of World War II infantry weapons
- List of Japanese military equipment of World War II
