= Type 99 light machine gun =

Light machine gun

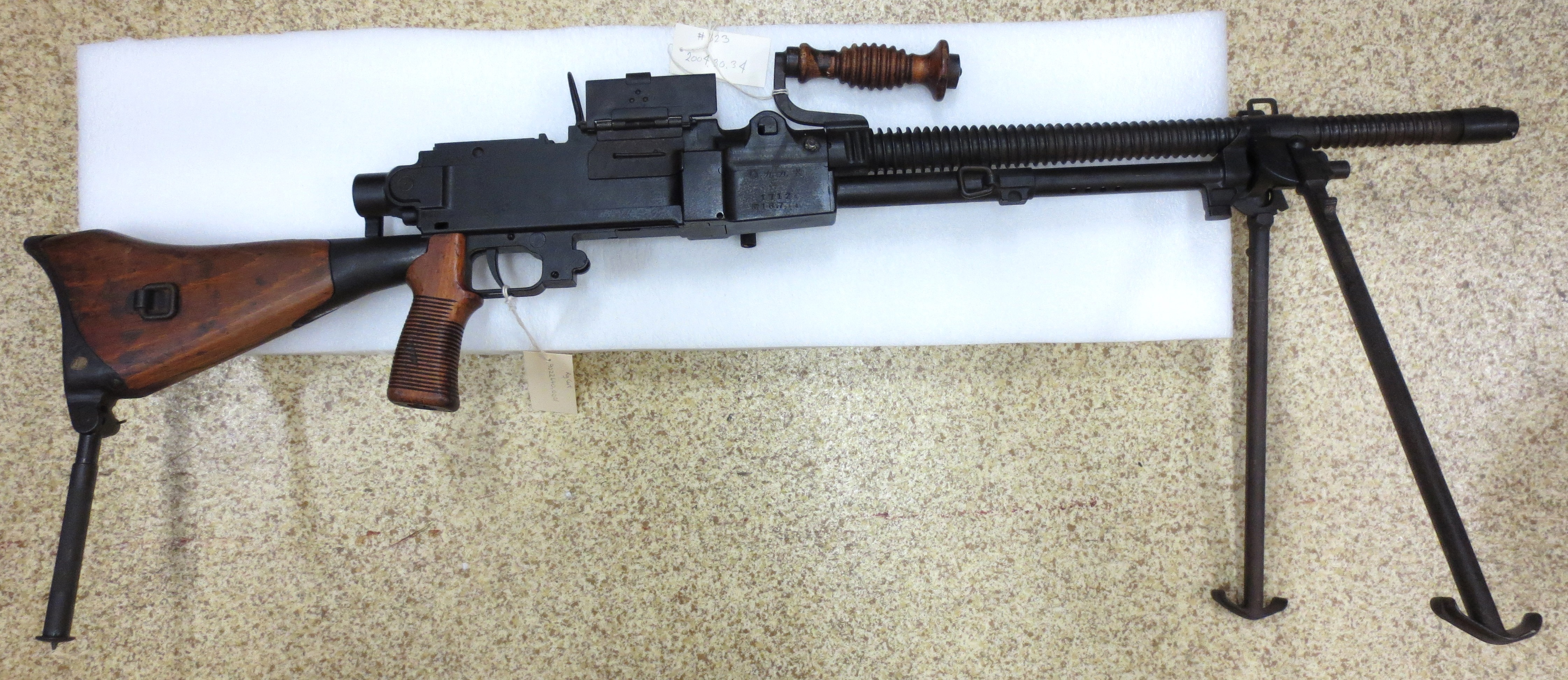
- Type 99 light machine gun seen at the New Brunswick Museum, Saint John, New Brunswick, Canada.
- Type: Light machine gun
- Place of origin: Empire of Japan

Service history
- In service: 1939–1945
- Used by: See Users
- Wars: Second Sino-Japanese War; World War II; Indonesian National Revolution; Hukbalahap Rebellion; Korean War; Chinese Civil War; First Indochina War; Vietnam War

Production history
- Designer: Kijiro Nambu
- Designed: 1939
- Manufacturer: Nambu Arms Manufacturing Company; Kokura Arsenal; Nagoya Arsenal
- Unit cost: 1,350 yen ($316 USD) in December 1941
- Produced: 1939–1945
- No. built: 53,000

Specifications
- Mass: 10.4 kg (22.9 lbs)
- Length: 1181 mm (46.5 in)
- Barrel length: 550 mm (21.7 in)
- Cartridge: 7.7×58mm Arisaka
- Action: Gas-operated
- Rate of fire: 550 rounds/min (Japanese Army data); 800 rounds /min (U.S. survey data)
- Muzzle velocity: 2,346 feet per second (715 m/s)
- Effective firing range: 2,000 m (2,200 yd)
- Maximum firing range: 3,500 m (3,800 yd) (7.7×58mm Arisaka)
- Feed system: 30-round detachable box magazine

The Type 99 light machine gun (九九式軽機関銃, Kyūkyū-shiki Kei-kikanjū) is a light machine gun used by the Imperial Japanese Army in World War II. It was similar in design to the earlier Type 96 light machine gun, but designed to fire the new and more powerful 7.7×58mm Arisaka cartridge, which improved energy by over 50%. Other improvements included the omission of the oiling mechanism which resulted in a better all-round weapon. The Type 99 never fully replaced the previous models of Japanese light machine guns, and served alongside the Type 11 and Type 96 until 1945.

== History and development ==
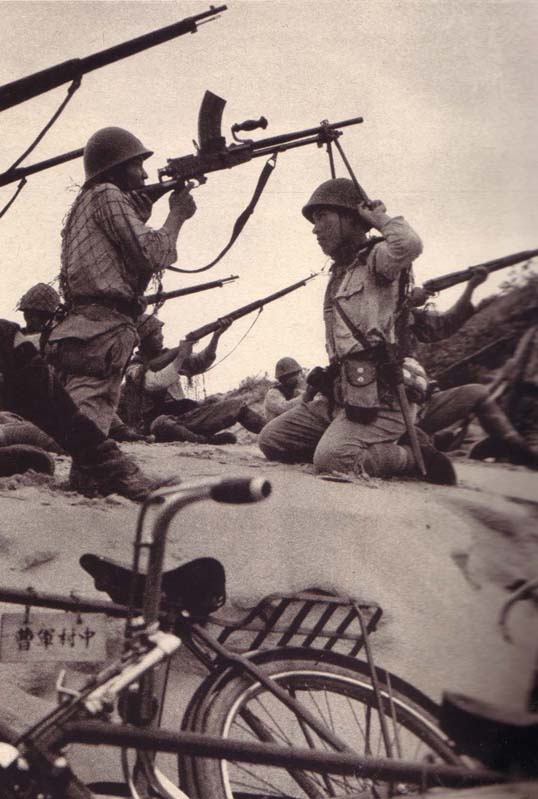
Japanese soldier using his comrade as an anti-aircraft bipod for his Type 99

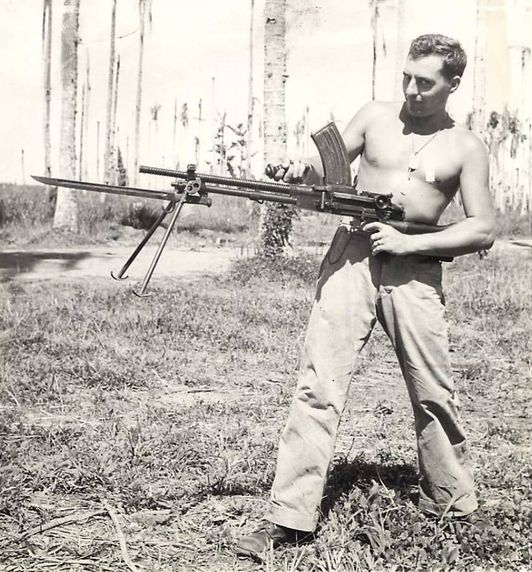
US Marine posing with a captured Type 99 with bayonet

Prior to the Type 99's development, the Japanese Army was using the Type 96 light machine gun, a successor to the previous Type 11 light machine gun. The Type 96 had been introduced into combat service in 1936, and quickly proved to be a versatile weapon to provide covering fire for advancing infantry. Both the Type 11 and Type 96 used the same 6.5x50mmSR Arisaka cartridges as the Type 38 infantry rifle. Using similar ammunition in both guns simplified supply and had the added advantage that any squad member could supply ammunition for the light machine gun, or vice versa.

However, in 1939 the Japanese army was in the process of switching to a larger and more powerful 7.7mm cartridge which also had no rim, which improved handling. This more powerful cartridge: 3,136 J energy, compared to the earlier 6.5x50mmSR Arisaka cartridge: 1,966 J energy, required a firearm that had more steel, bigger springs and a heavier bolt to handle the extra forces involved. This required a switch from the Type 38 rifle to the Type 99 rifle which could handle the more powerful round. Similarly, it was necessary to develop a new version of the Type 96 light machine gun that would also be able to use this new larger caliber; thus the advantages of common ammunition between riflemen and machine gunners could continue. The Type 99 light machine gun was produced at Kokura, Nagoya Arsenal, and Mukden with a total production of about 53,000 weapons.

== Design ==
The Type 99 was basically the same design as the Type 96, and had a number of parts in common. However, it dispensed with the oiler and had better primary extraction, increasing reliability over its predecessors. Early models had a monopod at the stock and a flash suppressor on the muzzle, which was screwed onto a threaded portion of the gun barrel. A top-mounted curved detachable box magazine with a round counter held 30 rounds, and the finned barrel could be rapidly changed to avoid overheating. Like the Type 96, the Type 99 bears a distinct resemblance to the British Bren gun.

The Type 99 had a blade front sight and a leaf rear sight, with graduations from 200 to 1,500 meters, with a wind adjustment. A 2.5X telescopic sight with a 10 degree field of view could be attached at the right side of the gun. These were often issued to the best marksmen of the unit and occasionally employed like a sniper rifle. A standard infantry bayonet could be attached to the gas block below the barrel, but on the battlefield this feature proved inconsequential due to the weight of the gun and the fact that the blade was largely obstructed by the flash hider when it was fixed on the muzzle.

== Combat record ==
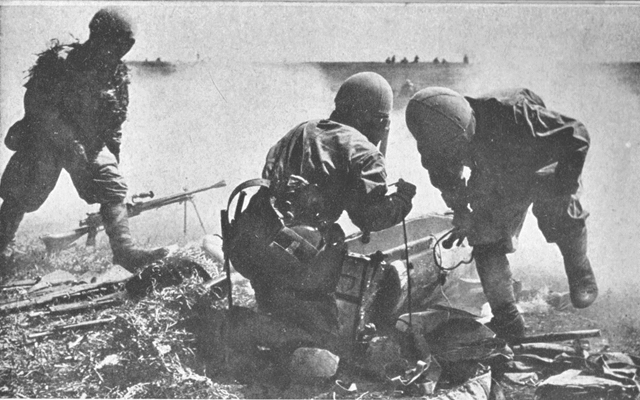
IJA paratroopers armed with the Type 99 during the Battle of Palembang

The Type 99 came into active service in 1939, and was used alongside the Type 11 and Type 96, as these models had been produced in large quantities and many front line troops continued to use the Type 38 rifles with their 6.5 mm ammunition. All three weapons remained in service until the end of the war. The Type 99 was used by communist forces (Chinese and North Korean armies) during the Korean War. It was used by the Viet Minh and the North Vietnamese forces during the First and Second Indochina Wars.

== Variants ==
A limited production version of the Type 99 was produced for paratroopers, but had no known special designation. It had a detachable stock and a forward-folding pistol grip. For deployment, the barrel and butt were detached from the gun, the pistol grip and bipod folded, and the entire set packed into a carrying bag.

The Type 99 can be modified to fire 7.62×51mm NATO ammunition. Only a barrel replacement is required.

The first prototype of the Type 62 GPMG was completed in October 1956. The appearance of the prototype at that time was very similar to the Type 99 light machine gun, with a flash hider and a forward-facing carrying handle like the Type 99 LMG, and was like a Type 99 modified to belt-feed 30-06 (7.62x63 mm round) specifications. Afterwards, it was changed to 7.62x51mm NATO ammunition specifications (7.62x51mm round), and several prototypes were made, including the NITTOKU Type 14 in 1958 and Type 15 in 1960, and after various tests, it was provisionally adopted as the Type 62 7.62mm machine gun in 1962 (see ja:62式7.62mm機関銃#開発).

== Users ==
- Indonesia
- Japan
- North Korea − Limited use by the Worker-Peasant Red Guards as late as 1980
- Vietnam

== See also ==
- Type 97 light machine gun
