= Type 94 Nambu pistol =

Nambu Type 94 pistol
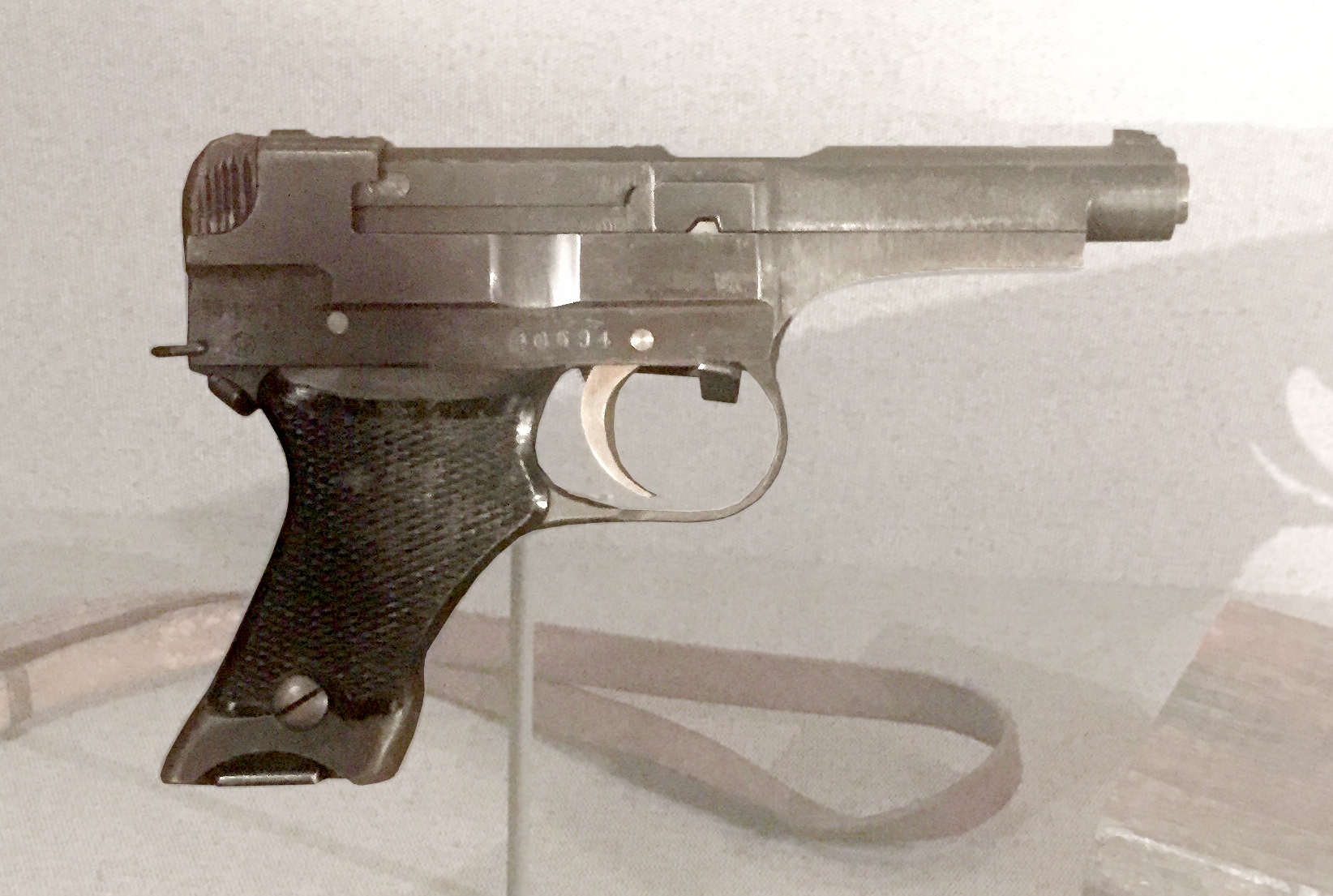
- Type 94 Pistol
- Type: Semi-automatic pistol
- Place of origin: Empire of Japan

Service history
- In service: 1935–1945
- Used by: Japan
- Wars: Second Sino-Japanese War; World War II; Chinese Civil War

Production history
- Designer: Kijiro Nambu
- Designed: 1929
- Manufacturer: Nambu Rifle Manufacturing Company
- Produced: 1935–1945
- No. built: 71,000

Specifications
- Mass: 765 g (1 lb 11oz)
- Length: 187 mm (7.36 in)
- Barrel length: 96 mm (3.78 in)
- Height: 199 mm (4.69 in)
- Cartridge: 8x22mm Nambu
- Action: Recoil operated, locked breech
- Muzzle velocity: 305 m/s (1000 ft/s)
- Feed system: 6 round detachable box magazine
- Sights: Front blade, rear fixed V

The Type 94 Nambu 8 mm pistol (Type 94 handgun, in Japanese: 九四式拳銃, romanized: Kyūyon-Shiki Kenjū) is a semiautomatic pistol developed by Kijirō Nambu and his associates for the Imperial Japanese Army. Development of the Type 94 pistol began in 1929, and after several redesigns the final prototype was tested and officially adopted by the Japanese army in late 1934 (Japanese calendar, 2594). The Type 94 pistol entered production in 1935. Approximately 71,000 pistols were manufactured before production ended in 1945.

The Type 94 pistol was designed for (and popular among) Japanese tank and aircraft crews who preferred a smaller, lightweight design. Japanese weapons experts have subsequently criticized some design elements of the Type 94; in particular the pistol can be fired unintentionally before the breech was fully locked if the sear bar on the side of the receiver is depressed while the pistol's safety is disengaged. Additionally, the process to disassemble the pistol is overly complex and awkward. The build quality of the Type 94 pistol declined over its production run; "last ditch" pistols made in 1945 were crudely manufactured.

== History ==
The Type 94 Nambu pistol was designed by Kijiro Nambu after he retired from the Japanese army and founded the Nambu Rifle Manufacturing Company. Design of the Type 94 Nambu pistol commenced in 1929 with the goal of reducing the bulk and price of previous Nambu designs. The Imperial Japanese Army felt a smaller pistol of domestic design that could accommodate the standard 8×22mm Nambu cartridge was needed to substitute the larger, heavier, and only official military pistol, the Nambu pistol (Type 14). The demand for officer's handguns had increased as a result of Japan's invasion of Manchuria during the Second Sino-Japanese War. A new design was also wanted by the Japanese Army to include a magazine safety, to prevent unintentional discharges during cleaning that were common among Japanese personnel. Naming of the Type 94 pistol reflects the change in Japanese nomenclature with the 94 reckoning back to the mythical foundation of Japan in 660 BC, therefore year 2594 instead of the traditional emperor reign period used to name the Type 26 revolver or Type 14 Nambu pistol. The final prototype for the Type 94 was officially adopted by the Japanese Army in late 1934 after several redesigns. Production began under the supervision of the Nagoya Army Arsenal at the Nambu Rifle Manufacturing Company and later its successor, Chuo Kogyo Company, Ltd. Priced at 73 yen per unit, an estimated 71,000 pistols were produced for the military but the exact quantity is unknown because of the production of unserialized pistols and undated pistols. During World War II the pistol became a preferred weapon for tank crews and paratroopers who required a smaller, more convenient pistol. The Type 94 was never officially adopted by the Imperial Japanese Navy but was available to officers through the Japanese officers' union.

== Design ==
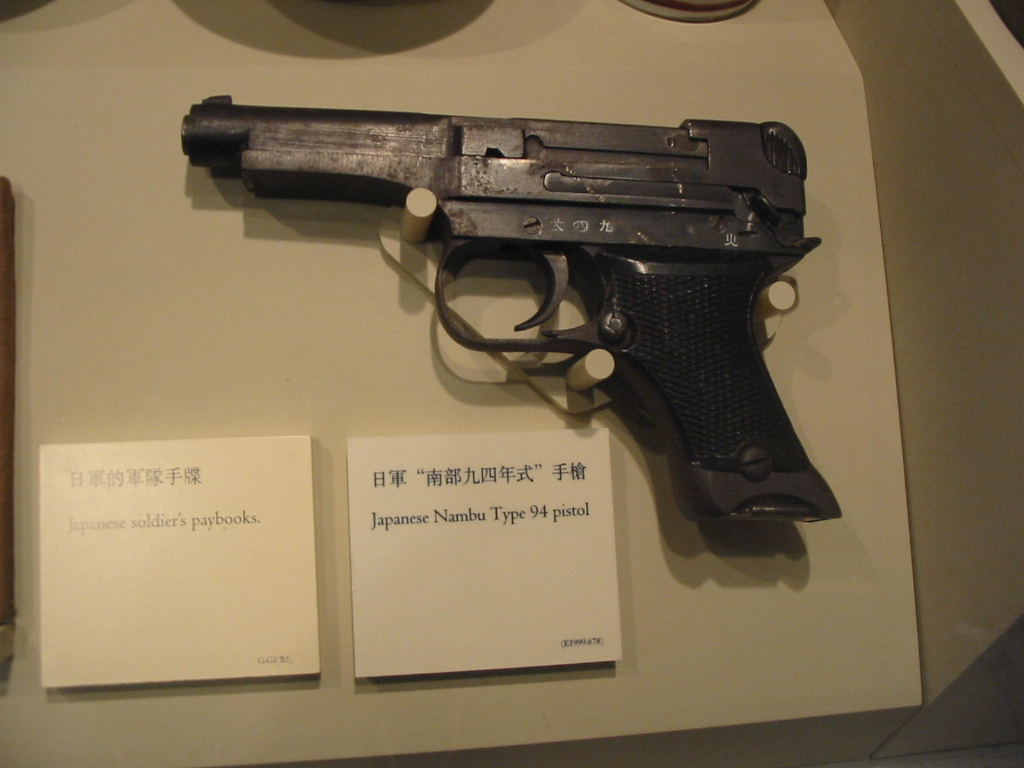
A Type 94 pistol from the HK Museum of History

The Type 94 pistol is operated by a different mechanism than previous Japanese sidearms. Unlike previously designed Nambu pistols, the Type 94 operates with a concealed hammer and with a firing pin rather than a striker. According to authors, Harry L. Derby and James D. Brown, the firing pin is inherently weak and is prone to breakage because of a recess cut provided for the crossbolt and is prone to breaking at this point. The sturdier hammer firing mechanism was developed and included in the Type 94 to replace the poor striker on the Type 14 Nambu. The locking system is a rising-block type which floats independently between the lugs underneath the chamber end of the barrel. The single coil mainspring is positioned around the barrel instead of to the rear of the barrel as found on other Nambu pistols. The grip is smaller than other Japanese pistols and is finished with either black bakelite or smooth wood, depending on production date. According to author Jeff Kinard, these smaller grips are more comfortable for use by men with smaller hands. The magazine holds a maximum of six rounds because of the smaller grip and it is considered difficult to reload the weapon, with pressure from the bolt holding it inside the pistol. The magazine catch protrudes far enough to occasionally disengage when the pistol is placed on its left side on a hard surface. The magazine could also disengage if squeezed into or jarred in a holster. The manual safety lever is located on the left rear of the frame and has the kanji for "fire" and "safe" stamped onto the frame. The front blade sight on the muzzle of the Type 94 pistol and the rear fixed V were occasionally inaccurately positioned making them useless when the weapon is being aimed. The rear sight was reduced from a U-shape to a simple notch in 1944 with the front blade being left unchanged but less attention to detail being applied as World War II progressed.

=== Final production ===
The quality of Type 94 Nambu pistols decreased towards the end of World War II as the Japanese faced bombing raids from Allied forces and material shortages increased. This drastic change in quality from late March 1945, onwards with all quality standards appearing to disappear towards the end of June 1945. As bakelite became increasingly unavailable, the earlier bakelite grips were replaced with smooth wooden grips, often called "slab" grips. Many pistols were not serialized and no pistols have been reported that bear July 1945 manufacture date. Only four unserialized and undated pistols are known to exist and include mismatched parts with no inspection marks, lanyard loops, and extractors. A small number of pistols made during the final production stages include earlier production dates and appear to have been salvaged from previously discarded pistols that had minor or cosmetic defects.

== Disassembly ==
Disassembly of the Type 94 Nambu pistol is considered difficult and can lead to damage to the pistol if done carelessly. After clearing the Type 94, the operator must draw the slide against the magazine follower to hold the bolt to the rear of the pistol. This allows the crossbolt to be released after the firing pin is depressed. Removal of the crossbolt without depressing the firing pin will damage both the firing pin and the crossbolt. Removing the crossbolt is further complicated as the disassembler's hands are both holding the pistol and depressing the firing pin.

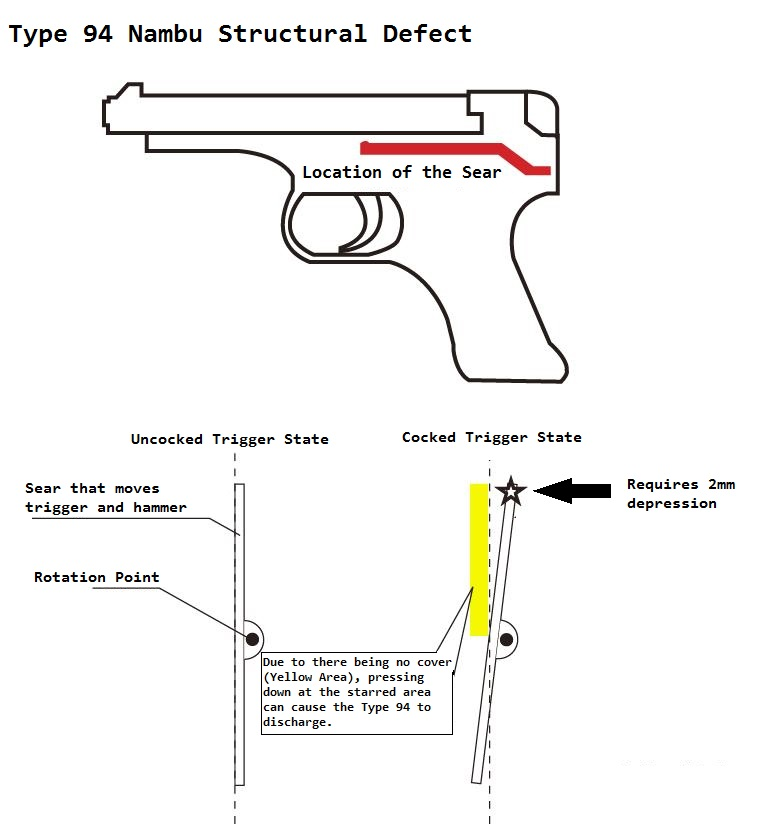
Diagram showing the location of the sear bar that can be jarred loose and cause a misfire

== Holster ==
Holsters for the Type 94 pistol were generally made from either pigskin or cowhide leather and ranged in color from tan to dark reddish brown. Holsters faced the same degradation in quality as the Type 94 pistol. As supplies of leather were exhausted in Japan, holsters manufactured in 1944 became fabricated from olive drab fabric. The Type 94 pistol holster is distinguishable from other Japanese holsters having a pointed closure flap and a vertically positioned magazine pouch. The pouch tow has a narrow extension to accommodate a cleaning rod. The majority of holsters were made in civilian owned tanneries with some ink stamped with arsenal and inspection marks. A belt loop and two shoulder strap "D" rings are provided on the rear of the holster and are made from brass, galvanized steel, or nickel plating.

== Unintentional firing ==
The design of the breech allows the Type 94 Nambu to be fired unintentionally. The sear bar on the Type 94 Nambu converts the forward pull of the trigger into a lateral movement that frees the hammer. Because the sear bar is on the outside of the pistol, it can be accidentally discharged if the pistol is cocked and handled carelessly. The forward end of the sear bar needs to be depressed approximately 2 mm (0.079 in) to cause the weapon to fire. However the sear bar cannot be depressed to cause an unintentional discharge while the safety is engaged. The ability to fire the Type 94 without pulling the trigger gave rise to war stories of Japanese soldiers surrendering, only to fire the pistol, earning the pistol monikers such as the "suicide special" and the "surrender pistol". These stories are widely discredited because of the difficulty to fire the weapon by squeezing the sear bar. Jonathan Ferguson adds that a soldier feigning surrender would need to hold the gun in a conspicuous way. If the safety is engaged on the Type 94 it is impossible for the weapon to discharge unintentionally.
