= 8×22mm Nambu =

Pistol cartridge designed by Kijiro Nambu

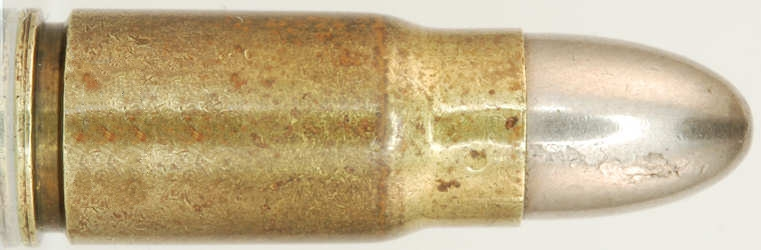
- Japanese military pistol cartridge.
- Type: Pistol
- Place of origin: Japan

Service history
- In service: 1904–1945
- Used by: Japan, others (post WW2)
- Wars: Russo-Japanese War; World War I Pacific War; Second Sino-Japanese War; Indonesian National Revolution; Chinese Civil War; Hukbalahap Rebellion; Korean War; First Indochina War; Vietnam War (limited)

Production history
- Designer: Kijirō Nambu
- Designed: 1902

Specifications
- Case type: Bottleneck, semi-rimmed
- Bullet diameter: 8.13 mm (0.320 in)
- Neck diameter: 8.71 mm (0.343 in)
- Shoulder diameter: 10.00 mm (0.394 in)
- Base diameter: 10.23 mm (0.403 in)
- Rim diameter: 10.50 mm (0.413 in)
- Rim thickness: 0.92 mm (0.036 in)
- Case length: 21.43 mm (0.844 in)
- Overall length: 31.56 mm (1.243 in)
- Primer type: Small pistol

Ballistic performance
Bullet mass/type	Velocity	Energy
6.6 g (102 gr) FMJ	315 m/s (1,030 ft/s)	328 J (242 ft⋅lbf)
- Test barrel length: 117 mm (4.61 in)

The 8×22mm Nambu is a rimless, bottleneck handgun cartridge introduced in Imperial Japan in 1904, used in the Type 100 submachine gun, Nambu pistols (Type A, the Type B and Type 14) and the Nambu Type 94 pistol.

== Origins ==
Towards the end of the 19th century, certain semi-automatic pistol designs began to see production, such as the Borchardt C-93 and Mauser C96. Japan, in the midst of the Meiji Restoration, was keen to not fall behind when it came to military technology, and devised a replacement for their Type 26 revolver. By 1902, the first Nambu pistol was developed, which was chambered in 8×22mm Nambu. Initially produced for Japanese army and naval officers' private purchase, the 8×22mm Nambu was not officially adopted until 1926 when it was designated as the Type 14 pistol cartridge.

== Usage ==
The 8×22mm Nambu round was first used in the Nambu pistols, which were first used during the Russo-Japanese War. Major usage didn't begin until the Second Sino-Japanese War and Pacific War, during which time, the Type 100 submachine gun was created, which also fired 8×22mm Nambu. By the war's end in 1945, around 400,000 Nambu pistols and 8,500-10000 Type 100s had been produced. Small batches of Nambu pistols were also exported to Siam and China before World War II.

After World War II, there were isolated reports of 8×22mm usage by the Viet Cong during the opening stages of the Vietnam War and the Chinese Communist forces in the Korean War. Afterwards there was no major demand to keep the 8×22mm round afloat, and the post-war Japan Self-Defense Forces swiftly replaced it with the 9×19mm Parabellum, which during World War II was already in use in the United Kingdom and Germany. The JSDF replaced the Nambu pistol and Type 100 with the SIG Sauer P220 and Minebea PM-9, respectively.

In 1939, the cost of 8×22mm Nambu ammunition manufactured by the Imperial Japanese Army's arsenals was 390 yen per 10,000 rounds. Because of the rarity and historical impact of the 8×22mm Nambu, it has become popular among post-war collectors. A box of just 15 rounds was sold in 2009 for $250.

== Performance ==
The standard issue military 8×22mm Nambu round has a 6.6-gram (102 gr) bullet that travels at approximately 310 metres per second (1,030 ft/s) at the muzzle when fired from a Nambu pistol. The muzzle energy of the 8×22mm Nambu is half that of the 9×19mm, and less than half of the 7.62×25mm Tokarev, and it is often regarded as lacking in stopping power. However, its overall stopping power is comparable to that of the 9×17mm (.380 ACP), a widespread caliber which was used by German and Italian officers during World War II in sidearms such as the Beretta M1934 and Walther PPK.

== See also ==
- 8 mm caliber
- List of handgun cartridges
- List of World War II infantry weapons – Japan
