= Kijirō Nambu =

Japanese firearms designer (1869–1949)

- 南部 麒次郎
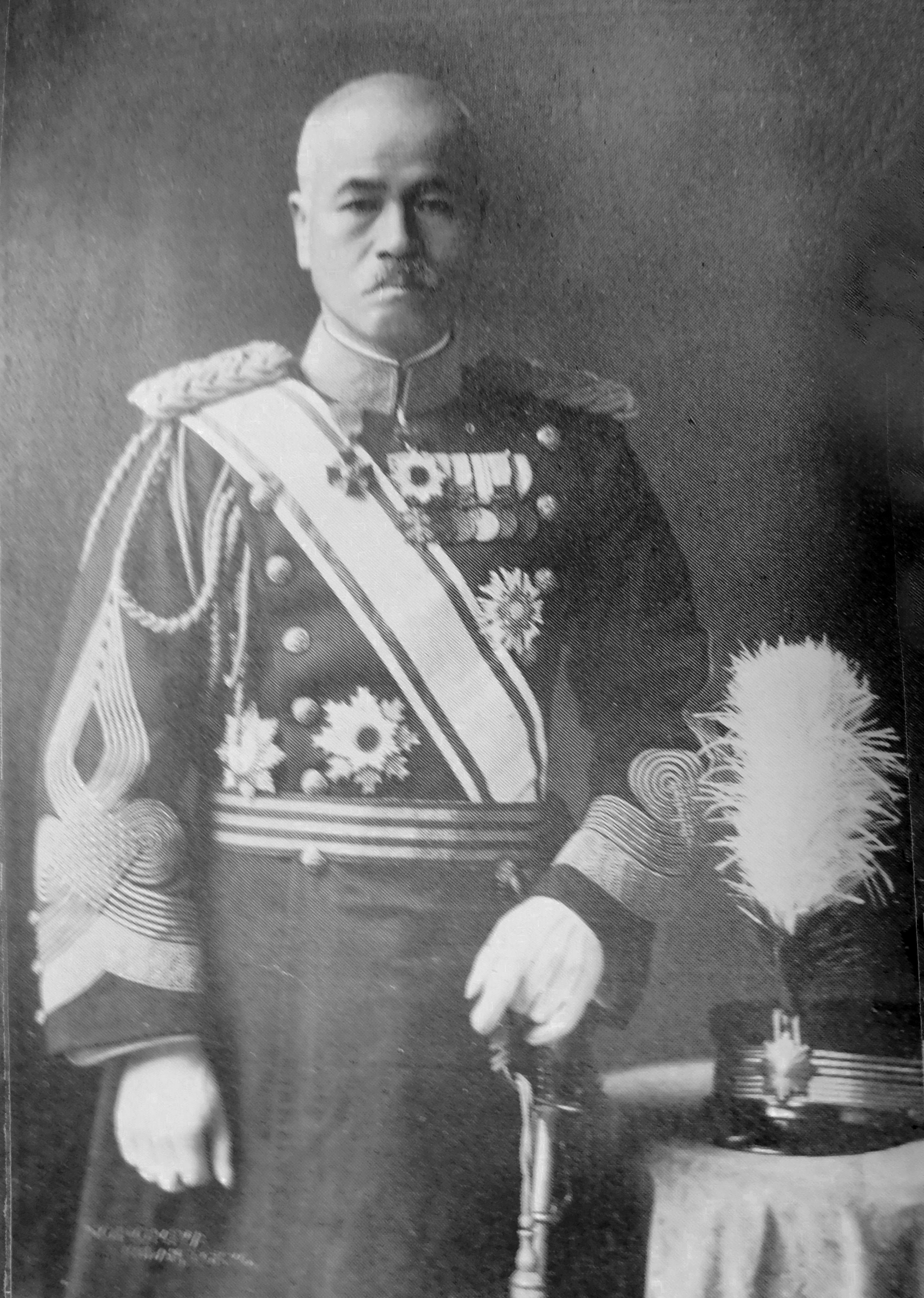
- Born: September 22, 1869; Saga prefecture, Japan
- Died: May 1, 1949 (aged 79)
- Military career
- Allegiance: Empire of Japan
- Branch: Imperial Japanese Army
- Service years: 1889 – 1924
- Rank: Lieutenant General

Kijirō Nambu (南部 麒次郎, Nanbu Kijirō; September 22, 1869 – May 1, 1949) was a Japanese firearms designer and career officer in the Imperial Japanese Army. He founded the Nambu Arms Manufacturing Company, a major manufacturer of Japanese military firearms during the period. He was awarded the Order of the Sacred Treasure (2nd class) in 1914. Because of his prolific firearms designs, Nambu has been described as the "John Browning of Japan."

== Biography ==
Nambu was born as the younger son to a former samurai retainer of the Nabeshima clan, in Saga domain in 1869 (present-day Saga prefecture). His mother died soon after he was born, and as his father had financial difficulties, he was sent out to be raised by a local merchant. Through hard work and determination, he secured a place in the 2nd class of the Imperial Japanese Army Academy at the age of 20. At age 23, he was commissioned a lieutenant of artillery.

In 1897, Nambu was assigned to Tokyo Arsenal, where he was assigned to work under noted weapons designer Nariakira Arisaka on the Type 30 rifle project followed by the Type 26 revolver. He was then promoted to major and ordered to develop a semi automatic pistol for the Japanese military. This design, an 8mm pistol, was the earliest version of the famed Nambu pistol, and was completed in 1902. Nambu built a smaller and lighter 7mm version in 1907. The design was praised by then Army Minister Terauchi Masatake, but the Japanese army did not place it into production due to production costs. The larger version was eventually adopted by the Imperial Japanese Navy's Special Naval Landing Forces, and the smaller version was sold commercially to private customers.

The Type 14 pistol was an improved version of the 1902 version, similar in dimensions and performance. It was issued to non-commissioned officers, while commissioned officers were expected to purchase their own side arms; it became the most common sidearm in use. Most of the pistols were produced by the Tokyo Arsenal with a smaller number manufactured by the Tokio Gasu Denky. Production of Type 14s lasted until the end of World War II in 1945. Total production numbers are estimated at approximately 200,000 for all variants.

During Nambu's tour at the Army Rifle Manufacturing Plant (later renamed the Kokura Arsenal) he developed the Type 3 Heavy Machine Gun in 1914 and the Type 11 light machine gun in 1922. In 1922, Nambu was promoted to lieutenant general and placed in charge of the Tokyo Artillery Arsenal. He reorganized the army arsenal system in 1923 and was named Commander of the Army Explosives Arsenal and Army Institute of Scientific research. In 1924, he retired from active military service,

Nambu founded the Nambu Arms Manufacturing Company in Tokyo in 1927, with financial backing from the Okura zaibatsu . Nambu received many contracts from both the Japanese army and navy for side arms, light machine guns and heavy machine guns, and also for testing and evaluation of many foreign designs. This included the Type 92 Heavy Machine Gun, Type 94 8 mm Pistol, Type II machine pistol, Type 100 submachine gun and licensed production of the Type 99 light machine gun.

At the end of World War II, Nambu announced that his company would cease all weapons production; however, his facilities were sequestered under the American occupation authorities and continued to produce equipment (under the name Shin-Chuō Industries) for the police and subsequently for the post-war Japanese National Safety Forces, the predecessor to the current Japanese Self-Defense Force. Nambu died in May 1949, and his company was absorbed into the Japanese precision equipment manufacturer Minebea Co.

== Weapons ==
- Types A, B, and 14 Nambu pistol
- Type 94 Nambu pistol
- Experimental model 1 submachine gun
- Experimental model 2 submachine gun
- Nambu-type training light machine gun
- Type 100 submachine gun
- Type 3 heavy machine gun
- Type 92 heavy machine gun
- Type 11 light machine gun
- Type 96 light machine gun
- Type 97 light machine gun
- Type 99 light machine gun
- Type 38 Arisaka rifle
- Type 44 Arisaka carbine
- Type 99 Arisaka rifle
