= Type 96 light machine gun =

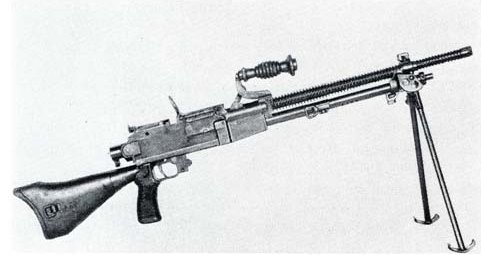
- Type 96 light machine gun (without magazine)
- Type: Light machine gun
- Place of origin: Empire of Japan

Service history
- In service: 1936–1945
- Used by: See Users
- Wars: Second Sino-Japanese War; Soviet–Japanese border conflicts World War II; Indonesian National Revolution; Chinese Civil War; Korean War; First Indochina War; Vietnam War

Production history
- Designer: Kijiro Nambu
- Designed: 1936
- Unit cost: 1,125 yen ($263 USD) in December 1941
- Produced: 1936–1943
- No. built: 41,000

Specifications
- Mass: 9 kg (20 lb)
- Length: 1,070 mm (42 in)
- Barrel length: 550 mm (22 in)
- Cartridge: 6.5×50mm Arisaka
- Action: Gas-operated
- Rate of fire: 550 rounds/min
- Muzzle velocity: 735 m/s (2,410 ft/s)
- Effective firing range: 800 m (870 yd)
- Maximum firing range: 3,500 m (3,800 yd) (6.5×50mm Arisaka)
- Feed system: 30 round detachable box magazine

The Type 96 light machine gun (九六式軽機関銃, Kyūroku-shiki Kei-kikanjū) was a light machine gun used by the Imperial Japanese Army in the interwar period and in World War II. It was first introduced in 1936, and fires the 6.5×50mm Arisaka from 30-round top-mounted magazines. A combination of unimpressive ballistic performance and a lack of reliability caused the Imperial Japanese Army to try to replace the Type 96 with the Type 99 light machine gun, though both saw major usage until the end of the war.

== History and development ==
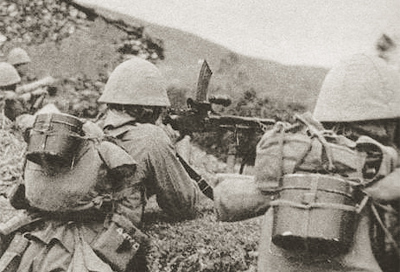
IJA soldiers firing their Type 96 at positions

Combat experience in the Manchurian Incident of 1931 and subsequent actions in Manchuria and northern China reaffirmed to the Japanese army the utility of machine guns in providing covering fire for advancing infantry. The earlier Type 11 light machine gun was a lightweight machine gun, which could be easily transportable by an infantry squad into combat. However, the open hopper design of the Type 11 allowed dust and grit to enter into the gun, which was liable to jam in muddy or dirty conditions due to issues with poor dimensional tolerances. This gave the weapon a bad reputation with Japanese troops, and led to calls for its redesign. The Army's Kokura Arsenal tested the Czechoslovak ZB vz. 26 machine gun, samples of which had been captured from the National Revolutionary Army of the Republic of China, and (after borrowing certain elements) issued a new design, designated the Type 96 light machine gun, in 1936. The gun was produced at Kokura, Nagoya Arsenal and Mukden between 1936 and 1943, with a total production run of about 41,000.

According to Rottman, the Type 96 was a slightly modified copy of the ZB vz.26 despite claims to the contrary, while US military manuals note that the gun combined the features of both the Hotchkiss machine gun and the ZB vs. 26. Ness notes that the Type 96 featured a unique bolt lock system designed by Kijiro Nambu.

== Design ==
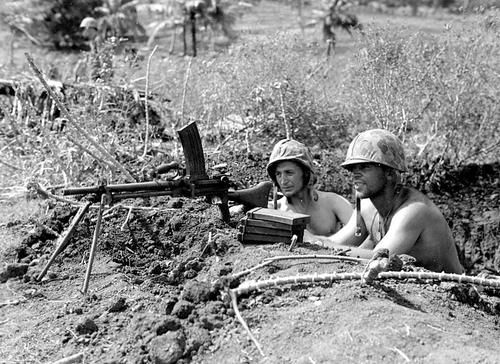
Marines with a captured Type 96

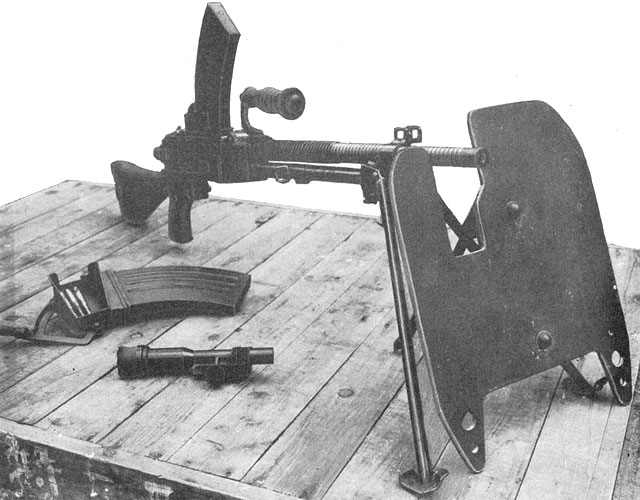
Type 96 light machine gun with Type 99 (1939) armor shield, size 12 in.x16 in.

The Type 96 light machine gun was almost a complete reworking of the Type 11, combining the features of the Hotchkiss with some of the ZB vz. 26. As with the Type 11, it continued to use the same 6.5×50mm Arisaka cartridges as the Type 38 rifle infantry rifle, although the adoption of the more powerful 7.7×58mm Arisaka rimless round for the Type 99 rifle soon created a demand for a new light machine gun capable of firing the same ammunition, the Type 99 light machine gun. Due to their visual resemblance to the British Bren light machine gun they are often mistakenly regarded as clones.

The major differences from the Type 11 were the top-mounted curved detachable box replacing the problematic ammunition hopper with an overhead magazine and the removal of the receiver-mounted oiler (though cartridges needed to be lubricated before they were loaded into the magazines), the latter made possible the incorporation of a quick-change barrel to avoid overheating; the Type 96 also features a unique Nambu-designed bolt lock, in the form of a square frame that moves up and down to lock and unlock the barrel. The Type 96 had a blade front sight and a leaf rear sight, with graduations from 200 to 1,500 meters, with windage adjustment. A 2.5X telescopic sight with a 10 degree field of view could be attached at the right side of the gun.

The Type 96 also had a folding bipod attached to the gas block, and could be fitted with the standard infantry Type 30 bayonet, which could be attached to the gas block below the barrel, making it, alongside the later Type 99 the only machine gun used in the Second World War that a bayonet could be attached to, despite the fact that the weapon weight of 9 kg (20 lb) made it awkward to handle in hand-to-hand combat. The gun had no select-fire capability.

The Type 96 was somewhat more reliable than the Type 11, but it still required the use of lubricated ammunition to avoid jams. In practice, this tended to worsen the problem instead, as the oiled cartridges tended to become coated with dust and sand. This feature and its inherent faults were dropped with the introduction of the Type 99 light machine gun. Like the Type 11, the gun doesn't handle standard 6.5×50mm Arisaka rounds without malfunctions, requiring the use of special ammunition (marked with a circled "G" on the cartons) to ensure proper extraction of spent cases.

Parts were usually non-interchangeable, each gun being hand-fitted and manufacturers introducing minor changes to their designs, such as flash suppressor, cooling fins, and ejection port covers, without any regard for standardization; an issue that also plagued its successor, the Type 99.

== Combat record ==
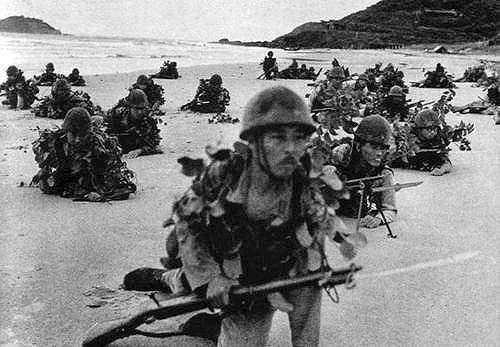
Imperial Japanese Army soldiers armed with the Type 96 storm the beaches of Malaya

The Type 96 came into active service in 1936 and was intended to replace the older Type 11; however the Type 11 had already been produced in large quantities, and both weapons remained in service until the end of the war. The Type 96 handled well and could be easily fired from the hip, but it was sensitive to dirt, dust, and sand, requiring it to be always kept clean and oiled. While the gun's light weight and mobility proved to be useful in jungle warfare, the 6.5 mm caliber wasn't entirely suitable for combat situations. It was supplanted by the more reliable Type 99 light machine gun, which fired a larger 7.7 mm round and had greater stopping power.

According to US military manuals, reports of Japanese soldiers making use of Thompson submachine guns may have originated from the fact that the Type 96 could be hip fired.

After World War II, it was used by Indonesian forces during the Indonesian National Revolution against Dutch forces notably during the attack on Jogjakarta 1949. It was used by the Viet Minh and the North Vietnamese forces during the First and Second Indochina Wars.

== Users ==
- Republic of China
- People's Republic of China
- Indonesia
- Empire of Japan
- North Korea
- Thailand
- Vietnam
