= 6.5×50mmSR Arisaka =

Japanese military rifle cartridge

6.5×50 Arisaka
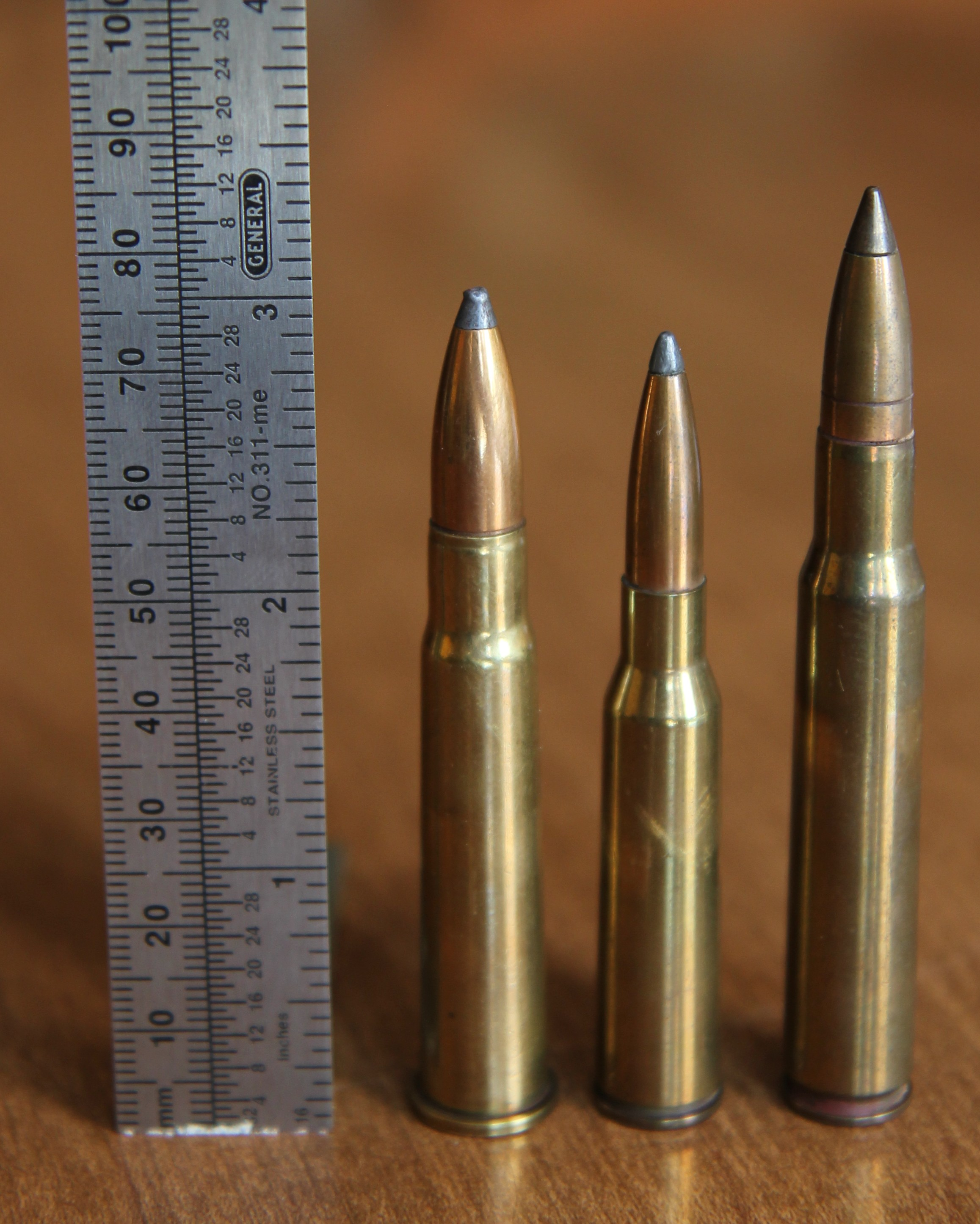
- 6.5×50mmSR Arisaka (center) with .303 British (left) and .30-06 (right)
- Type: Rifle cartridge
- Place of origin: Empire of Japan

Service history
- Used by: Empire of Japan, Russian Empire, United Kingdom, China, North Korea, South Korea, Thailand, Finland, Indonesia, Cambodia, Poland
- Wars: Russo-Japanese War, World War I, Second Sino-Japanese War, World War II, Indonesian War of Independence, Korean War, Malayan Emergency

Production history
- Produced: 1897–today

Specifications
- Case type: Semi-rimmed, bottleneck
- Bullet diameter: 6.63 mm (0.261 in)
- Land diameter: 6.33 mm (0.249 in)
- Neck diameter: 7.37 mm (0.290 in)
- Shoulder diameter: 10.40 mm (0.409 in)
- Base diameter: 11.45 mm (0.451 in)
- Rim diameter: 12.08 mm (0.476 in)
- Rim thickness: 1.143 mm (0.0450 in)
- Case length: 51.00 mm (2.008 in)
- Overall length: 76.00 mm (2.992 in)
- Case capacity: 3 cm^{3} (46 gr H_{2}O)
- Rifling twist: 1/9 inches
- Primer type: Large rifle
- Maximum pressure (C.I.P.): 295.0 MPa (42,790 psi)

Ballistic performance
Bullet mass/type	Velocity	Energy
138.9 gr (9 g) FMJ	770 m/s (2,500 ft/s)	2,666 J (1,966 ft⋅lbf)
- Test barrel length: 800 mm

The 6.5×50mmSR Arisaka (designated as the 6,5 × 51 R (Arisaka) by the C.I.P.) is a semi-rimmed rifle cartridge with a 6.705 mm (.264 in) diameter bullet. It was the standard Japanese military cartridge from 1897 until the late 1930s for service rifles and machine guns when it was gradually replaced by the 7.7×58mm Arisaka.

== History ==
The 6.5×50mmSR was first introduced as the Type 30 cartridge with a round-nosed bullet, by the Imperial Japanese Army in 1897, for the newly adopted Type 30 Arisaka infantry rifle and carbine. The new rifle and cartridge replaced the 8×52mm Murata round used in the Type 22 Murata rifle. In 1902, the Imperial Japanese Navy also adopted the 6.5×50mmSR for their Type 35 rifles. In 1907, a spitzer round was adopted as the Type 38 cartridge for all subsequent Japanese service small arms in 6.5 mm caliber.

The 6.5 mm Japanese round was later criticized as being under-powered in comparison to other contemporary military cartridges such as the .30-06, .303 British, 7.92×57mm Mauser, and 7.62×54mmR. For this reason, it was gradually replaced by the more powerful 7.7×58 mm cartridge in 1938. Both cartridges were used until the end of the war, which created difficulty in supplying Japanese forces with the appropriate ammunition. Because of the long barrel of the Type 38 rifle, one benefit of the 6.5 mm round was that it produced very little muzzle flash and smoke. Furthermore, the 6.5 mm round with the Type 38 spitzer bullet had a desirable flat trajectory, and effective terminal ballistics with rapid yaw on impact causing severe wounds. Larger caliber military cartridges are also optimal for machine guns to use for long-range firing, and rifles were often only made to chamber them in the interest of logistics. Japan had the 7.7 mm cartridge in use only by machine guns for years before developing a rifle for the round.

=== Type 95 6.5×30mm ===
The Type 95 6.5×30 mm was a shortened version which was proposed for the Experimental 1934 Model 2A submachine gun.

== Military ammunition ==
The early 6.5×50 mm Type 30 cartridges had a cupronickel, round-nosed bullet weighing 10.4 grams (160 gr) fired with approximately 2.0 grams (31 gr) of smokeless powder. This was later changed with the adoption of the Type 38 cartridge when Japan, in line with the other great powers around the same time, changed to the pointed, or spitzer, bullet in the first decade of the twentieth century. The Type 38 spitzer round fired a 9.0-gram (139 gr) bullet with a powder charge of 33 grains (2.1 g) for a muzzle velocity of around 770 metres per second (2,500 ft/s).

The Type 38 spitzer version of the 6.5×50 mm cartridge remained unchanged until after the adoption of the Type 11 light machine gun in 1922. The relatively short barrel (17.5 inches) produced excessive flash with standard ammunition (initially intended for Type 38 rifles with barrels more than a foot longer). By combining nitrocellulose with nitroglycerine, a new propellant for the cartridge was introduced to reduce the muzzle flash and visible powder signature. The powder burned much more completely in a shorter barrel and produced much less flash as a result. The new round was marked by a circled "G" on the ammunition cartons for the Type 11 light machine gun.

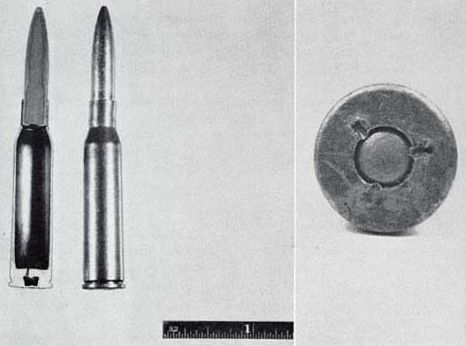
Japanese military 6.5×50mmSR Arisaka round (Type 38).

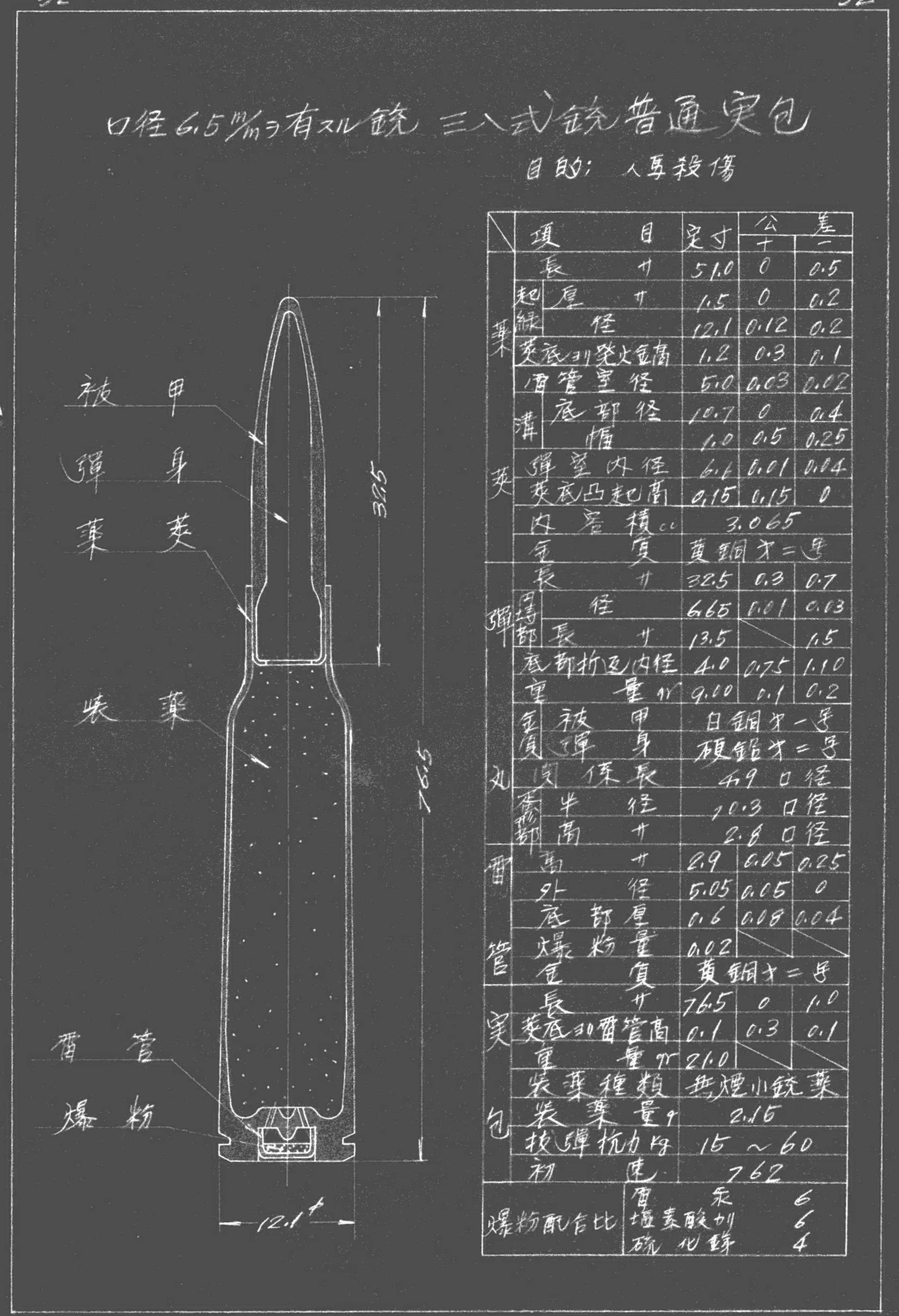
Original Japanese military Type 38 cartridge specification sheet.

This special ammunition was also issued to soldiers carrying the Type 96 light machine gun introduced in 1936, and to snipers issued the Type 97 sniper rifle, introduced in 1937. The advantage of the new ammunition to the sniper was that it aided in his concealment as the ammunition produced less muzzle flash than standard rounds and thus did not give away the sniper's position.

The 6.5 mm gallery ammunition was also produced for the Japanese military which incorporated a paper or wood bullet. These were either all brass rounds or, more commonly, red-varnished wood with a metal base and rim. Ammunition used in the spigot-type Japanese grenade launchers often has paper bullets and can be identified by the staked primers. An armour-piercing bullet was later developed and introduced in 1932 which was designated as the Type 92 armour-piercing ball.

== Other military use ==
=== Chinese usage ===
During the Second Sino-Japanese War, Chinese forces managed to capture large quantities of Type 38 rifles and Type 11 light machine guns. China's chronic lack of weaponry forced them to use these captured weapons en masse during the war. After the war, both nationalist and communist forces continued to use them in the civil war that followed. Some Chinese units were still using these weapons during the Korean War.

=== Russian usage ===
After observing the effectiveness of the Type 30 6.5×50mm round used against them during the Russo-Japanese War of 1904–1905, leading Russian arms designers chambered early Russian semi-automatic rifle designs for the Japanese round. Since the standard Russian military rifle cartridge of the time, the 7.62×54mmR rimmed round, was too powerful and generated excessive recoil in an automatic weapon, a 6.5 mm round was seen as more appropriate. Early designs by Vladimir Fedorov utilized 6.5×50 mm, including the Fedorov Avtomat rifle which was issued to troops, though in small numbers. Later, Russian troops on the Armenian front were issued with Type 38 carbines by the tsar's government. Russians also tended to modify the Type 38's magazine latch, as it was found that gloved hands would sometimes inadvertently nudge the magazine release and dump the ammunition.

=== British usage ===
In 1914, approximately 150,000 Arisaka Type 30 and Type 38 rifles and carbines were sold to British forces and were given the designations Pattern 1900 (for the Type 30) and Pattern 1907 (for the Type 38) for training purposes. In the latter part of 1915, Type 30s had been issued to four regiments and Type 38s had been issued to eight regiments. Approximately 50,000 Arisakas were issued to the Royal Navy to replace the Lee-Enfields requisitioned by the Army in late 1914. The 6.5×50mm round was subsequently produced in Britain by the Kynoch company and was officially adopted for British service as the .256-inch (6.5 mm) caliber Mk II in 1917. The Arab armies, organized by British captain T. E. Lawrence, to fight against the Ottoman Empire during World War I, were armed with a portion of the 500,000 rifles purchased from Japan from 1914 to 1916, and many were the non-functional Type 30 rifles which had seen heavy service during the Russo-Japanese War in 1904–1905. In all, the 6.5×50 mm Japanese semi-rimmed round has been used in either Japanese or domestically designed weapons by Japan, Russia, the United Kingdom, China, North Korea, South Korea, Thailand, Finland and Indonesia. Many of the British naval Arisakas were given to the White Russians.

The 6.5 mm Arisaka rifles were used mainly by the British for training, homeland defense, and by naval units. In 1916, the rifles were shipped to Russia and none were left by the end of World War I.

=== Finnish usage ===
The Russians, having acquired 600,000 Type 30 and Type 38 rifles by direct purchase from Japan during World War I or by capture during the Russo-Japanese War, warehoused some of these rifles in Finland. During the Russian Revolution, many Finns seized the chance for independence and took Arisakas from Russian arsenals. They were used mainly by Finnish cavalry and, after Finland's independence, experiments were taken to upgrade the Type 38s to 7.92×57mm Mauser. With parts and ammunition drying up, Finland relegated the Arisaka to the reserves and the merchant marines before trading a large number of them off to Estonia. Finnish-issued Arisakas have district numbers and an S branded on the stock.

== Today ==
As Arisaka rifles have increased in popularity with collectors, modern manufacture has resumed. The cartridge is available for retail in Europe and North America, and is manufactured by Norma of Sweden, and Precision Cartridge Inc. Brass cases are also manufactured and sold by Prvi Partizan (PPU) for purposes of hand loading (PPU brass headstamped as 6.5x51R). Reloadable boxer-primed cases are sometimes produced by reforming .220 Swift brass. Bullets are .264 caliber. It is also known as 6.5 Jap in the United States.

== Other 6.5 mm firearms ==
Other 6.5×50mm long-arms used by Japan included a few Type 13 Mukden Arsenal Mauser rifles produced at the Hoten Arsenal in Manchuria (Manchukuo). These rifles were built on Danish Nielsen & Winther machinery originally for the Manchurian warlord Zhang Zuolin beginning in 1924. When Japan took over the arsenal after the Manchurian Incident of 1931, the Type 13 rifle continued to be produced in 7.92×57mm Mauser caliber, however, an unknown number were also produced in 6.5×50mm. The Type I rifles built by Italy for Japan under the terms of the Anti-Comintern pact from 1939 to 1943 are in standard 6.5×50mm Jap. Though Italian in origin, they do not safely fire the longer, but outwardly similar, 6.5×52mm Carcano round. An unknown number of Dutch M1895 Mannlicher rifles and carbines captured by Japanese forces during the seizure of the Dutch East Indies in 1942 were converted to 6.5×50mm from the 6.5×53mm Dutch rimmed chambering.

== See also ==
- 6 mm caliber
- List of rifle cartridges
- Table of handgun and rifle cartridges
