= Type 11 light machine gun =

Type of Japanese light machine gun

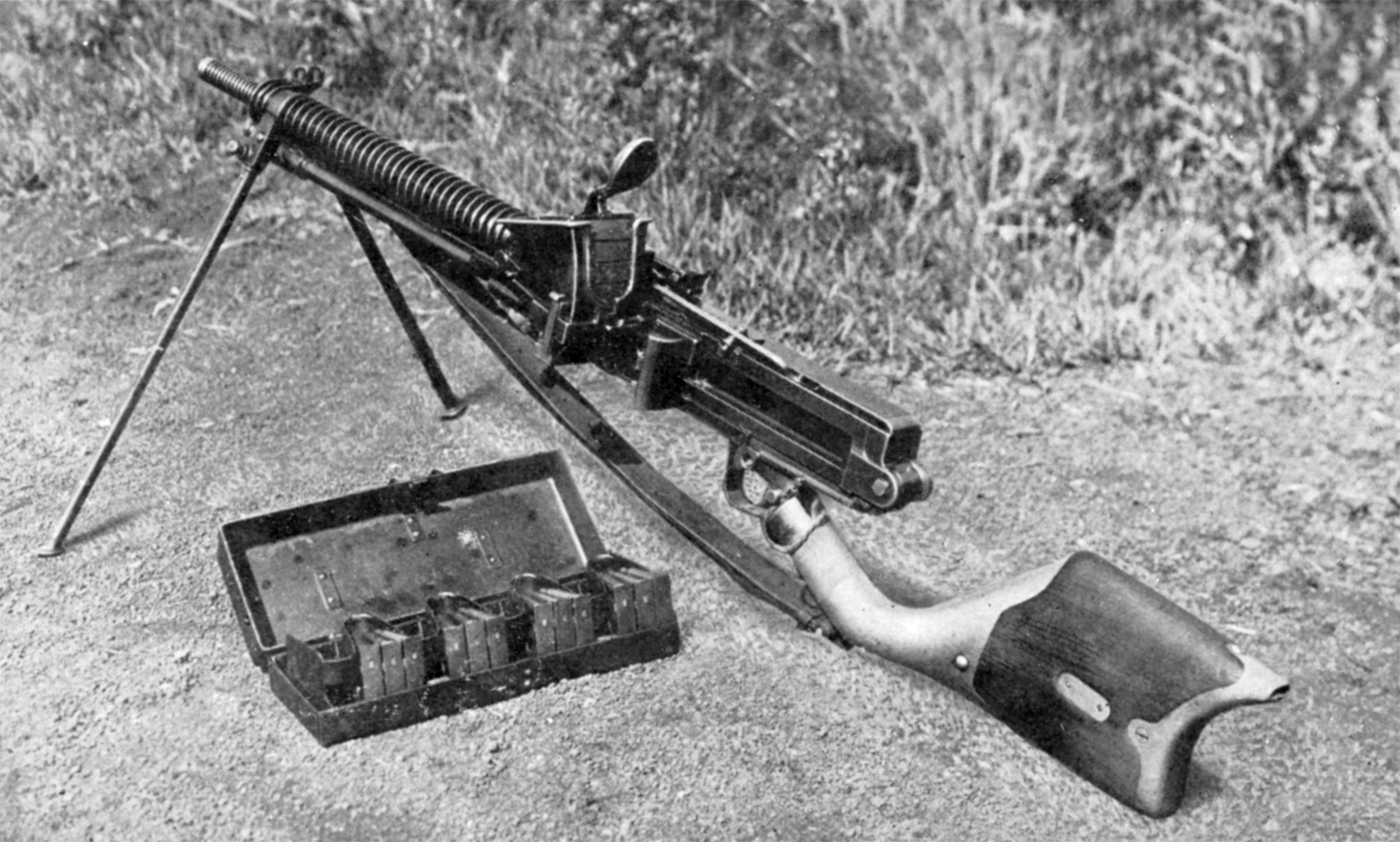
- Type 11 light machine gun
- Type: Light machine gun
- Place of origin: Empire of Japan

Service history
- In service: 1922–1945
- Used by: See Users
- Wars: Second Sino-Japanese War; Soviet-Japanese Border Wars; World War II; Chinese Civil War; Indonesian National Revolution; First Indochina War; Darul Islam Rebellion; Hukbalahap Rebellion; Malayan Emergency; Korean War; Vietnam War

Production history
- Designer: Kijiro Nambu
- Designed: 1922
- Unit cost: 585 yen ($157 USD) in August 1939
- Produced: 1922–1941
- No. built: 29,000

Specifications
- Mass: 10.2 kg (22.49 lb)
- Length: 1,100 mm (43.3 in)
- Barrel length: 443 mm (17.4 in)
- Cartridge: 6.5×50mm Arisaka
- Action: Gas-operated
- Rate of fire: 500 rounds/min
- Muzzle velocity: 736 m/s (2,415 ft/s)
- Effective firing range: 800 m (870 yd)
- Maximum firing range: 3,700 m (4,000 yd) (6.5×50mm Arisaka)
- Feed system: 30-round, hopper system using 6x 5-round stripper clips
- Sights: Iron

The Type 11 light machine gun (十一年式軽機関銃, Jyūichinen-shiki Kei-kikanjū) is a light machine gun used by the Imperial Japanese Army in the interwar period and during World War II. Adopted as the Imperial Japanese Army's first light machine gun, the Type 11 was designed by Kijirō Nambu and had certain similarities to the Hotchkiss series of machine guns. It had an unusual feed system which required five round clips to be dropped into a hopper, this held up to a total of six clips (30 rounds) and each round was oiled as it was fed into the chamber. Despite good overall performance, this feed system was prone to collect dirt and grit which would jam the weapon while in use. It was issued to troops in 1922 and saw extensive service as a squad weapon until 1945.

== History ==
Combat experience in the Russo-Japanese War of 1904–1905 had convinced the Japanese of the utility of machine guns in providing covering fire for advancing infantry. This was reinforced by first-hand observations of European combat tactics by Japanese military attachés during the First World War, and the Army Technical Bureau was tasked with the development of a lightweight machine gun which could be easily transported by an infantry squad. The resultant "Type 11 light machine gun" (named after the 11th year of the reign of Emperor Taishō, or 1922) was the first light machine gun to be mass-produced in Japan and the oldest Japanese light machine gun design to see service in the Pacific War. It was superseded by the Type 96 light machine gun in 1936.

== Design details ==
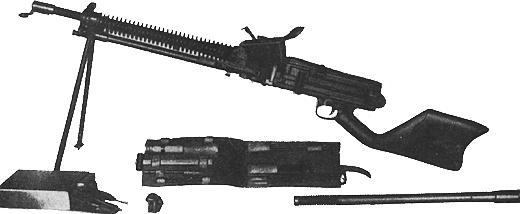
A Type 11 with accessories

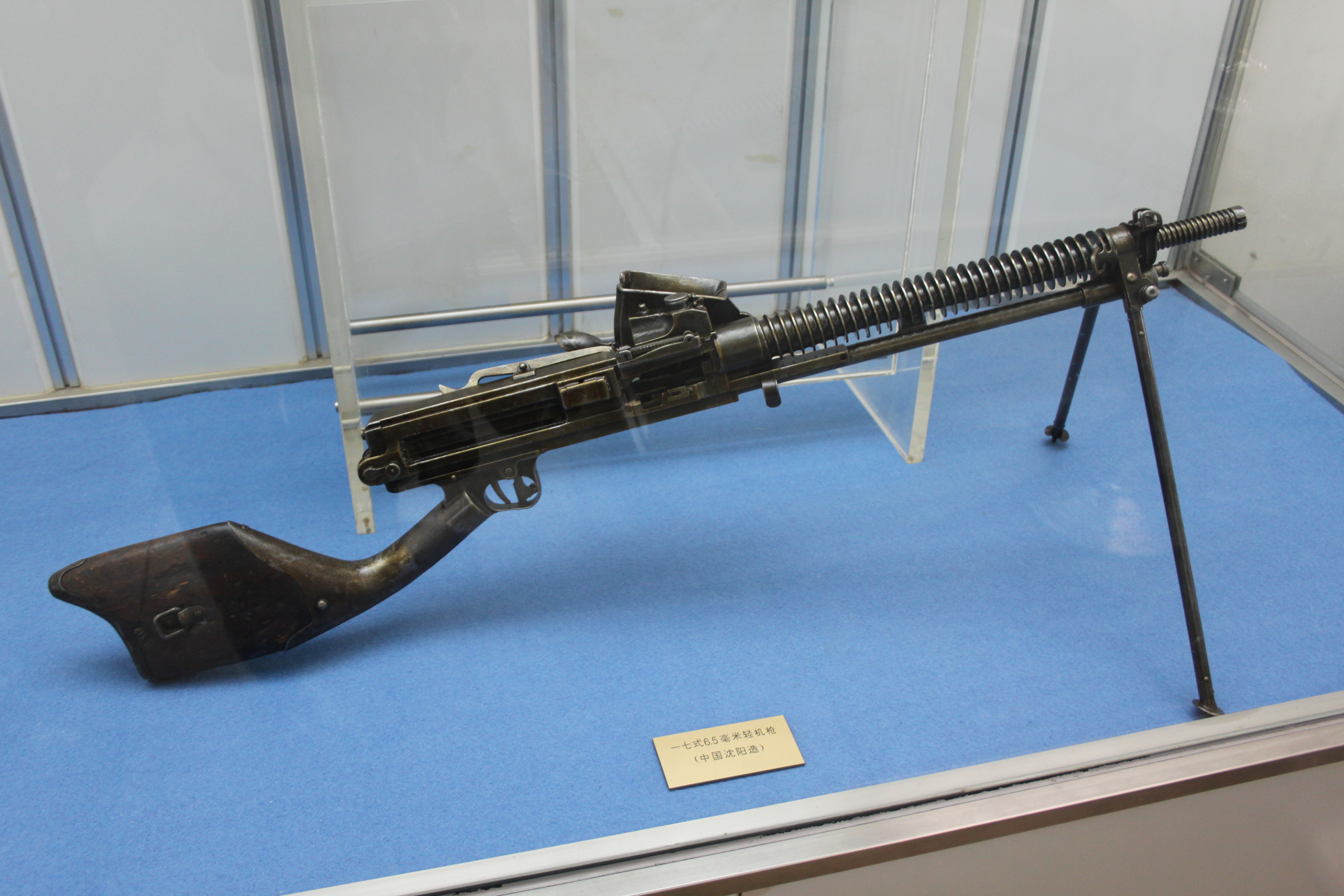
A Chinese copy of the Type 11 light machine gun (Type 17) in the Military Museum of the Chinese People's Revolution, Beijing

The Type 11 light machine gun was a design by famed arms designer Kijirō Nambu, based on a modification of the French Hotchkiss M1909 Benét–Mercié machine gun. It was an air-cooled, gas-operated design, using the same 6.5×50mm Arisaka cartridges as the Type 38 infantry rifle.

A feature of the Type 11 machine gun is its detachable hopper; it can be refilled while attached and does not require removal during operation. Instead of a belt or box magazine, the Type 11 was designed to hold up to six of the same cartridge clips used on the Type 38 rifle. The five-round clips were stacked lying flat above the receiver, secured by a spring arm, and the rounds were stripped from the lowest clip one at a time, with the empty clip dropped out the bottom and the next clip automatically falling into place as the gun was fired. The system had the advantage that any squad member could supply ammunition and that the hopper could be replenished at any time. The relatively short barrel (17.5 inches) produced excessive flash with standard ammunition (initially intended for Type 38 rifles with barrels more than a foot longer). A new load was introduced which burned much more completely in the Type 11's short barrel and produced much less flash as a result. This new round was called the 6.5×50mm Arisaka genso round and the ammunition cartons were identified by a circled "G".

The inherent disadvantage of the hopper was that the open feeder box allowed dust and grit to enter the gun, which was liable to jam in muddy or dirty conditions due to issues with poor dimensional tolerances, which gave the weapon a bad reputation with Japanese troops. Another issue was that the weight of the rifle cartridges in the side-mounted hopper unbalanced the weapon when fully loaded. To compensate, the buttstock was designed in a way that it bent to the right, leading to the Chinese nickname for the weapon as the "bent buttstock" (Chinese: 歪把子). Reloading the weapon during an assault charge proved impossible due to the clip feeding system.

== Variants ==
Type 89 "flexible" – Two Type 11 actions mounted on a flexible mounting for anti-aircraft use and as a rear-defense aerial gun. The machine gun was chambered for the 7.7x58mmSR Type 89 cartridge. It was equipped with a metallic Y-shaped stock and two spade grips, the barrels had no cooling fins. It was fed from two 45-round quadrant-shaped pan magazines (each magazine had a place for nine five-round stripper clips). The double-barrelled machine gun weighted about 28 kg and had a rate of fire of around 1,400 rpm.

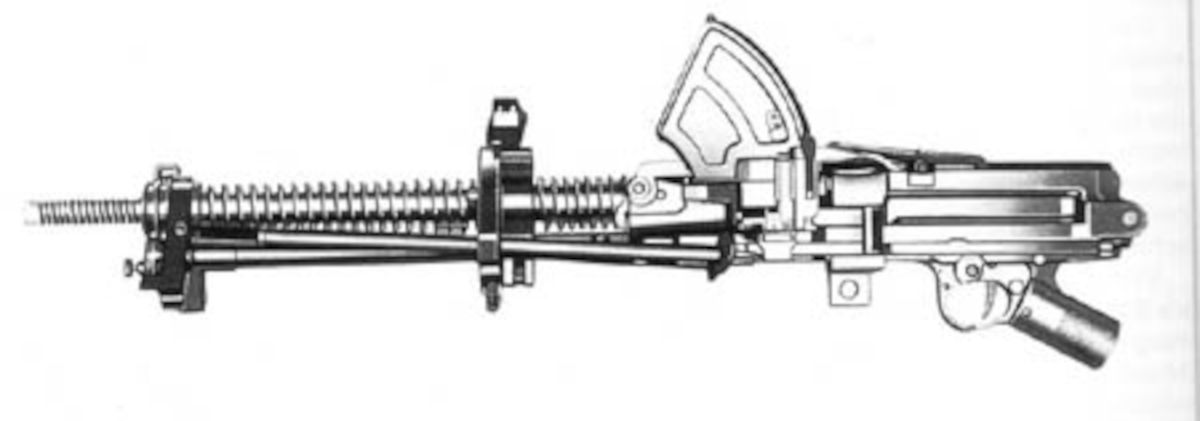
Type 91 tank machine gun

Type 91 – was a modified Type 11 for use on tanks and armoured vehicles. The machine gun was equipped with an angled pistol grip, the stock and bipod were removed, and the hopper was extended to hold three extra clips for a total of 45 rounds. Additionally, the machine gun was equipped with two brackets (on the right side) for mounting a 1.5x30 scope manufactured by Tomioka Kogaku.

Te-4 – A modified Type 11 which was designed to replace the Type 89 "flexible" due to the excessive weight of the latter. It used a different flexible mounting, had a shorter wooden stock and a straight pistol grip with an enlarged trigger guard, the barrel had no cooling fins. It was chambered for the 7.7x58mmSR Type 89 cartridge and fed from 70-round pan magazines. It is uncertain whether the Te-4 was made by splitting the Type 89 "flexible" or was a direct derivative of Type 11.

Liao Type 17 - A Chinese copy of the Type 11 design manufactured in small numbers at the Mukden Arsenal. Around 400 were produced between 1928 and 1931, production was halted due to the Japanese invasion of Manchuria. One surviving example is displayed at the Military Museum of the Chinese People's Revolution in Beijing.

== Combat record ==
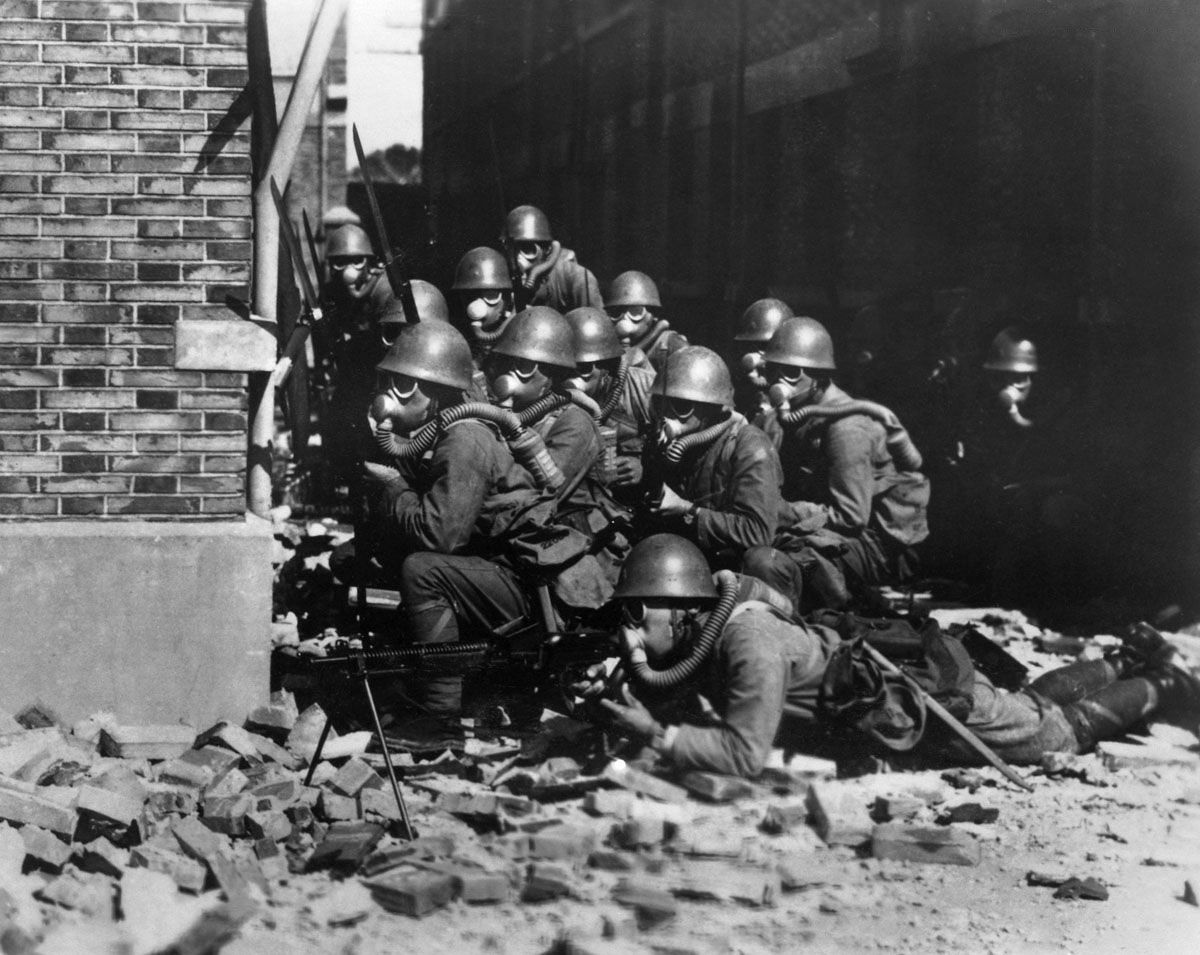
IJN Special Naval Landing Forces armed with the Type 11 during the Battle of Shanghai

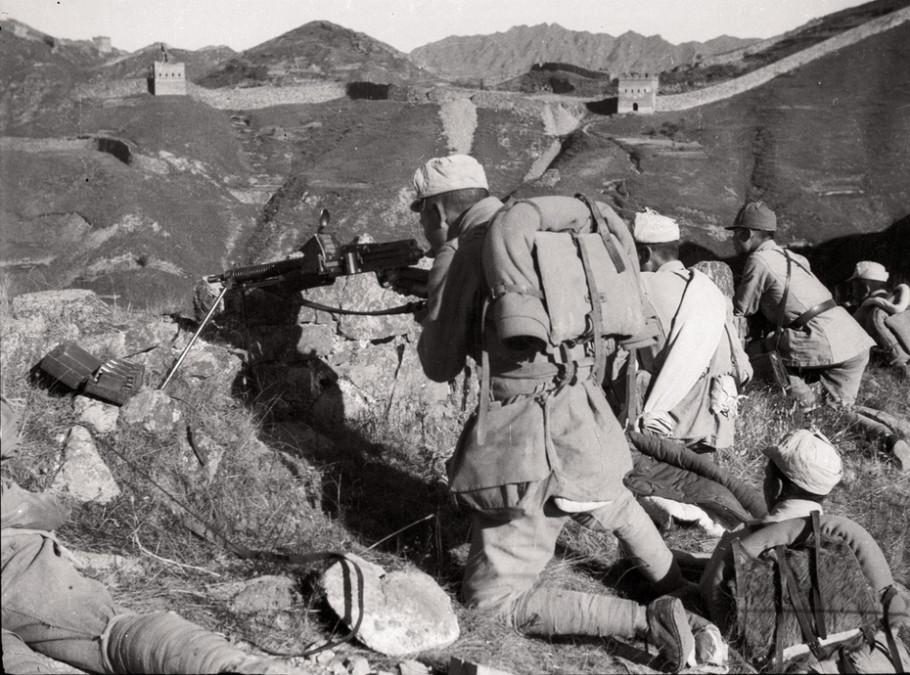
A Type 11 light machine gun captured by the Chinese Army and used against IJA soldiers

The Type 91 Tank Machine Gun is being used by the IJA soldier during Battle of Shanghai (1937)

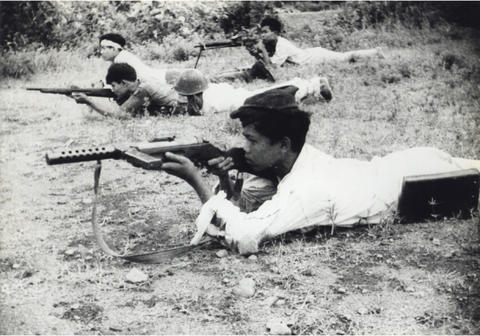
A Type 11 (background) used by Indonesian irregulars during training, 1946

The Type 11 came into active service in 1922, and some 29,000 were produced by the time production stopped in 1941. It was the primary Japanese light machine gun through the Manchurian Incident and in the early stages of the Second Sino-Japanese War. Although superseded by the Type 96 light machine gun in production in 1936, it remained in service with front-line combat through the end of World War II. Many were captured by the Chinese and were used against the Japanese. The Manchukuo Imperial Army replaced its ex-Chinese ZB vz. 30s with Type 11s in 1936. Both sides also used Type 11 machine guns during the Chinese Civil War and North Korea used Type 11 and Type 91 during the Korean War. Indonesian nationalist forces used the Type 11 during the Indonesian National Revolution. The Viet Minh also used the Type 11 during the First Indochina War, as did the Viet Cong during the Vietnam War.

== Users ==
- Republic of China: Purchased a small number before war with Japan began. Later captured Japanese examples were used by all Chinese armies including Nationalist, Warlord, Collaborationist and Communist.
- Indonesia
- Japanese Empire
- Malayan National Liberation Army
- Manchukuo
- North Korea
- People's Liberation Army
- Philippines: Captured from Japanese army
- South Korea
- Viet Cong
- Viet Minh
