= Gras =

Gras may refer to:

== People ==
- Basile Gras (1836–1901), French firearm designer
- Enrico Gras (1919–1981), Italian filmmaker
- Felix Gras (1844–1901), Provençal poet and novelist
- Laurent Gras (disambiguation)
- N. S. B. Gras (1884–1956), Canadian-American economist
- Patricia Gras (born 1960), American journalist
- Paweł Graś (born 1964), Polish politician

== Places ==
- Gras, Ardèche, a commune in France
- Les Gras, a commune in the Doubs department, France

== Other uses ==
- The Gras rifle: the Fusil Gras mle 1874, was a French service rifle that came into service in 1874, and some countries still used as late as 1940.
- Generally recognized as safe, a designation of the American Food and Drug Administration
- Graisse, a French wine grape variety
- Gras conjecture, in algebraic number theory

== See also ==
- GRA (disambiguation)
- Grass (disambiguation)
