= Grass (disambiguation) =

Grass typically refers to various species of low-lying plants, especially those in the family Poaceae.

Grass may also refer to:

- Grass (surname)

== Places ==
- Grass Mountain (Vermont)
- Grass Range, Montana
- Grass Township, Spencer County, Indiana
- Grass Valley, California

== Art, entertainment, and media ==
=== Film ===
- Grass (1925 film), a documentary about the Bakhtiari tribe of Iran
- Grass (1999 film), a documentary about marijuana
- Grass (1968), an independent film by Clarke Mackey
- Grass (2018 film), a South Korean film

=== Games ===
- Grass (card game), a cannabis-themed card game similar to Mille Bornes

=== Literature ===
- Grass (Tepper novel), a novel in The Arbai Trilogy by Sheri Tepper
- "Grass", a poem by Patti Smith from her 1978 book Babel
- "Grass", a poem by Carl Sandburg
- Grass (graphic novel), by Keum Suk Gendry-Kim

=== Music ===
- "Grass", Russian art song by Aleksandr Yegorovich Varlamov (1801–1848)
- Grass (album), a 2005 album by Keller Williams
- "Grass" (Animal Collective song), a single by the band Animal Collective
- "Grass" (XTC song), a 1986 single by XTC, written Moulding, from the Skylarking album
- "Grass" (Robert Wyatt song) single, words by poet Ivor Cutler 1981
- "Grass", a 2026 song by Dry Cleaning for Secret Love

=== Television ===
- Grass (TV series), a 2003 BBC television series

== Computing and technology ==
- GRASS (programming language), a programming language used for animations
- GRASS GIS, a geographic information system
- Gradient Recall Acquisition using Steady States, a form of magnetic resonance imaging

== Slang usage ==
- Grass, grasser or Supergrass (informant) in the UK, an informant, especially one criminal informing on another, to the police or other authorities.
- Grass, an informal name for marijuana.

== Other uses of the above ==
- Grass dance, a Native American style of pow wow dancing

== See also ==
- Gras (disambiguation)
- Grasse, a commune in the Alpes-Maritimes department (of which it is a sub-prefecture), on the French Riviera
