= Murata Tsuneyoshi =

19th-century Japanese swordsman, marksman, soldier, and inventor

Danshaku Murata Tsuneyoshi
- 村田 経芳
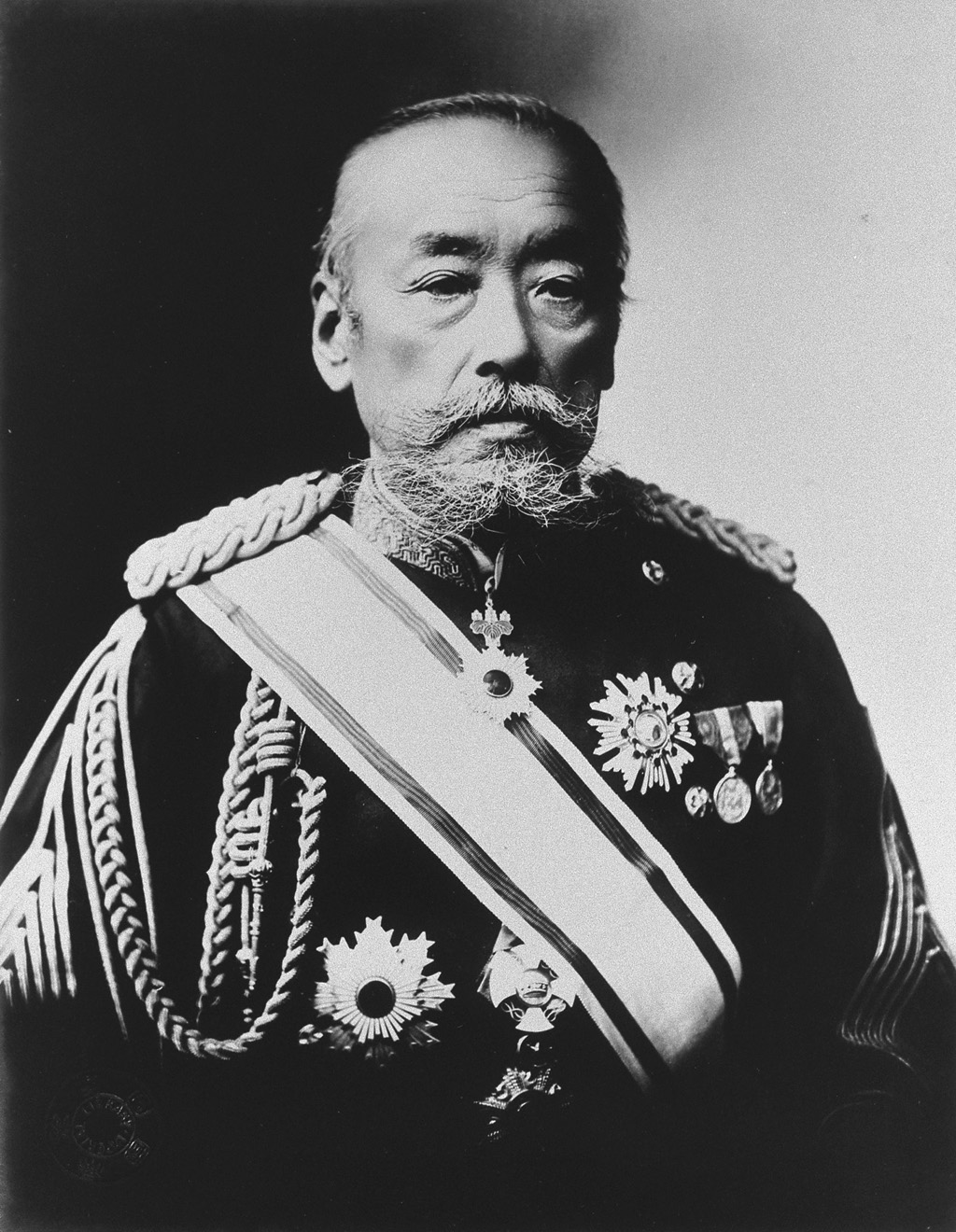

Personal details
- Born: July 30, 1838 Satsuma Domain, Satsuma Province, Japan
- Died: February 9, 1921 (aged 82) Tokyo, Tokyo Prefecture, Japan

Military service
- Allegiance: Satsuma Domain; Imperial Japanese Army
- Years of service: 1863-1905
- Commands: Army Technical Bureau
- Battles/wars: Active service Bombardment of Kagoshima; Boshin War; Satsuma Rebellion; Reserve service First Sino-Japanese War; Russo-Japanese War

Murata Tsuneyoshi (村田 経芳; July 30, 1838 – February 9, 1921) was a Japanese samurai, swordsman, marksman, firearm inventor, gunsmith, soldier, and Army officer. He also used the names Yūemon (勇右衛門) and Keizaemon (勁左衛門).

== Biography ==
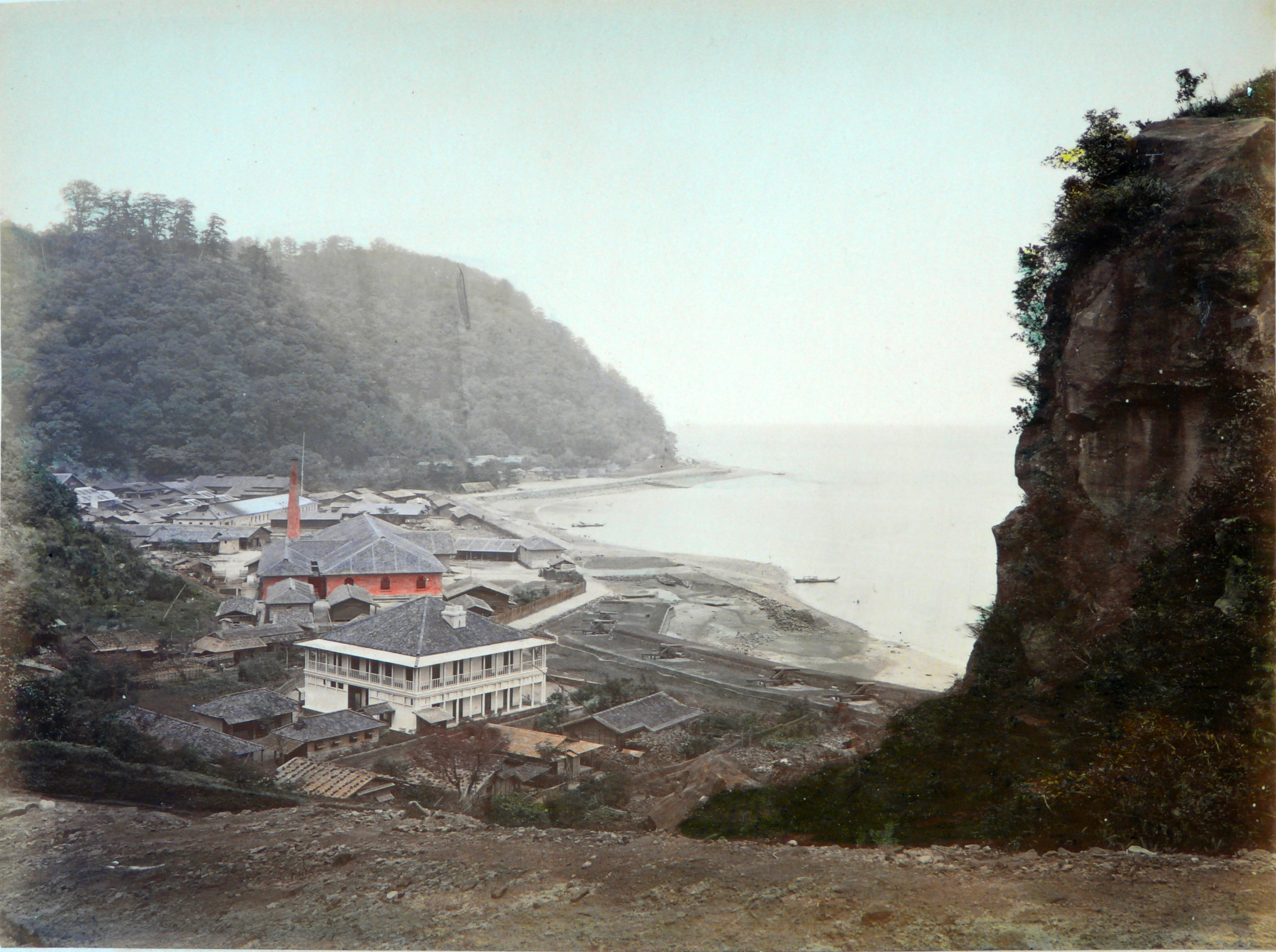
Satsuma Domain's Shūseikan industrial park in 1872 — the most advanced arsenal in Japan before 1871

He was born the eldest son of Murata Ransai Tsunenori (村田 蘭斎 経徳), a retainer of the Shimazu clan. In his youth he studied the Tachi school of swordsmanship, a derivative of Jigen-ryū, as well as the Takashima school of hōjutsu. He also studied Western gunnery.

Murata's first combat experience was during the Bombardment of Kagoshima by the Royal Navy in 1863. During this battle, Murata was strongly impressed by the British guns, and began to research contemporary European firearms technology. He studied using European books he acquired from Nagasaki. In early 1865, Murata presented to the Satsuma authorities his own design for a bolt-action rifle. This was an astonishing feat for an inventor educated in a medieval society, as the bolt-action was then a state-of-the-art technology even in Europe. However, Satsuma rejected his design because it was considered to be beyond the limited manufacturing capacity of the Satsuma arsenals. Murata continued to refine his initial design for more than a decade.

Murata joined the revolutionary Imperial Japanese Army at the outbreak of the Boshin War, and rapidly developed a reputation as one of the best marksmen in the army. During the war, Murata led the 1st Rural Unit (外城一番隊, Tojō ichibantai), a sniper fireteam contributed by the Satsuma forces and made up of men recruited from Satsuma's tojō system. Engagements in which Murata was involved included the battles of Toba-Fushimi, Bonari Pass, and Aizu. Among the Western-made firearms captured from the Shogunate army, Murata was especially impressed with the Sharps rifle and equipped the 1st Rural Unit with it. In 1871, he was assigned to the Imperial Guard in Tokyo where he became a captain (大尉, taii).

Murata became good friends with Cpt. Armand Echemann, an officer of the French Army who visited Japan in 1872 as part of the second French military mission to that country.

In 1875, he was sent to Europe to study modern firearms technology and gunnery techniques. During his tour, he visited, among others, France, Germany, Holland, Switzerland, the United Kingdom, and Sweden–Norway. Murata first visited France, and was received courteously through the offices of his friend Echemann. When he showed his 1865 rifle design to French officers, they told him it was very similar to the Dutch Beaumont rifle. However, local authorities found pretexts to prevent him from visiting manufacturing facilities due to a prevailing fear of arms development in Asia. In Germany, despite being snubbed at the Spandau Arsenal, Murata participated in a military marksmanship competition which he won. In England as well Murata won marksmanship competitions in Aldershot and Bristol. He also purchased a Whitworth rifle there. After visiting Switzerland, Murata returned to France and won a championship marksmanship competition in Marseille. Despite the obstruction, he was somehow able to acquire at least one Gras rifle and Beaumont rifle and studied their mechanical and ergonomic designs. In 1877, after returning to Japan, he was promoted to major (少佐, shōsa) and participated in the suppression of the Satsuma Rebellion. In 1880, he developed Japan's first indigenously produced standardized service rifle, the single-shot Murata rifle. Around that time, Murata built a summer house in Ōiso, Kanagawa Prefecture.

Murata's rifle featured a firing pin actuated by a simple but powerful leaf spring, a somewhat antiquated design compared to the more complex coil springs used in most bolt-action mechanisms of the time. This feature it shared with the Beaumont rifle. It is unknown why Murata chose this type of spring, but a number of reasons have been suggested. Japanese gunsmiths already had centuries of experience manufacturing leaf springs for the matchlock firing mechanisms of tanegashima arquebuses, and Murata's own training in traditional gunnery had likely familiarized him with the mechanical aspects of the centuries-old matchlock.

At the Koishikawa Arsenal in the early 1880s, Murata oversaw the manufacturing of the first Murata rifles to be distributed to the Japanese armed forces. Many units were personally inspected by him, and early production models were stamped with his kakihan (書き判) or monogram. The first Murata rifles were made using steel imported from France, and technicians from Germany were hired to teach the art of drawing brass cartridge cases. Much of the machinery for mass producing early 11x60mm Murata cartridges was procured by the Japanese government from the Winchester Repeating Arms Company.

== Later life ==
In 1890, he was promoted to major general (少将, shōshō) and transferred to the reserve. On June 5, 1896, he was created a baron (男爵, danshaku) for his military service in the Boshin War and Satsuma Rebellion. Murata's research on firearm design was taken over by his student Arisaka Nariakira. Murata remained in reserve throughout the First Sino-Japanese and Russo-Japanese Wars, but did not play an active role.

In 1891, Murata collaborated with the hunter Jūmonji Shinsuke (十文字 伸介) of the Kanemaru Kenjirō Gun Shop (金丸健二郎商店) on Japan's first published book on modern Western-style hunting, the New Illustrated Book of Rifle Hunting (傍訓図解銃猟新書, Bōkun zukai jūryō shinsho).

Privately, Murata was an avid practitioner of precision target shooting. In his later years, he often travelled to Europe to participate in long range shooting competitions where he won a number of championships.

He died of liver failure in 1921 at the age of 83.

== Murata's guntō ==
Murata was involved in the development of early guntō. Murata assessed that Japanese swordsmanship was generally more versatile than European swordsmanship and would therefore remain useful in modern warfare. In 1919, Murata gave a lecture titled The Spirit of the Sword (刀剣の精神; Tōken no seishin) at a generals' conference.

[...] Originally, a good sword had to have three critical elements (三要素) — being resistant to shattering, resistant to bending, and the ability to maintain an edge. However, a sword with these three elements is often [prohibitively] expensive, and so it is difficult for anyone to obtain one.

[...] The reason why new swords are generally inferior to old swords is that as time has gone by, many swords were [deliberately] made to resemble great swords of the past. [...] The same is true of human beings. There are those who, lacking in knowledge and self-discipline, delusionally imitate great people — using the model of a so-called tiger, but ending up with something that looks more like a cat. People sometimes get caught up on mere style, but this fashion-consciousness is a sign of weakness because in so doing they are imitating only the superficial features without having a solid and steadfast spirit beneath. This is [...] why there are no longer many great swords. There are indeed some truly excellent examples among the new swords, but [they] are generally inferior

[...] I decided to collect good specimens of old swords. At the time, I wasn't thinking in terms of superiority or inferiority, and I decided to focus on pieces by Magoroku Kanemoto of Seki. I collected sixty-four pieces, hoping to collect up to a hundred if possible. In the beginning I was cheated and they sold me a counterfeit, but as I gradually gained experience I was able to distinguish the genuine articles [from the fakes]. [...] By the way, the reason I originally set out to collect a hundred swords wasn't to equip the Battōtai. It's just because Kanemotos are very practical swords.

[...] On further reflection, I realized that it would be pointless to collect a hundred swords, and so I used the remaining funds for the other thirty-six swords to start developing [my own] sword with the three critical elements.

[...] A company officer, especially in the close combat that is the Japanese Army's forte, needs a practical sword. However, [we found that] practical swords were not always readily available. Therefore, I wanted to make it easy to obtain a guntō with the three critical elements.

[...] After much research and effort, I went to the arsenal to select Western steel [for my sword]. The Ōkura-gumi had just delivered some imported ferrite, but it failed the inspection and was rejected. When I took a look at it, this ferrite looked very similar in all respects to ferrite I had seen at the famous German sword factory in Solingen. I tried forging a sword out of it, and it turned out very well indeed. Then I tried using it for bayonets at the small arms factory, and the bayonets made from it at the time cut very well. [Because this imported ferrite was inexpensive] I was able to manufacture a guntō with the three critical elements at no great cost. Everyone was able to acquire one, and it was used as a practical guntō during the Sino-Japanese War and the Russo-Japanese War. They called it the Murata-tō (村田刀).

== Family ==
Murata Tsuneyoshi's great-grandson was the scholar of German literature Murata Tsunekazu (1930-2011), married to Murata Ingeborg (村田 インゲボルグ) (b. 1941), a professor at the Tokyo University of Agriculture and Technology. Murata Tsunekazu is known for his studies of Thomas Mann. Another descendant is Murata Tonio (村田 統二雄).

== See also ==
- Hino Kumazō
- Dōgane Giichi
- Iwashita Kenzō (????–????)
- Kawamura Masaya (1906–1994)
- Kawaguchiya Firearms Company

== Bibliography ==
- 鈴木 Suzuki, 氏亨 Shikō (1942). 村田銃発明物語 Murata-jū hatsumei monogatari. Japan: 教養社 Kyōyōsha.
