= Murata rifle =

Japanese service rifle

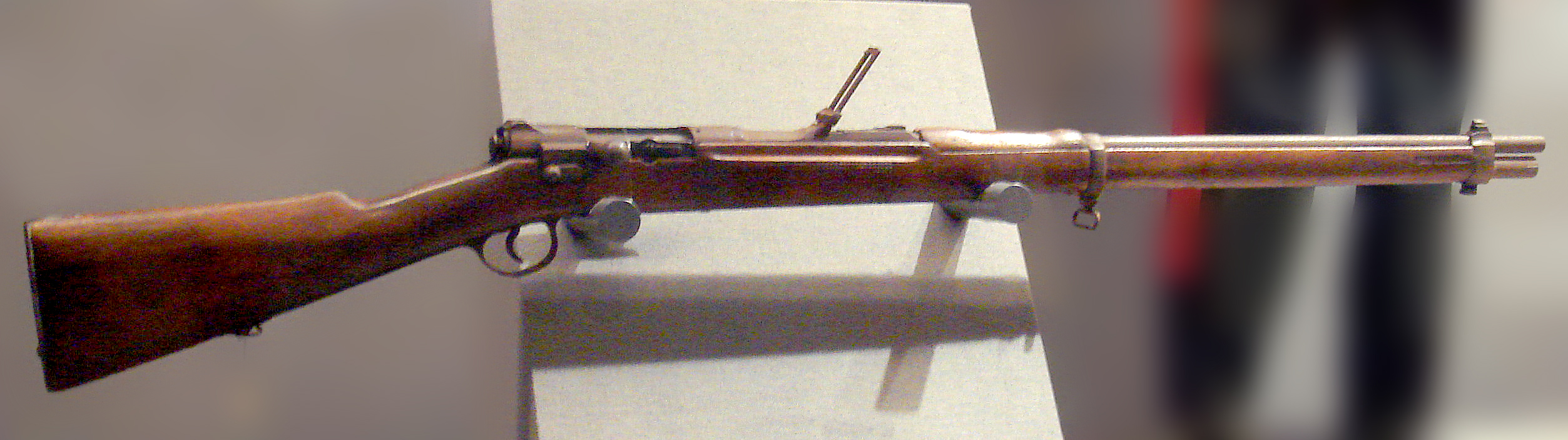
- Type 22 Murata repeating rifle
- Type: Bolt-action rifle
- Place of origin: Empire of Japan

Service history
- In service: 1880–1919
- Used by: See Users
- Wars: Donghak Peasant Revolution; First Sino-Japanese War; Boxer Rebellion; Russo-Japanese War; World War I Siberian Expedition

Production history
- Designed: 1880
- Produced: 1880–1905
- Variants: Type 13; Type 16 carbine Type 18; Type 22 repeater Type 22 carbine repeater Experimental box magazine repeater Murata grenade launcher Civilian models

The Murata rifle (村田銃, Murata jū) was the first indigenously produced Japanese service rifle adopted in 1880 as the Meiji Type 13 Murata single-shot rifle. The 13 referred to the adoption date, the year 13 in the Meiji period according to the Japanese calendar.

== Development ==
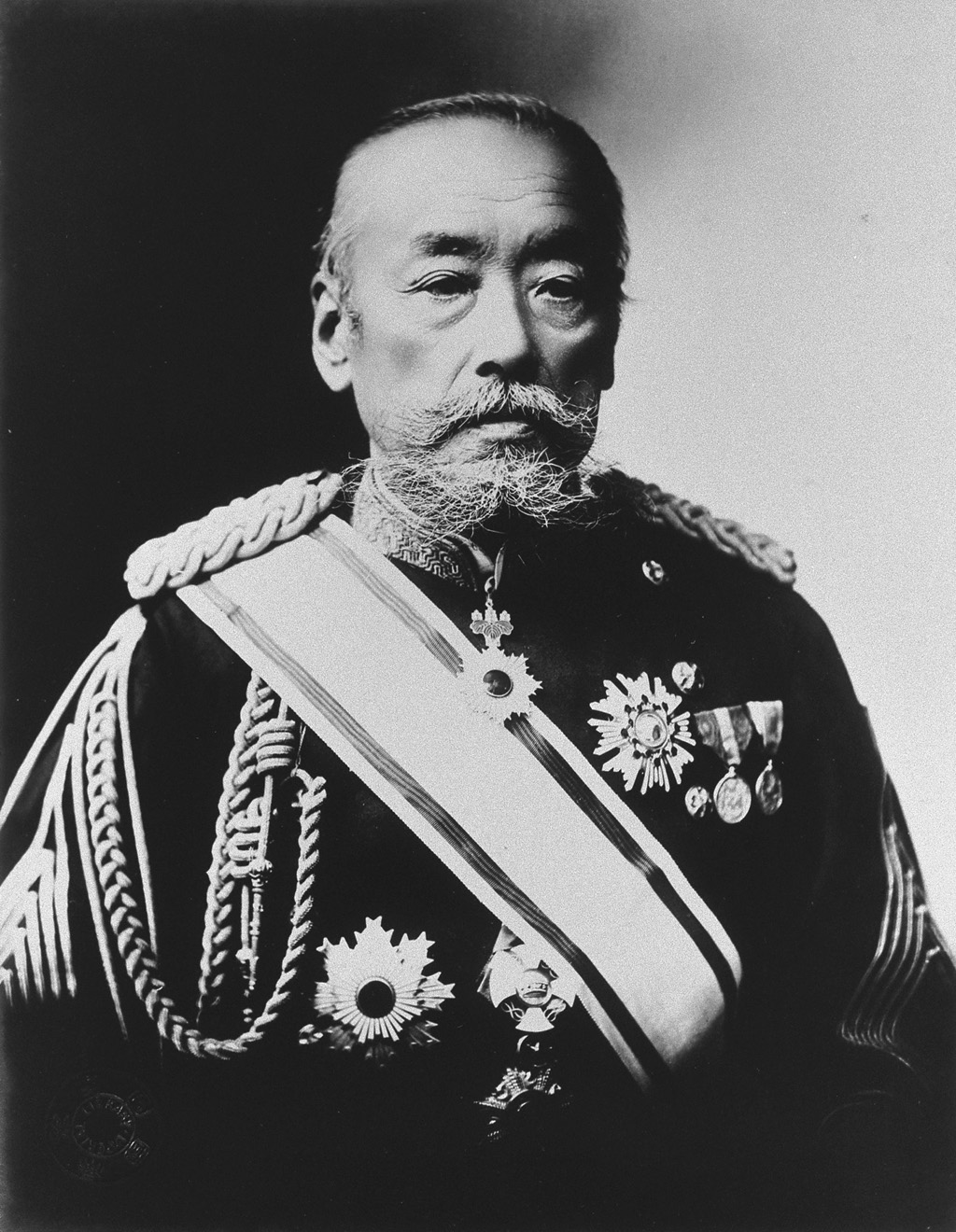
Murata Tsuneyoshi, the inventor of the Murata rifle.

The development of the weapon was lengthy as it involved the establishment of an adequate industrial structure to support it. Before producing local weapons, the early Imperial Japanese Army had been relying on various imports since the time of the Boshin War, and especially on the French Chassepot, the British Snider-Enfield and the American Spencer repeating rifle. This was about 300 years after Japan developed its first guns, derived from Portuguese matchlock designs, the Tanegashima or "Nanban guns".

The combat experience of the Boshin War emphasized the need for a standardized design, and the Japanese Army was impressed with the metallic-cartridge design of the French Gras rifle. The design was invented by Major Murata Tsuneyoshi, an infantry major in the Imperial Japanese Army who had survived the Boshin War and subsequently travelled to Europe. Adopted in Emperor Meiji's thirteenth year of reign, the rifle was designated as the model 13 and went into production as the 11-millimeter Type 13 single-shot, bolt-action rifle in 1880. The original 11-millimeter Murata cartridge used an approximately 6-millimeter Boxer-type primer filled with mercury fulminate.

Superficial improvements such as components, bayonet lugs, and minor configurations led to the redesignation of the Type 13 to the Type 18 rifle in 1885. Further modifications in the same year involving both tubular and box magazines led to the Type 22 rifle, which used a tubular magazine and was reduced to caliber 8mm. The Type 22 was the first Japanese military rifle to utilize smokeless powder and entered military service in 1889.

The Murata rifle was accurate and mechanically reliable, and was noted for functioning well in cold weather. However, it suffered from relatively soft steel of mediocre quality. The bolt assembly in particular had a number of design flaws that necessitated frequent maintenance. It has been unfavorably described as a "poor man's Beaumont".

Three models of bayonets were produced for the rifles: Type 13 and Type 18 which were used with the single-shot variants and Type 22 which were compatible with the repeater variants.

== Combat history ==
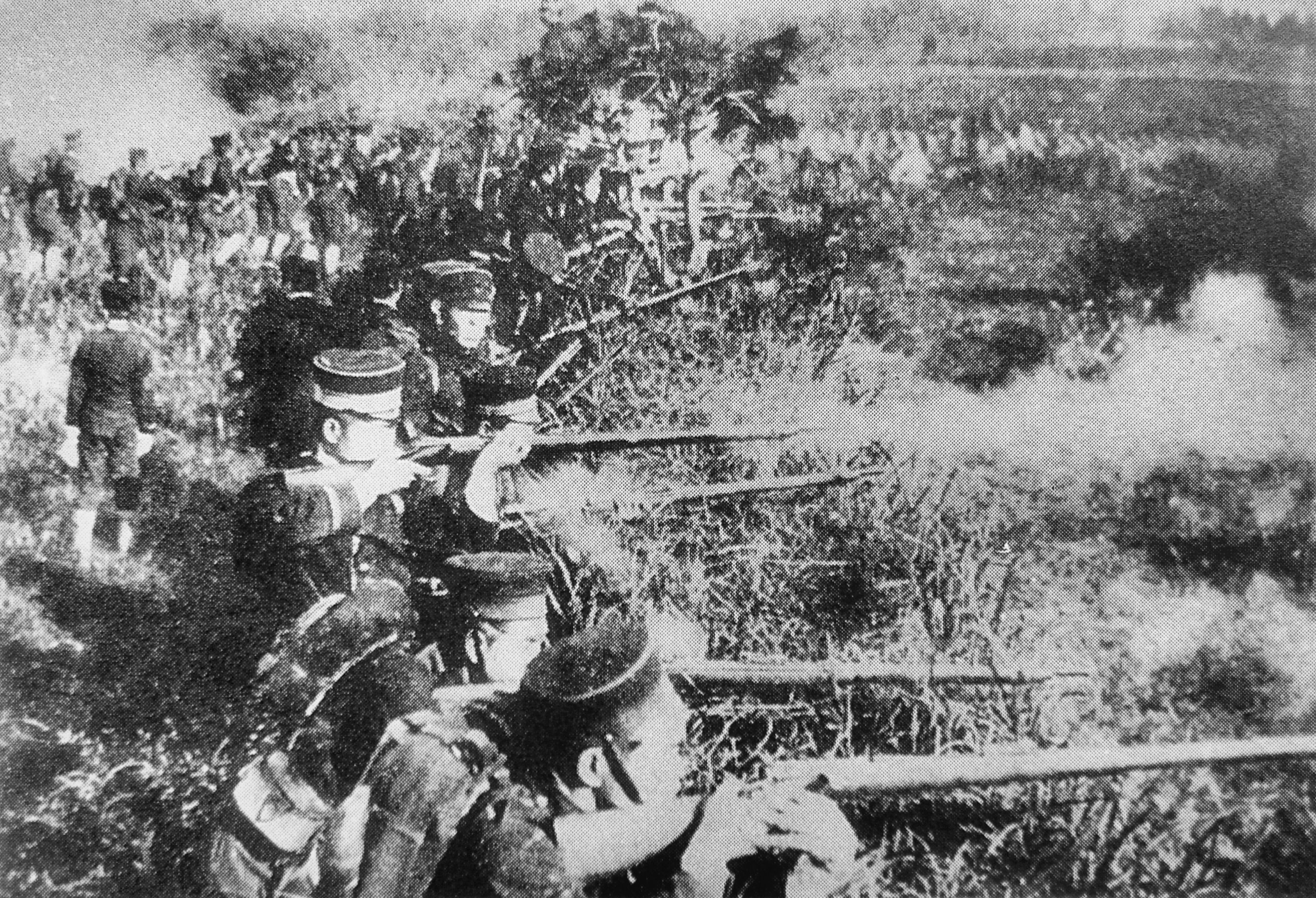
Japanese soldiers during the First Sino-Japanese War, equipped with Murata rifles.

During the First Sino-Japanese War only two divisions of the Imperial Japanese Army were equipped with the Type 22 rifle, while the rest were equipped with obsolete single-shot versions of the Murata. The Type 22 was also used during the Boxer Rebellion.

The Imperial Japanese Army was quick to recognize that the design of even the improved Type 22 version of the Murata rifle had many technical issues and flaws. Following the combat experience of the First Sino-Japanese War, a decision was made to replace it with the Arisaka Type 30 rifle, which had been designed in 1898, and which also used the more modern smokeless powder. The rifle performed well in any situation and terrain. However, due to insufficient production, many of the reserve infantry units sent to the front-lines during the latter stages of the Russo-Japanese War of 1904–1905 continued to be equipped with the Murata Type 22 rifle. Type 18 rifles converted into rifle grenade launchers were used during the Siege of Tsingtao during World War I and the Japanese intervention in Siberia alongside converted Type 38 Arisaka rifles.

Filipino revolutionaries were looking for a possible purchase of weapons and the Murata rifle from Japan was usually proposed. This was to be acquired through arms smuggling under a supposed loan. There was some indication that unnamed personalities were arrested on suspicions of trying to acquire them from Japan.

Andres Bonifacio and Mariano Ponce sought to acquire Murata rifles via the Japanese silviculturist Nakamura Yaroku to equip the Katipunan in order to match the firepower used by Spanish and American colonial forces in the Philippines. The rifles were shipped from Japan with the approval of Kawakami Soroku on the Nunobiki Maru. However, the ship was destroyed in a typhoon off the coast of Taiwan. There was reportedly at least one Murata rifle that was captured by American troops in the Philippines.

While never serving in combat during World War 2, many conscripts of the Japanese Volunteer Fighting Corps were equipped with these and many other antiquated firearms.

== Variants ==
Murata Type 13 infantry rifle
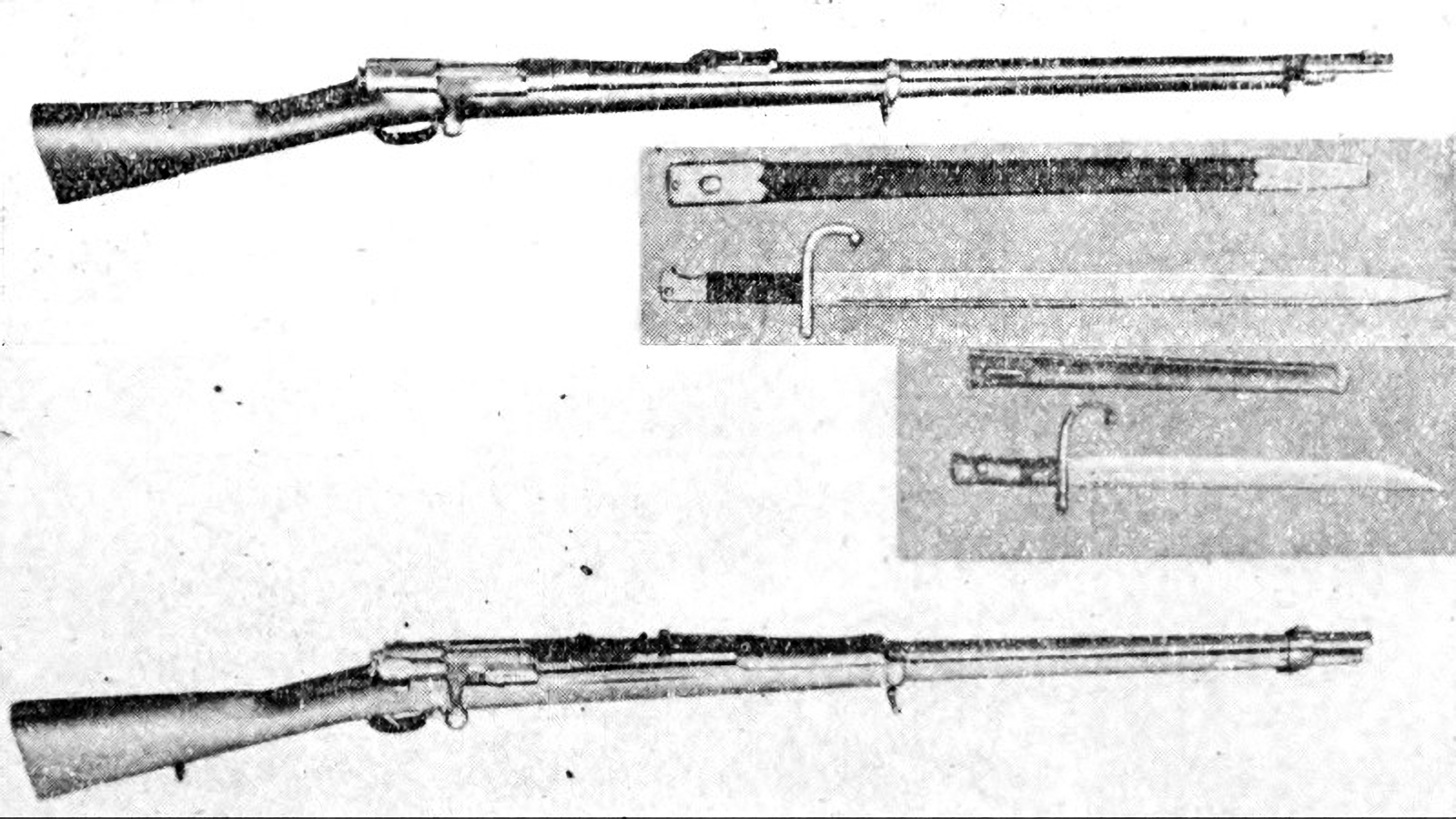
- Murata Type 18 rifle (top) with Murata Type 22 carbine (bottom)
- Type: Bolt-action rifle
- Place of origin: Empire of Japan

Service history
- Wars: Donghak Peasant Revolution; First Sino-Japanese War; Japanese Invasion of Taiwan (1895); Boxer Rebellion; Russo-Japanese War

Production history
- Designed: 1880 (Meiji 13)
- Manufacturer: Koishikawa Arsenal; Kokura Arsenal; Nagoya Arsenal
- No. built: Approx. 80,000

Specifications
- Mass: 4.62 kg (10.2 lb)
- Length: 1,294 mm (50.9 in)
- Barrel length: 840 mm (33 in)
- Cartridge: 11x60mmR Murata
- Caliber: 11mm (10.97mm)
- Action: Bolt-action
- Muzzle velocity: 437 m/s (1,430 ft/s)
- Maximum firing range: 1,800 m (2,000 yd)
- Feed system: Single-shot bolt-action

=== Prototype Murata rifle (1876) ===
Prototype using French steel. No markings aside from a serial number. Mechanically identical to the Type 13.

=== Murata Type 13 rifle (1880) ===
First model, single shot, 11x60mmR. According to Harriman, it was a hybrid of the Dutch M1871 Beaumont, the French Fusil Gras mle 1874 and the German Mauser Model 1871 actions. Like the Beaumont, the striker uses a V-shaped piece housed within the hollow bolt handle instead of a coil spring.

=== Murata Type 16 carbine (1883) ===
Derived from Type 13, mechanically identical .

=== Type 18 rifle (1885) ===
Improved internal mechanisms and ergonomics. Incorporates design improvements suggested by William Mason and William W. Wetmore of the Winchester Repeating Arms Company. Most were apparently converted into rifle grenade launchers.

=== Experimental box magazine repeater (1887) ===
Prototype for a box magazine version of the later repeater that was not adopted. Strangely marked in French "fusil à répétition Mourata [...] à 5 coups [...] année 1887". Five-round box magazine. Very similar to a proposed box-magazine conversion of the Winchester Hotchkiss.

=== Type 22 repeating rifle (1889) ===
Smaller caliber repeater. Tube magazine, capacity of eight rounds. According to Harriman, the Type 22 was modified version of the Austro-Hungarian Kropatschek rifle and the tubular magazine was slow to reload.

=== Type 22 repeating carbine (1889) ===
Carbine's magazine holds five rounds. Structurally similar to Type 22 rifle.

=== Murata grenade launcher ===
Some retired single-shot Type 13 and 18 Murata rifles were converted to fire rifle grenades. In this conversion, the rifling appears to have been removed. Experiments were also conducted with rifle-launched rockets.

=== Civilian Murata rifles, Murata shotguns ===
Usually retired Type 13s and Type 18s. Some retired military rifles converted to bolt action shotguns via removal of bayonet lugs and rifling. A cut down stock was also common, though some civilian Murata rifles retained lugs, rifling, and old stock. The Kawaguchiya Firearms Company (川口屋林銃砲火薬店) or K.F.C. and its subsidiaries manufactured single-shot Murata-action rifles and shotguns well into the 20th century.

== Users ==
- Empire of Japan
- Korean Empire: Japan supplied 200 Murata Type 13 rifles to the Korean government for the 80 Pyŏlgigun.
- Republic of China: Some Type 13s used by various warlord armies, especially the pro-Japanese Fengtian Army.
- Manchukuo: Used by second-line units and local constabulary forces
- Mengjiang: Used by second-line units and local constabulary forces
- (First Philippine Republic) Philippine Republic: Used by the Filipino Army in small numbers. One Murata rifle was reportedly captured by US troops in the Philippines.
- Qing Empire: Used by the New Army.

== See also ==
- Mauser Model 1871
- Jarmann M1884
- Remington–Keene rifle
- Matagi
- Tanegashima

== Bibliography ==
- Harriman, Bill (2019). The Arisaka Rifle. Bloomsbury Publishing. ISBN 978-1-4728-1613-9.
- Honeycutt, Fred L. Jr., and Anthony, Patt F. Military Rifles of Japan. Fifth Edition, 2006. Palm Beach Gardens, Fla.: Julin Books. ISBN 0-9623208-7-0.
- Jowett, Philip (2013). China's Wars: Rousing the Dragon 1894-1949. Bloomsbury Publishing. ISBN 978-1-4728-0674-1.

| Preceded by Tanegashima Matchlock; Imported Rifles | Imperial Japanese Army Service Rifle; 1880–1905 | Succeeded by Arisaka |
