= Mille Bornes =

French designer card game

- Modern edition
- Manufacturers: Winning Moves
- Designers: Edmond Dujardin
- Illustrators: Joseph Le Callennec
- Publication: 1954
- Genres: Take That
- Languages: English / French
- Skills: Medium
- Media type: 106 cards

Mille Bornes (/ˌmɪl ˈbɔːrn/; French for a thousand milestones, referring to the distance markers on many French roads) is a French designer card game. Mille Bornes is listed in the GAMES Magazine Hall of Fame.

== History ==
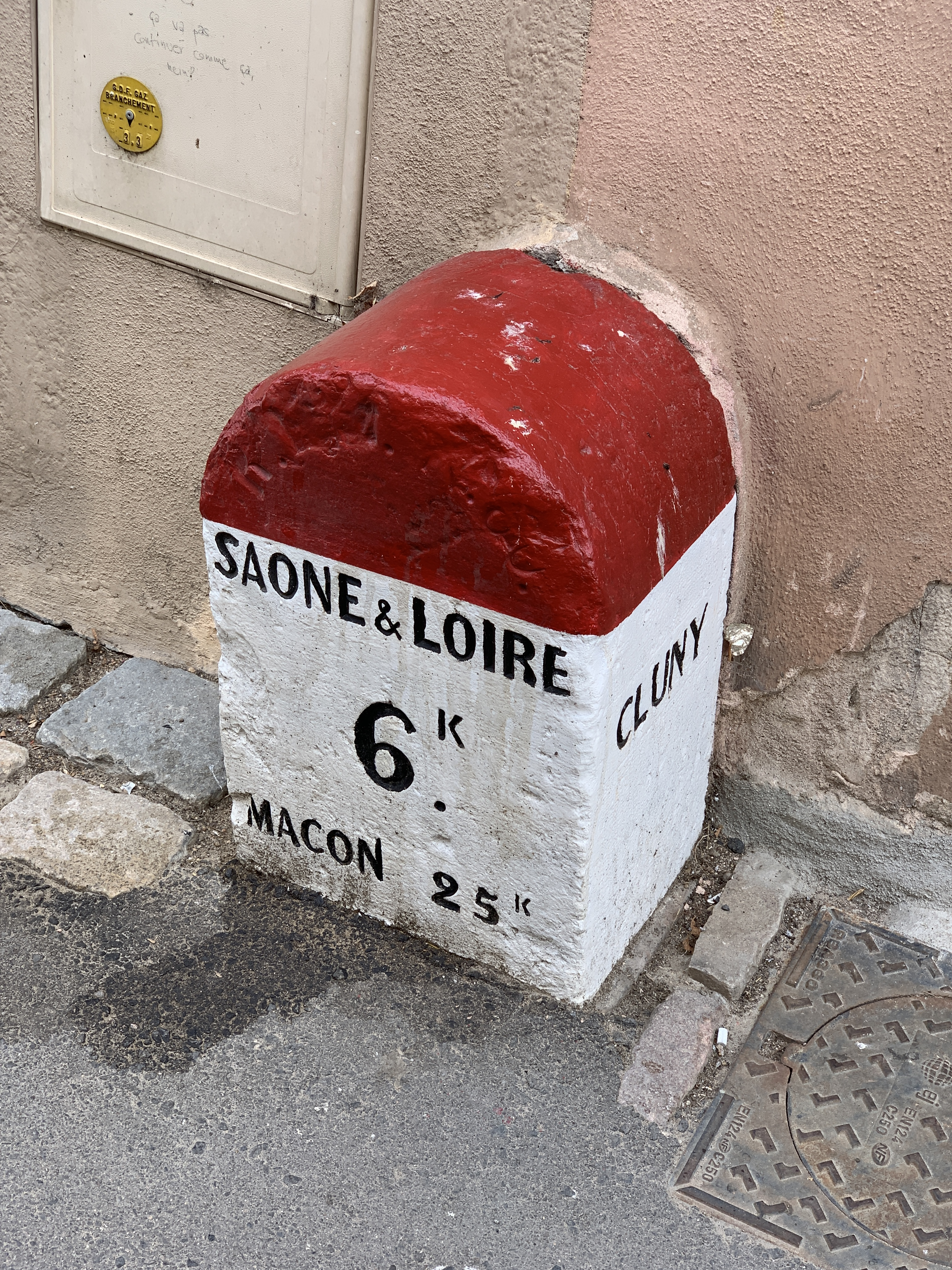
A kilometer marker (borne) in Cluny, France

The game was created in 1954 by Edmond Dujardin as 1000 Bornes. It is almost identical to the earlier American automotive card game Touring, designed by William Janson Roche in 1906. One additional feature is the coup-fourré ("counter-thrust"), whereby bonus points are earned by holding back a safety card (such as the puncture-proof tire) until an opponent plays the corresponding hazard card (in this case, the flat tire). The game's name is derived from the approximate length of the RN 7 (a national route) connecting Paris with the Italian border.

Dujardin moved to Arcachon southwest of Bordeaux on the Atlantic coast of France in 1947, where he and his family began producing the game in the basement of his house at No. 63, Boulevard de la Plage. The box for the original 1954 edition carries the strapline la Canasta de la Route ("Canasta of the Road"), highlighting its similarity to Canasta. The cards are illustrated and hand-lettered by Joseph Le Callennec, a graphic designer from France. Due to demand, production was moved to a former fish cannery in Arcachon. A revised version was released in 1960, with updated artwork from Le Callennec; in addition a "special edition" was released with more abstract artwork from Pierre Praquin. With canasta having fallen out of favor, the regular 1960 edition advertised its connection to bridge: the rulebook included an introduction written by Pierre Albarran, and the game was billed as a favorite of world champions Pierre Jaïs and Roger Trézel. Dujardin began international distribution in the same year with bilingual cards.

Parker Brothers, who held the license to distribute Touring in the United States, acquired a license for Mille Bornes in 1962 and began publishing its version in America with updated cover art; the game used the same bilingual cards from the 1960 Dujardin regular edition. Mille Bornes was very popular in the United States, at one point outselling Monopoly. Parker Brothers updated the box/cover art again in 1971, and introduced a more comprehensive revision in 1982 with significantly simplified artwork for the cards. In the mid-1970s, the Dujardin company moved its headquarters slightly south to La Teste-de-Buch, but the company went bankrupt in 1980. It was then taken over by a joint-venture set up by Schmidt Spiele (Munich) and a French businessman, Arthur Sarfati. All Dujardin games were rebranded as 'Schmidt International'. However, Schmidt had problems in Germany and, in 1985, decided to withdraw from the joint-venture. The Sarfati family trust (Regain-Galore) became sole owner of the Dujardin games, which were finally returned to their original brand. The headquarters in La Teste were moved to Cestas, 10 miles from Bordeaux, in 2009 shortly after the company was acquired by TF1 Games in 2007. Dujardin, who has produced the game continuously since 1954, did so in Saint-Pantaléon-de-Larche, which is north of Toulouse. In 2021 Dujardin was acquired by Jumbo Games and the production at Saint-Pantaléon-de-Larche was discontinued. The company’s headquarters, though, remain in Cestas.

There have been 26 known publishers of the game in all markets. Some Mille Bornes decks are printed in both English and French. The Spanish version Mil Hitos, distributed by Heraclio Fournier, was very popular in Spain during the 1970s. In the Netherlands there is a predecessor to this game, Stap op, marketed as early as 1939, which deals with cycling instead of driving. The hazards and distances are different, but the mechanics of the game are exactly the same.

The current U.S. version, published by Asmodee, a French manufacturer of games, has removed all French language from the printed cards. The rules still include the "Coup Fourré"; however there is no explanation given for the "counter thrust" translation.

== Objective ==
The premise of Mille Bornes is the players are in a road race. Each race—or hand—is 1000 miles (or kilometers) long. For two- or three-player games the goal is shortened to 700, with an option for the first player to complete that distance to declare an extension to 1000 miles. Mille Bornes is played with a special deck of cards. There are hazard, remedy, safety, and distance cards. Each hazard is corrected by a corresponding remedy, and can be prevented from happening in the first place by a corresponding safety. The target distance is reached by playing distance cards.

== List of cards ==
Cards (and quantities) in Mille Bornes
Hazards (18)		Remedies (38)		Safeties (4)		Distance (46)	
Accident (Accident)	3	Repairs (Réparations)	6	Driving Ace (As du volant)	1	25	10
Out of Gas (Panne d'essence)	3	Gasoline (Essence)	6	Extra Tank (Citerne d'essence)	1	50	10
Flat Tire (Pneu crevé)	3	Spare Tire (Roue de secours)	6	Puncture Proof (Increvable)	1	75	10
Stop (Stop)	5	Go/Roll/Drive (Roulez)	14	Right of Way / Emergency Vehicle (Véhicule prioritaire)	1	100	12
Speed Limit (Limite de vitesse)	4	End of Speed Limit (Fin de limite de vitesse)	6	Right of Way / Emergency Vehicle (Véhicule prioritaire)	1	200	4

The deck has 106 playable cards. Some versions of the game include non-playable cards which list the playable cards and summarize the scoring. In some decks, some of these are printed entirely in French.

== Play ==
Typical Mille Bornes Tableau; the player has traveled 725 km, has a Roll and a Speed Limit in effect, and has played the Driving Ace and Extra Tank safeties, the latter as a coup-fourré

The deck is shuffled and six cards are dealt to each player; the remainder becomes a draw pile and a discard pile forms next to it. Each player's turn begins with a draw of one card and a play of one card, so each player always holds six cards at the end of their turn. The game is typically played with four players divided into two teams.

=== Player tableau ===
Each player (or team) builds a tableau to display the cards played to the other player(s) or team. In the four-player, two-team game, two players are responsible for a single tableau. The example shows a single typical tableau midway through a hand. The tableau is divided into battle, speed, distance, and safety areas; cards in the battle and speed areas are stacked so only the top card shows.

- Hazards and Remedies (with the exception of the Speed Limit Hazard and End of Limit Remedy) are played in the battle area. In the example, a Roll card is shown.
- Speed Limit and End of Limit cards are played separately in the speed area. In the example, a speed limit has been imposed on the player, which means the player cannot play distance cards greater than 50-km.
- Distance cards are played in the distance area and organized into separate stacks according to value so all players can see their opponents' distance traveled. It is common to play any 200 km cards apart from one another, rather than fanning them as in other columns.
- Safety cards are played in the safety area along the top of the tableau. In the example shown, the horizontal placement of the Extra Tank card indicates it has been played as a coup-fourré.

=== Legal actions ===
During their turn, each player may use a card, depending on its type:

- Roll:
  - If the player's (or team's) battle area is empty or showing any remedy other than Roll, the Roll card may be played in their battle area.
- Distance:
  - If a Roll card is showing in the player's (or team's) battle area, a distance card may be played in their distance area.
  - If a Speed Limit is showing in the player's speed area, only 25 and 50 km distance cards may be played.
  - No more than two 200 km distance cards may be played per player in a single hand.
  - The total distance cannot exceed the target value needed to win the hand.
- Remedy:
  - If a hazard is showing in the player's battle area, the corresponding remedy may be played on top of it.
  - If any remedy other than Roll is showing in the player's battle area, a Roll must be played onto it before any distance cards can be played on subsequent turns.
  - If a Speed Limit is showing in the player's speed area, the End of Limit remedy may be played on top of it.
- Hazard:
  - If an opponent's battle area is not empty, any hazard except for Speed Limit may be played onto it.
  - If an opponent's speed area is empty or showing an End of Limit, a Speed Limit hazard may be played. This is the only hazard that can be played against an opponent whose battle area is empty.
  - If an opponent has played a safety, the corresponding hazard(s) may not be played against them for the remainder of the hand.
- Safety:
  - The player may play a safety in their own safety area, regardless of whether the corresponding hazard is currently in effect against the player.
  - The safety may be played immediately in response to the corresponding hazard, skipping intermediate players if necessary. This action is known as a coup-fourré.
  - The player is immune to the hazard(s) remedied by the safety card for the remainder of the hand.
- Discard:
  - The player may voluntarily discard a card, even if there are other legal actions available.
  - The player must discard a card if there are no other legal actions.
  - Discarded cards cannot be used again for the remainder of the hand.

The first player only has four available legal moves to start: Roll (on their own battle area), a safety (on their own safety area), Speed Limit (on an opponent's speed area), or discard. Starting with the second player, a hazard may be played against any player (or team) that has already played a Roll card. Once an Accident, Out of Gas, or Flat Tire hazard has been played, and the appropriate remedy card played to correct it, the player must next play a Roll card in order to get moving again, unless that player (or team) also has played the Right of Way safety card. A hazard can be played onto an opponent's battle area even if another one is already showing, but only the topmost hazard needs to be corrected before that player can use a Roll card; however, some rule variants prohibit multiple hazards and instead require that hazards can be played only against Roll cards. Playing a Roll against a Stop hazard corrects it and allows the player to start moving; a second Roll is not needed.

A player affected by a Speed Limit (as shown in the example) may only play 25 and 50 km cards until the End of Limit remedy has been played. A player (or team) may be attacked with both a road hazard (Accident, Out of Gas, or Flat Tire) and a Speed Limit hazard at the same time. No more than two 200 km cards may be played by any player or team in a single hand.

Whenever a safety is played, the same player draws another card immediately and plays again. It is possible to play consecutive safeties on one turn, each time drawing a card before playing again. Playing a safety may be done either to prevent or correct a corresponding hazard. In either case, once the safety is played, it prevents opponents from using the remedied hazard against that player (or team) for the remainder of the hand. When the safety is played preventively, it is placed in the conventional (portrait) orientation. Unless the player (or team) also has played the Right of Way safety, a Roll must still be played before any distance cards.

If the player (or team) that was attacked by a hazard is holding the corresponding safety, they may immediately play it (before drawing a card), regardless of whether or not it is their turn, and declare a coup-fourré. The safety is laid down horizontally in the safety area, and the hazard card that was played is removed to the discard pile. As required, the player who played the safety draws a new card and takes their normal turn (draw and play/discard), skipping all players between the attacker and the safety player. If the attacked player (or team) had the Roll card on top of their battle pile, since the hazard was removed by the coup-fourré action, the Roll card is exposed again and the attacked player (or team) may play a distance card.

The Right of Way/Emergency safety card remedies and protects against both Stop and Speed Limit hazards. If a player uses this safety, they need not play a Roll card in order to get moving again; any Stop or Speed Limit cards showing in the battle/speed areas are moved to the discard pile. The player is still vulnerable to any hazard for which they have not yet played a safety; however, after remedying it, they can begin to play distance cards again without using a Roll card first.

If an uncorrected hazard is revealed in the battle area due to the Right of Way or a coup-fourré being played, and the corresponding safety is not in effect, the hazard must be corrected (and a Roll played, if necessary) in order to start moving again. Players may always discard, even if they have a legal play available. A player who has no playable cards must discard. All discards are considered dead and may not be used or touched for the remainder of the hand.

=== Ending conditions ===
Play continues until either:

- one player (or team) has played enough distance cards to exactly reach the target total, or
- all players have played or discarded all their cards

Under no circumstances may a player or team play a distance card which causes them to exceed the target total.

Note play continues after the draw pile is exhausted, each player playing or discarding one card per turn. Once every player runs out of cards in their hand with a depleted draw pile, play ends.

The target distance is 1000 km in a four-handed game with two partnerships, or 700 km in a two- or three-player game with each player acting individually. In the latter case, the first player to reach 700 km may either claim victory and end the hand immediately, or call for an Extension that increases the target to 1000 km. If a player/team reaches the target distance after the draw pile is exhausted, they receive a "delayed action" scoring bonus for the hand.

=== Scoring ===
Scores are tallied at the end of the hand as follows:

Scored by each side
Distance	1	per km traveled
Each safety	100	however played
All 4 safeties	300	bonus in addition to the standard 100 points for each of the safeties individually plus any coup-fourré bonuses
Coup-fourré	300	bonus in addition to the 100 for playing that safety
Scored only by side that completes trip (if any)
Trip completed	400	for completing the trip; if the target was 700 km and extended to 1000 km, the amount is awarded to the first player to reach 1000 km, not the player who was first to reach 700 km and called for an Extension
Delayed action	300	for completing the trip after the draw pile is exhausted
Safe trip	300	for completing the trip without playing any 200 km cards
Extension	200	for completing the trip after calling for an Extension
Shutout	500	for completing a trip before the opponent has played any Distance cards

In a 2-player game, the maximum score that can be made in one hand is 4,600 points.In a standard 4-player/2-team game there is no extension, so the maximum score is 4,400. In a 3-player or 6-player/3-team game, two shutout bonuses are achievable, yielding a perfect score of 5,100.

Note some points are scored even if a side does not complete a trip; it is possible for the completing side to score fewer points than their opponents. If the hand ends by exhaustion rather than by completion, each side still scores its distance and safety points.

According to the printed rules distributed by Parker Brothers, a game continues until one or both sides reaches a cumulative point total of 5,000. If both sides go over 5,000 during the same hand, the higher point total wins the game. Note it is possible for the game to end in a tie, in which case the rules are silent.

If the game is played for money, then generally the point difference is paid from the loser to the winner, and every point is significant.

=== With larger or smaller groups ===
2, 3, 4 or 6 player play is possible with slight rule modifications and where in the case of the 4 or 6 player versions, players team up into teams of two each. For detailed play see Wikibooks article.

== Card images ==
Hazard cards

Accident (Accident)

Out of gas (Panne d'essence)

Flat tire (Pneu crevé)

Speed limit (Limite de vitesse)

Stop (Stop)
Remedy cards

Repairs (Réparations)

Gasoline (Essence)

Spare tire (Roue de secours)

End of limit (Fin de limite de vitesse)

Roll (Roulez)
Safety cards

Driving ace (As du volant)

Extra tank (Citerne d'essence)

Puncture proof (Increvable)

Right-of-way (Véhicule prioritaire)
Distance cards

25 km

50 km

75 km

100 km

200 km

== Reviews ==
- 1980 Games 100 in Games
- 1981 Games 100 in Games
- 1982 Games 100 in Games
- Family Games: The 100 Best

== See also ==
- Touring (card game)
- Grass (card game)
