= Grass (card game) =

Card game

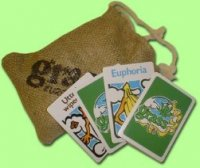
- Designers: Jeff London
- Publishers: Euro Games; Ventura International
- Players: 2-6
- Setup time: 1-2 Min
- Playing time: 30+Min
- Chance: High
- Age range: 13+
- Skills: Economic management, Strategic thought

Grass is a card game, first published in 1979 and now published by Euro Games and Ventura International (packaged in a hemp bag). The game is an expanded version of the 1954 game Mille Bornes (itself based on the 1906 game Touring) with the theme altered from car racing to cannabis dealing, with many of the cards essentially the same in their effects.

== Cards ==
- Peddle Cards are cards which make up the money in the game, indicating the sale of cannabis to a particular value. There are six types: Home Grown, Mexico, Colombia, Jamaica, Panama, and Dr. Feelgood. Each of these has a different monetary value.
- Heat on cards represent police activity and are made up of 4 different varieties: Bust, Detained, Felony, and Search and Seizure. A Heat on card played on another player's "Market open" card prevents that player from peddling cannabis (until the corresponding "Heat off" card is played).
- Heat off cards are made up of Immunity, Hearsay Evidence, Charges Dropped, and A Breeze To Fly. Any of these cards played on the corresponding "Heat on" card will remove the heat and enable the player to continue putting down peddle cards.
- Market open cards enables the player to add peddles of cannabis to their stash (provided there is no heat). In order to end the current hand/round, any player may play a "Market close" on their own "Market open" (provided there is no heat). The money for the round is totalled and a new hand is dealt to each player.
- Skim cards allow a player to steal peddle cards on the table from other players. Steal Your Neighbour's Pot allows the player to take any peddle card from another player, and The Banker allows the player to steal 20 percent of every player's unprotected tabled peddle money at the end of the round.
- Protection cards allow a player to protect their peddle cards against skim cards. There are three types: Grab a Snack ($25,000), Catch a Buzz ($25,000) and Lust Conquers All ($50,000). Dr Feelgood, the highest valued peddle card, may never be protected.
- Pay Fine cards function as heat off cards, but require the player to sacrifice a peddle card in their stash to play them.
- Nirvana Cards give bonuses to players. There are two types: Stonehigh and Euphoria. Either of these cards will provide extra turns (Stonehigh: 1 turn. Euphoria: 1 turn) and cancel any "heat on" card active on the player. In addition, the player receives a peddle card from every other player: Stonehigh requires every player to hand over their lowest tabled peddle, whereas Euphoria requires player to hand over their highest tabled peddle.
- Paranoia Cards give penalties to players. Each of these cards imposes a penalty on the player who plays it. However, if the cards are found unplayed in a player's hand at the end of a hand, a score penalty is assessed: ($25,000 for Sold out; $50,000 for Double Crossed; and $100,000 for Utterly Wiped Out), it is up to the player to decide which is worth less. Further, whenever any of these cards are played on the discard pile, each player must pass a card from their hand to their neighbour: this can allow the play of one of the less dangerous Paranoia cards to enable a player to pass on a more dangerous one. If these cards are played on a person's peddle pile, Sold out forces the player to skip a turn and lose their lowest peddle; Doublecrossed forces the player to skip two turns and lose their highest peddle; and Utterly Wiped Out forces the player to skip two turns and must put all tabled unprotected peddle cards on the wasted pile and must reopen with a new Market Open card.

== Reception ==
Games magazine included Grass in their "Top 100 Games of 1980", describing it as "the card game that Cheech and Chong have been waiting for".

Games magazine included Grass in their "Top 100 Games of 1981", describing it as "a game to get really silly with".

Games magazine included Grass in their "Top 100 Games of 1982", noting that the game was "invented by a retired policeman!" and that "Whether you're intrigued or in censed by the theme of dealing in marijuana, consider this: We know of no action card game that plays better."
