= Touring (card game) =

Specialty card game designed in 1906

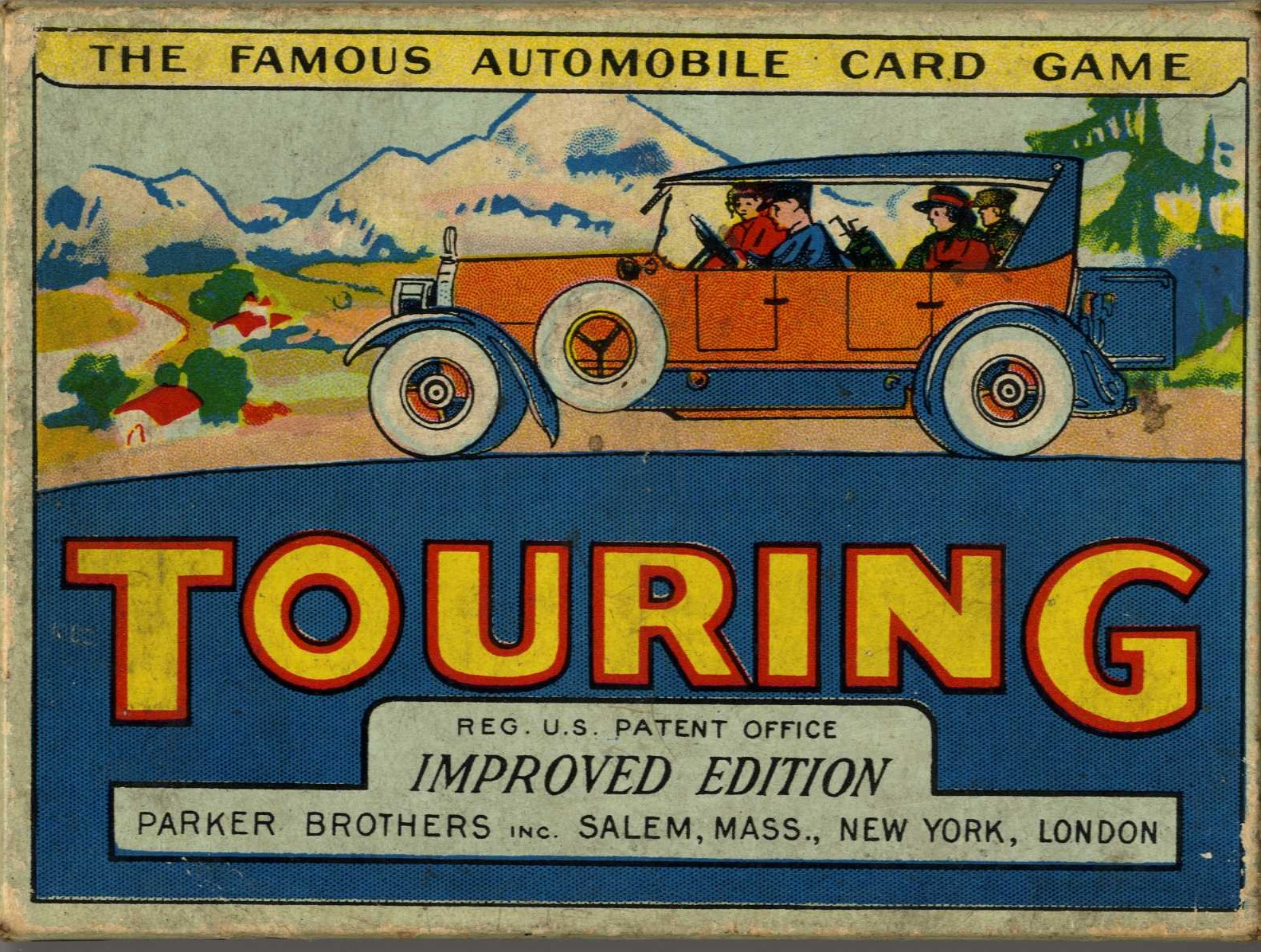
- 1926 "Improved Edition" by Parker Brothers Co.
- Manufacturers: Parker Brothers
- Designers: Wallie Dorr Co
- Publishers: Winning Moves; Parker Brothers
- Publication: 1906
- Years active: 1906–1976
- Genres: Take That
- Languages: English
- Players: 2, 3, 4 and 6
- Skills: Medium
- Media type: Cards

Touring is a specialty card game originally designed by William Janson Roche and patented by the Wallie Dorr Company and produced in 1906. It was acquired by Parker Brothers in 1925. It is widely believed the popular French card game Mille Bornes was derived from Touring. After several revisions, Touring was discontinued shortly after Parker Brothers picked up the American license of Mille Bornes. However, the game of Touring was reissued by Winning Moves in 2014.

== Updates to editions ==
The original Wallie Dorr edition was a small red box with 100 cards. They updated the game to a side-by-side wider box which Parker Bros used for their first edition of the game after they purchased it.

Periodically the Parker Bros. Co. adjusted the card art and subsequently, the images became more modern, and increased the mileage cards. Until the final edition, game play remained unchanged, just the denominations of miles increased as the trip length and comfort of automobile travel increased. The final edition reversed the trend, using artwork closer to the original Model-T-era cars and adjusting the card totals with an addition of two new delays.

== Original rules ==
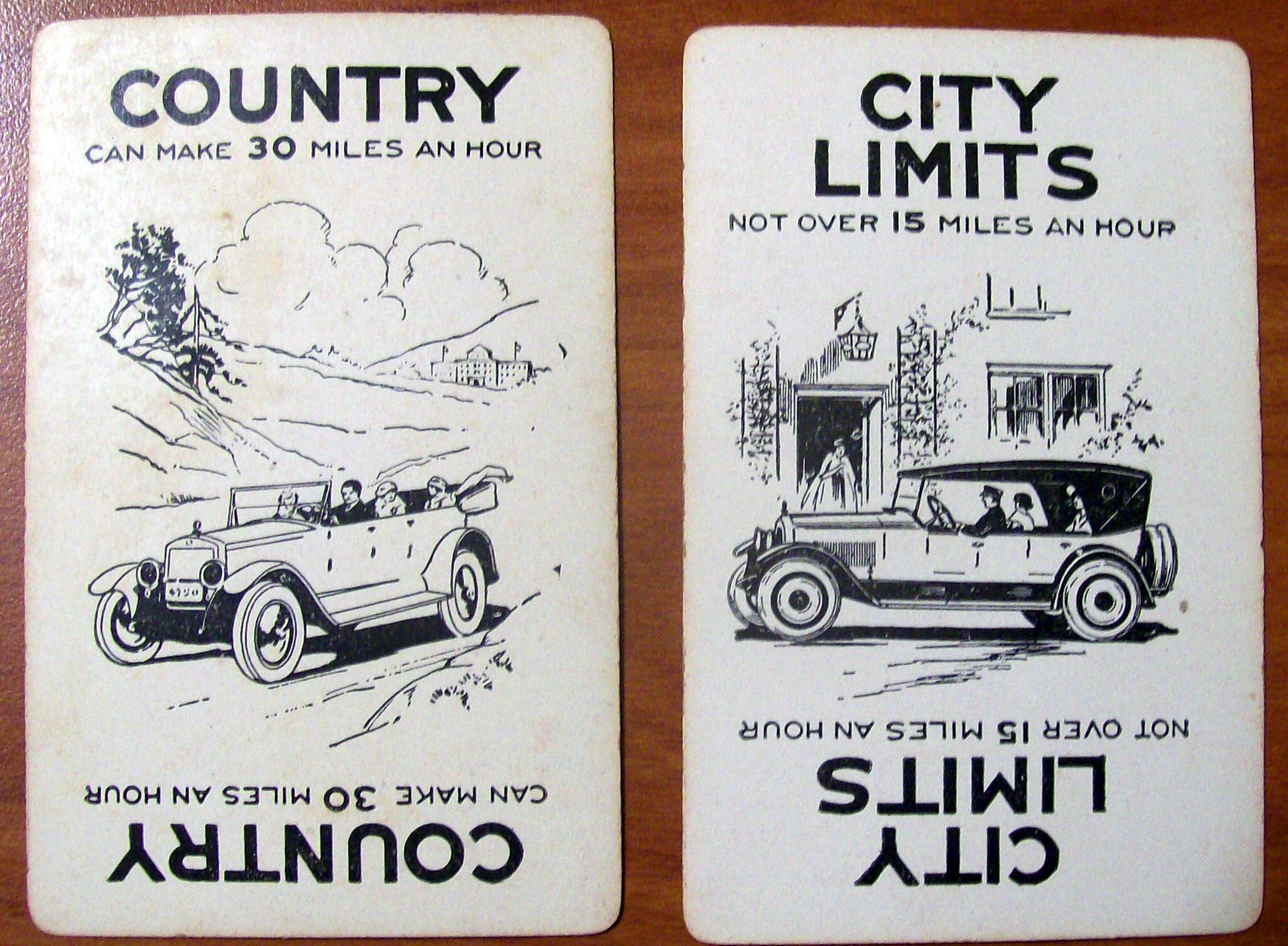
Two cards from the 1926 edition

The players run a race of 50 or 100 miles, as agreed before the game starts. A player cannot play the mileage cards (1, 3, 5, 10 Miles) unless they have a Go card in front of them. If both players are in City Limits (played by either), they can't play the 10 Mile card ("Speed Limit 5 Miles per Hour"); they can remove this card's effect by playing the Country! card (which affects both players). They lose 1 or 2 hours if an opponent plays a Collision ("Delay! 1 Hour"), Out of Gasoline ("Delay! 1 Hour"), or Puncture ("Delay! 2 Hours") card and must discard an "hour's" worth of cards for each hour (5 miles in the city, 10 miles in the country). To resume driving, they must also play a "Remedy" card (Hauled In for a collision and Gasoline for Out of Gasoline, nothing for Puncture) and a Go card. To win, the player must exactly match the total mileage (50 or 100 miles, as agreed).

== Play variant ==
In each copy of the directions were an option to play progressive touring, in which multiple tables of 4 would play simultaneously.

== Cards of select editions ==
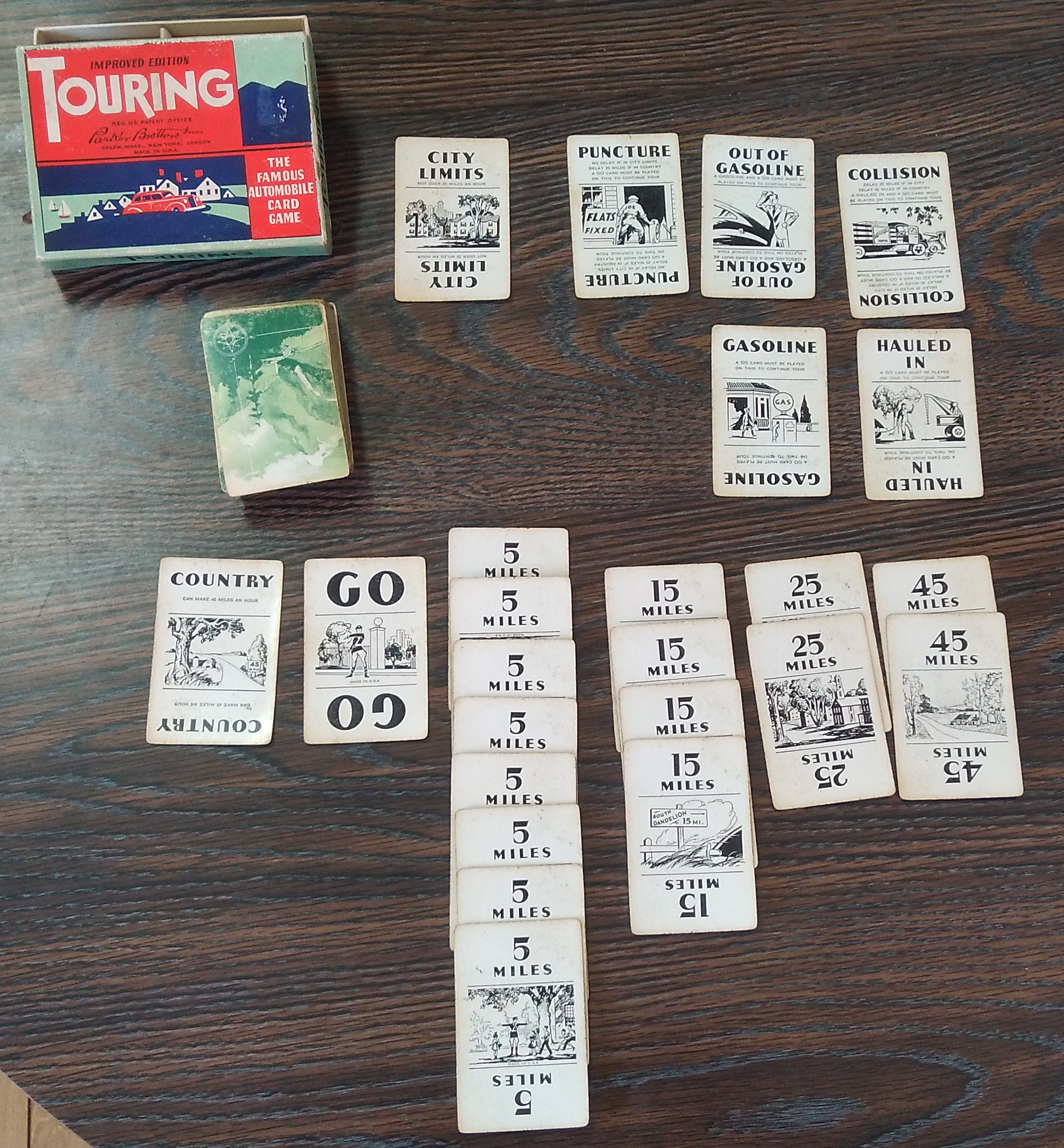
Winning tableau, as well as other cards and the game box. 1947–1957 edition

Edition (Card count)	Mileage		Delay		Remedy		Movement	
Edition (Card count)	Qty	Type	Qty	Type	Qty	Type	Qty	Type
1906 (100)	20	1 Mile	3	Collision	8	Hauled in	15	Go
1906 (100)	10	3 Miles	2	Puncture	8	Hauled in	15	Go
1906 (100)	10	5 Miles	3	Out of gasoline	8	Gasoline	15	Go
1906 (100)	12	10 Miles	4	City limits (Note: Also counted as a movement card.) (Note: Restricts playable mileage cards to the lower two denominations.)	5	Country (Note: Lifts restriction on playable mileage cards.)	15	Go
1937 (99)	19 (Note: Count reduced by 1 card compared to prior version)	1 Mile	3	Collision	8	Hauled in	15	Go
1937 (99)	10	3 Miles	2	Puncture	8	Hauled in	15	Go
1937 (99)	10	15 Miles (Note: Distance increased by 10 miles compared to prior version)	3	Out of gasoline	8	Gasoline	15	Go
1937 (99)	12	30 Miles (Note: Distance increased by 20 miles compared to prior version)	4	City limits	5	Country	15	Go
1957 (99)	19	5 Miles (Note: Distance increased by 4 miles compared to prior version)	3	Collision	8	Hauled in	15	Go
1957 (99)	10	15 Miles (Note: Distance increased by 12 miles compared to prior version)	2	Puncture	8	Hauled in	15	Go
1957 (99)	10	25 Miles	3	Out of gasoline	8	Gasoline	15	Go
1957 (99)	12	45 Miles (Note: Distance increased by 15 miles compared to prior version)	4	City limits	5	Country	15	Go
1965 (99)	19	25 Miles	3	Missed the Curve (Note: Several cards were retitled (Old → New): Collision → Missed the Curve; Out of Gas → Stopped to Refuel; Puncture → Broken Spring; Hauled In → Wrecker; City Limits → Populated Area; Country → Freeway)	7	Wrecker	13 (Note: Count reduced by 2 cards compared to prior version)	Go
1965 (99)	10	35 Miles	2	Broken Spring	7	Wrecker	13	Go
1965 (99)	10	50 Miles (Note: Distance increased by 25 miles compared to prior version)	2	Brake Adjustment (Note: New delay)	7	Wrecker	13	Go
1965 (99)	12	75 Miles (Note: Distance increased by 30 miles compared to prior version)	2	Burning oil	7	Wrecker	13	Go
1965 (99)			3	Stop to Refuel	7	Gasoline	13	Go
1965 (99)			3	Populated Area	6 (Note: Count increased by 1 card compared to prior version)	Freeway	13	Go

== In popular culture ==
- The members of They Might Be Giants can be seen playing Touring in the video for their song "Ana Ng".
