= Grass (surname) =

Grass is an English surname. A possible origin is being an anglicized surname of Scottish origin derived from the occupation of shoemaker (Scottish Gaelic word greusaich or griasaich).

- Alex Grass (1927–2009), American businessman and lawyer
- Arthur Grass (1897–1994), English-born Brazilian cricketer
- Frank J. Grass (born 1951), American general
- Günter Grass (1927–2015), German author and playwright
- John Grass (1837–1918), Native American Lakota leader
- Philippe Grass (1801–1876), French sculptor
- Vincent Grass (born 1949), Belgian actor
