= Laurent Gras =

Laurent Gras may refer to:

- Laurent Gras (chef) (born 1965), French chef
- Laurent Gras (ice hockey) (born 1976), French ice hockey player
