= Basile Gras =

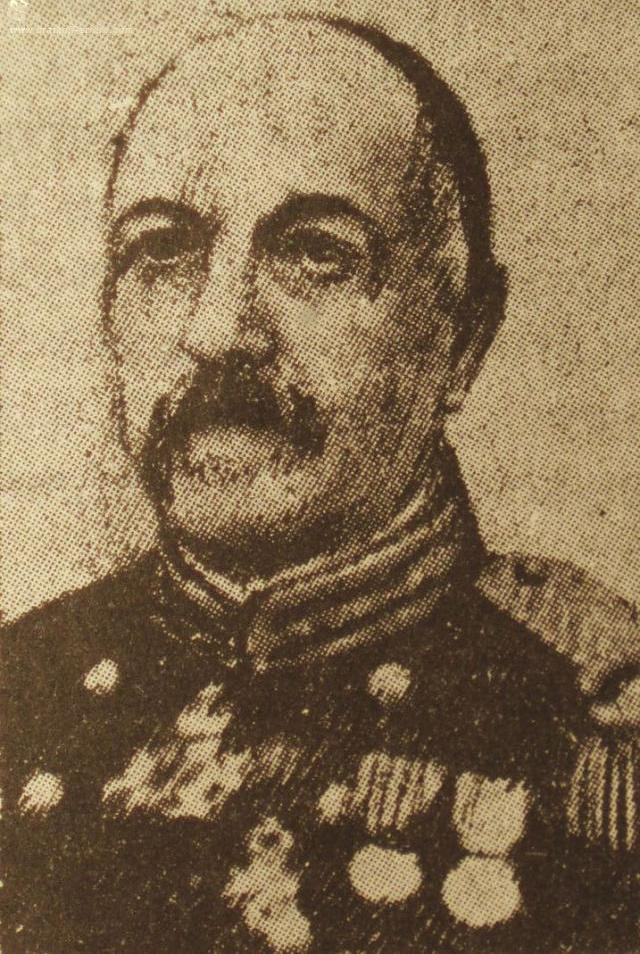
- Born: Basile Gras; 2 January 1836; St. Amand, France
- Died: 14 April 1901 (aged 65); Chablis, Yonne, France
- Occupations: soldier, inventor, Army general
- Employer: French Army

General Basile Gras (2 January 1836 – 14 April 1901) created the Gras rifle for the French Army in 1874 by converting the Mle 1866 Chassepot rifle to fire metallic cartridges. Gras, who was a colonel at the time, played a very important role in the formulation and industrial production of the Lebel rifle. He was an alumnus of Ecole Polytechnique, then a shooting instructor at l'École Normale de Tir at Châlons. Eventually he supervised the three weapon manufacturing facilities at St Etienne, Châtellerault and Tulle. Finally he became Secretary of War for France.
