= M1871 Beaumont =

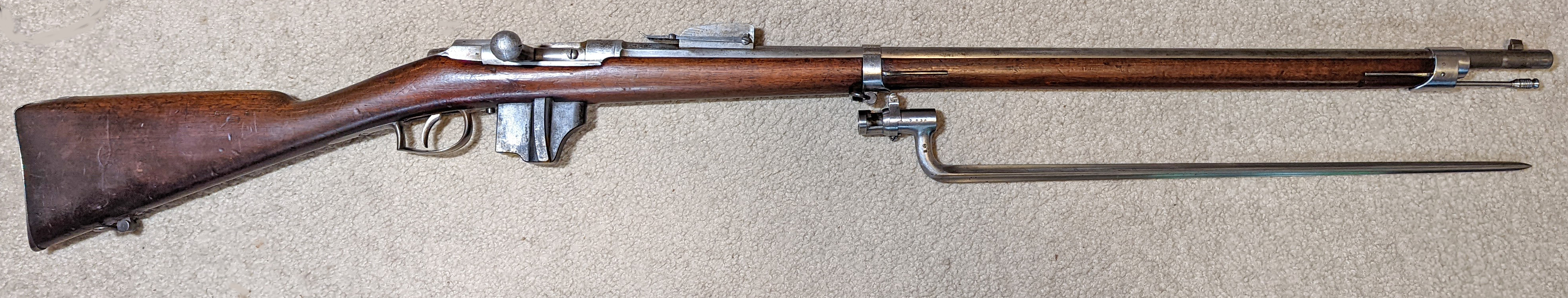
- Type: Service rifle, Bolt-action rifle
- Place of origin: Netherlands

Service history
- In service: 1871–1895
- Used by: Netherlands; Chile; Ethiopia; Kingdom of Bavaria

Production history
- Designer: Edouard de Beaumont
- Designed: 1869
- Manufacturer: Edouard de Beaumont; Simson, Göbel and Bornmüller; P. Stevens; Workshop for Portable Weapons; G. Mordent Company; Manufacture d'Armes
- Produced: 1869–1880
- No. built: 138,000

Specifications
- Mass: M1871 Rifle: 4.415 kg (9.73 lb); M1871/88: 4.55 kg (10.0 lb); Colonial Rifle: 4.415 kg (9.73 lb)
- Length: M1871, M1873, M1871/88 models: 1,320 mm (52 in); Cadet: 1,150 mm (45 in); Navy carbine: 1,100 mm (43 in); Cavalry carbine: 1,030 mm (41 in); Pupil: 1,020 mm (40 in)
- Cartridge: 11.3x50mmR or 11x52mmR
- Action: Bolt-action
- Rate of fire: 14.5 rounds per minute
- Muzzle velocity: 450 m/s (1,500 ft/s)
- Effective firing range: up to 600 m (660 yd)
- Maximum firing range: M1871 Rifle: 1,100 yd (1,000 m); M1871/88 Rifle: 1,968 yd (1,800 m)
- Feed system: M1871: Single shot M1871/88: 4-round clip

The 1871 Beaumont and its variants were the service rifle of the Armed forces of the Netherlands between 1871 and 1895, and by the Royal Netherlands East Indies Army into the 1900s.

It was one of the first military arms adopted by a European power using a metallic cartridge. The bolt of the rifle used a split bolt design similar to the French Chassepot, and used a unique leaf mainspring inside the two-piece bolt handle—which was later used by the Murata Type 13 and Type 18 rifles in Japan.

== History ==
Following the successful introduction of breechloading rifles in European armies in the 1860s, Dutch officials sought to modernize its service rifle. In 1867, the Dutch army converted its Muzzleloader rifles using the Snider–Enfield breechloading system until a new rifle could be chosen.

In 1870, after trials of rifles from companies including Peabody, Remington, Cooper, Comblain, Jenks and Benson-Poppenburg, the Dutch army selected the Beaumont rifle designed by Edouard de Beaumont.

The rifle was not adopted for cavalry use due to the bolt making it difficult to carry while slung across the back. Instead, cavalry troops received the Remington Rolling block rifle.

Several armies expressed interest in the design. There were 150 rifles tested by the French military between 1872 and 1874, and others tested in Germany, but the Beaumont was not adopted by either service. The Royal Danish Army also tested the rifle in 1887.

During the First World War, an unknown number of Beaumont rifles were used by German (at least Bavarian) second-line troops. Including Beaumont-Vitali rifles that were shortened and burnished. It is likely that the weapons were seized from arms dealers in Liège.

== Variants ==
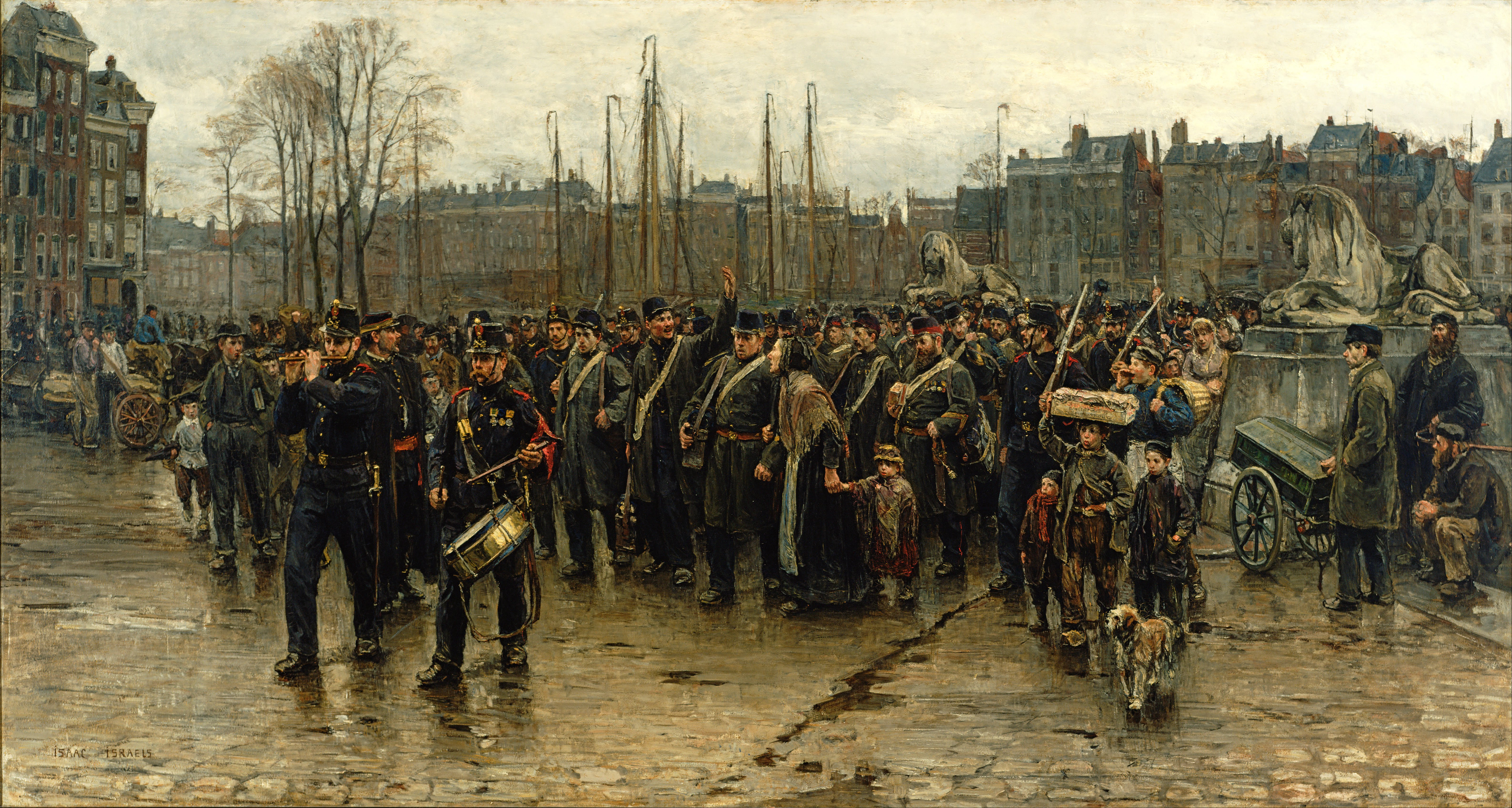
Soldiers bound for the Dutch East Indies carry M1871 Beaumont rifles.

The M1873 Colonial Rifle was developed for deployment to the Dutch East Indies. The rifles replaced earlier percussion rifles and centerfire rifles created by Lt. FWH Kuhn. Earlier shipments of the rifle were sent back to Europe due to the rear sights not having distance markings. In total, 35,000 rifles were produced for deployment to the colony.

The metal of the barrel, breech, sights and bayonet was browned in order to prevent corrosion in the tropical humidity. The colonial rifles were not updated to later standards like those remaining in Europe, such as using newer cartridges, upgraded sights or a magazine.

A cavalry version was used between 1898 and 1914 by units including the Mangkoe-Nagoro Legion. Between 1899 and 1910, many rifles were shortened for use by the Corps Armed Police.

The Pupil Rifle 1878 and Cadet Rifle 1878 were introduced for training youths. The Cadet Rifle had a length of 1.15 meters, came with a 42.7 centimeter bayonet, and made for youths age 15 to 19 at the Breda military academy. The pupil rifle was shorter and meant for youth at the Nieuwesluis school for youths age 12 to 14 years. Both rifles were mainly intended for drills and had blank sights with no distance markings.

The M1871/79 Rifle saw several modifications. In 1879, a new cartridge was introduced with better ballistic performance. The new cartridge was comparable to that used in the Fusil Gras mle 1874 and Mauser Model 1871 rifles.

Other changes which had been implemented over the years and formalized in 1879 included modifying the extractor, removing the safety and changing the rear sights for one with a longer range and measurements in meters.

The Kamerschietoefeningen (KSO) rifles (translation: 'Rifle for indoor exercises') were introduced in 1891 and were converted from standard rifles to allow the firing of the 5.5mm Bosquette rimfire cartridge for training on short, indoor ranges.

Fencing models were believed to have been introduced in the 1890s.

The M1871/88 Beaumont-Vitali rifle was introduced in 1888 following developments in firearms design. In the 1880s, the adoption of repeating rifles and the invention of smokeless gunpowder made the Beaumont M1871 obsolete. Tests involving magazine systems from Krnka, Kropatchek, Lee, Mannlicher, Vitali and Werndl were conducted between 1879 and 1888. On 23 February 1886, the Dutch Minister of War appointed a "commission for the purpose of evaluating the rifle question", which was tasked with gathering information on the new system of repeating rifles. As the matter of finding a new rifle was regarded a long-term goal, the immediate adoption of a magazine rifle was also considered. The Dutch military approved the M1871/88 in 1889, adding a 4-round Vitali magazine to around 60,000 existing rifles. Other modifications included updated sights and ejector, and vent holes in the event of case rupture.

Due to its use of a clip-fed magazine, the rifle has a firing rate of up to 14.5 rounds per minute. The brass cartridge fires a 385-grain hardened lead round nose projectile with 77 grains of black powder at a velocity of 1,444 feet per second at the muzzle. The rifle is sighted up to 1,968 yards.

A stopgap measure, the upgraded rifles were made obsolete as the main service rifle in 1895 by the Steyr Geweer M. 95 using a smokeless cartridge. Beaumont rifles were then sent to militia units and remained in service until 1907. The rifles, many of which were shortened, were sent to the Dutch East Indies and remained in use until World War II. Others were converted to smoothbore shotguns for civilian use. The KSO rifles and fencing rifles remained in use until May 1940.

== Gallery ==
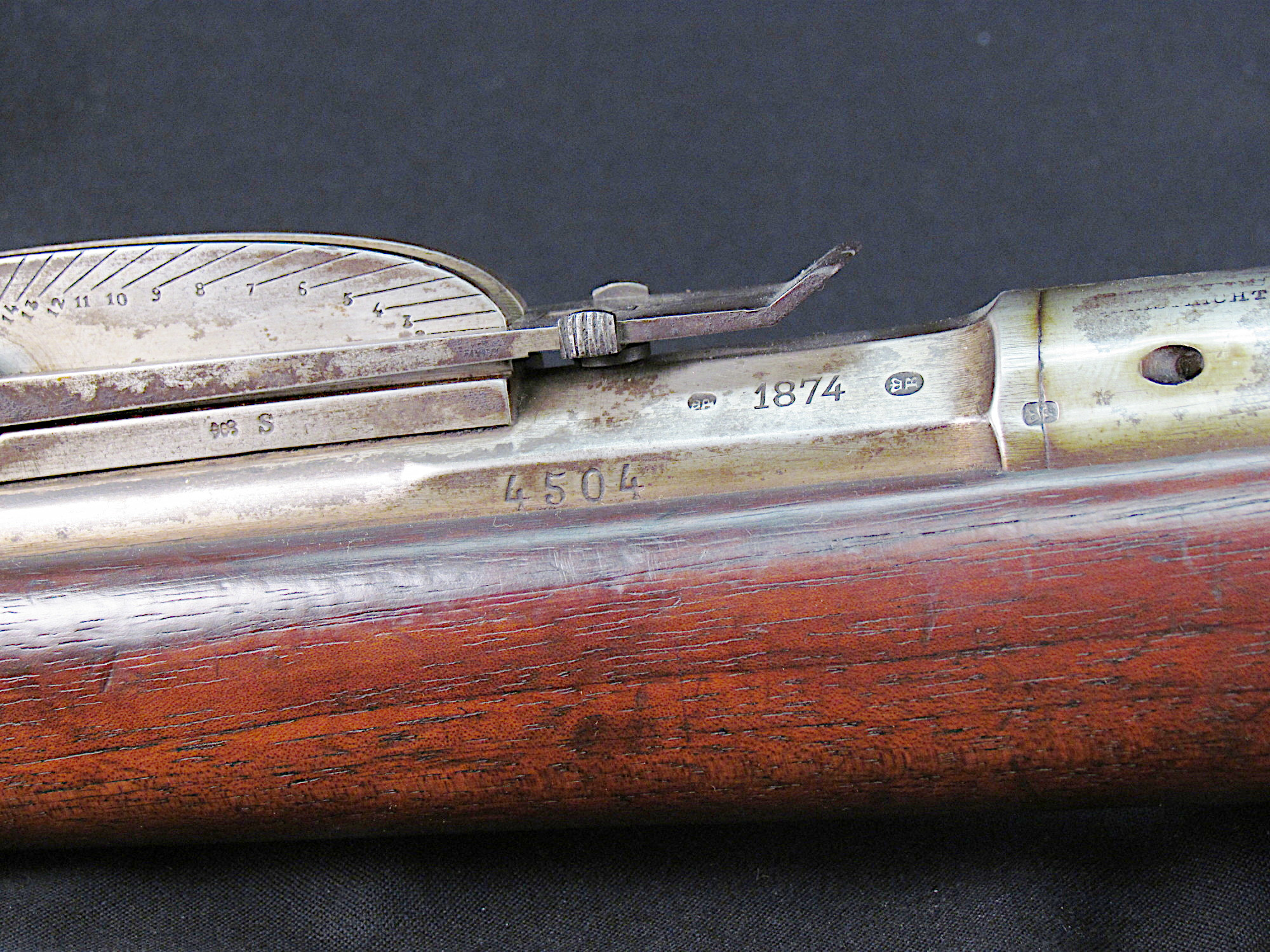

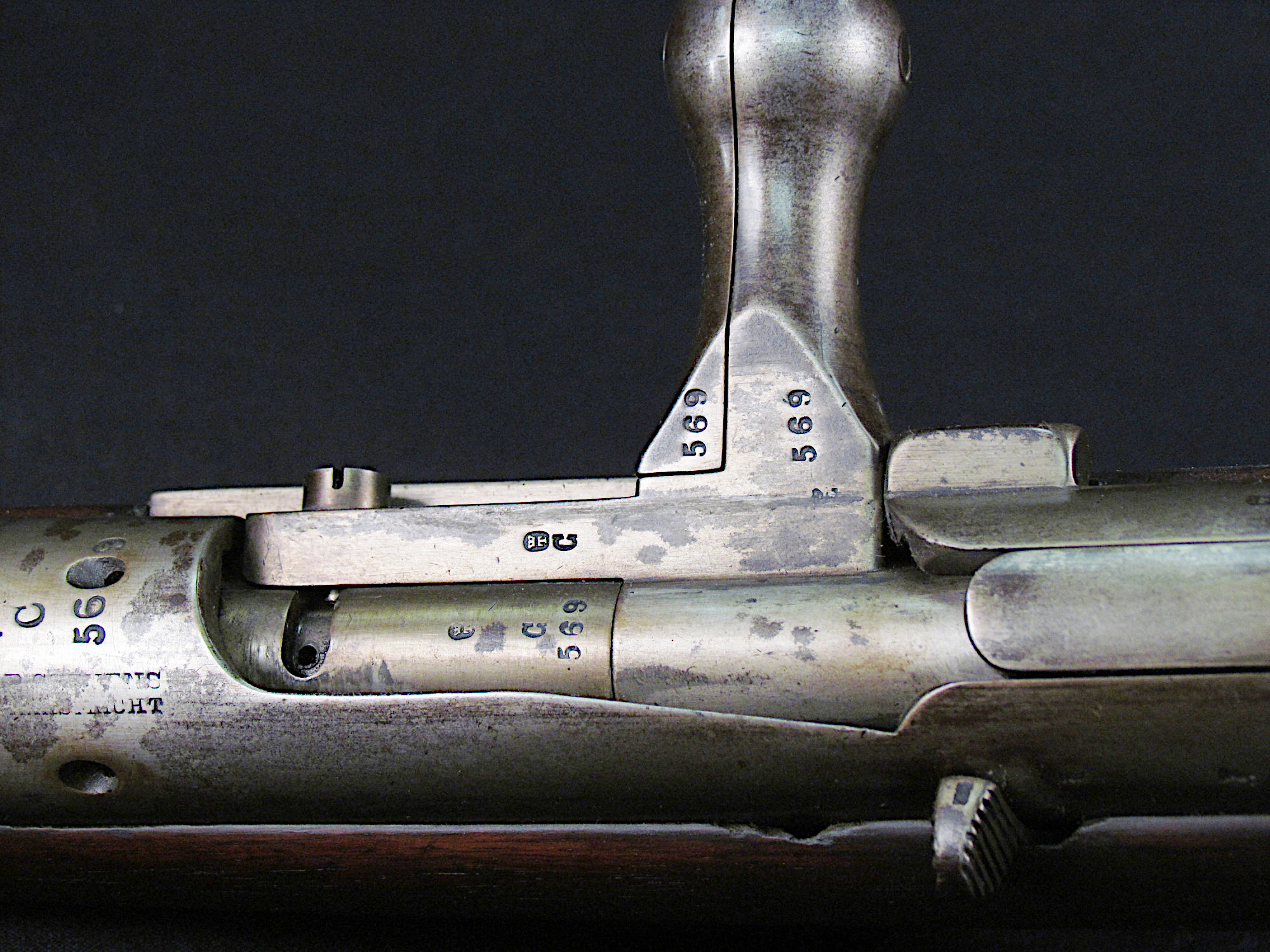

== Conflicts ==
- War of the Pacific
- World War I

== See also ==
- Table of handgun and rifle cartridges
