= Fusil Gras mle 1874 =

French bolt-action rifle

Fusil Modèle 1874 or Fusil Gras
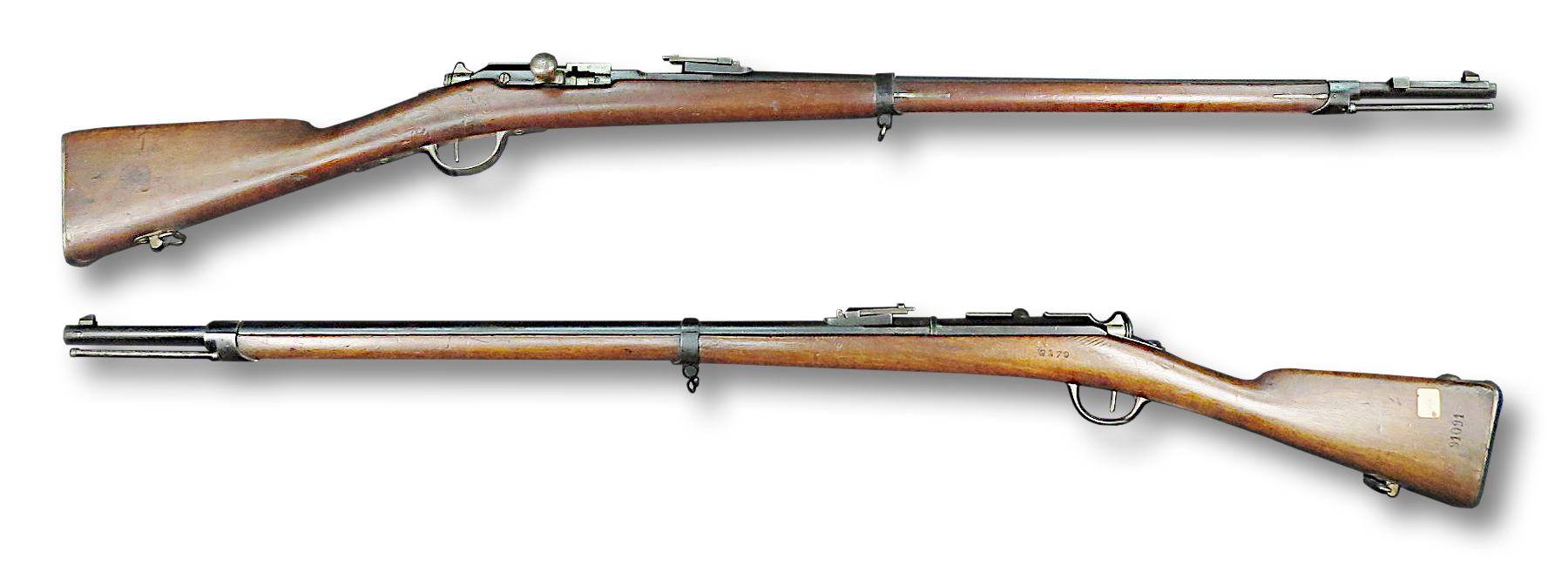
- Fusil Gras M80 1874
- Type: Bolt-action rifle
- Place of origin: France

Service history
- In service: 1874–1941; 1874–1886 (primary French service rifle)
- Used by: France; Other users
- Wars: See conflicts

Production history
- Designed: 1871
- Manufacturer: Manufacture d'armes de Saint-Étienne and Steyr
- No. built: 2,500,000
- Variants: M80; M14

Specifications
- Mass: 4.2 kg (9.3 lb); 3.6 kg (7.9 lb) (cavalry); 3.2 kg (7.1 lb) (Artillery)
- Length: 1,310 mm (52 in); 1,175 mm (46.3 in) (cavalry); 995 mm (39.2 in) (Artillery)
- Barrel length: 795 mm (31.3 in); 680 mm (27 in) (cavalry); 490 mm (19 in) (Artillery)
- Cartridge: 11×59mmR Gras; 8×50mmR Lebel
- Action: Bolt action
- Muzzle velocity: 454 m/s (1,490 ft/s); 350 m/s (1,100 ft/s) (Cavalry)
- Feed system: Single-shot
- Sights: Iron sights

The Fusil Modèle 1874 or Gras was the French Army's primary service rifle from 1874 to 1886. Designed by Colonel Basile Gras, the Gras was a metallic cartridge adaptation of the single-shot, breech-loading, black powder Chassepot rifle. It was developed from 1872 to 1874 as a response to the German adoption of the Mauser Model 1871 metallic cartridge rifle.

Modified in 1880 as the M80 with an improved breechblock and in 1914 as the M14 to accommodate the 8×50mmR Lebel smokeless powder cartridge, the Gras was replaced as the standard-issue service rifle by the Lebel in 1886.

== Description ==
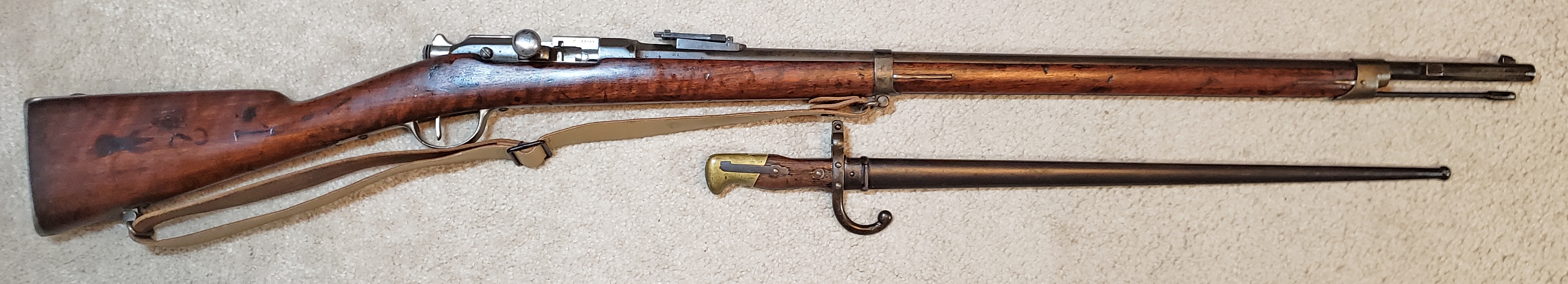
Mle. 1874 Gras Rifle Mfg in 1877 at St. Etienne Arsenal

Converted from the Chassepot, the Gras was in 11 mm (0.43 in) caliber and used black powder centerfire metallic cartridges with a 385 gr (24.9 g; 0.88 oz) bullet over a 78 gr (5.1 g; 0.18 oz) charge. It was a robust and hard-hitting single-shot weapon. Additionally it had a triangular-shaped Model 1874 "Gras" sword bayonet. The Gras rifle was replaced from 1886 by the Lebel rifle.

== Development ==
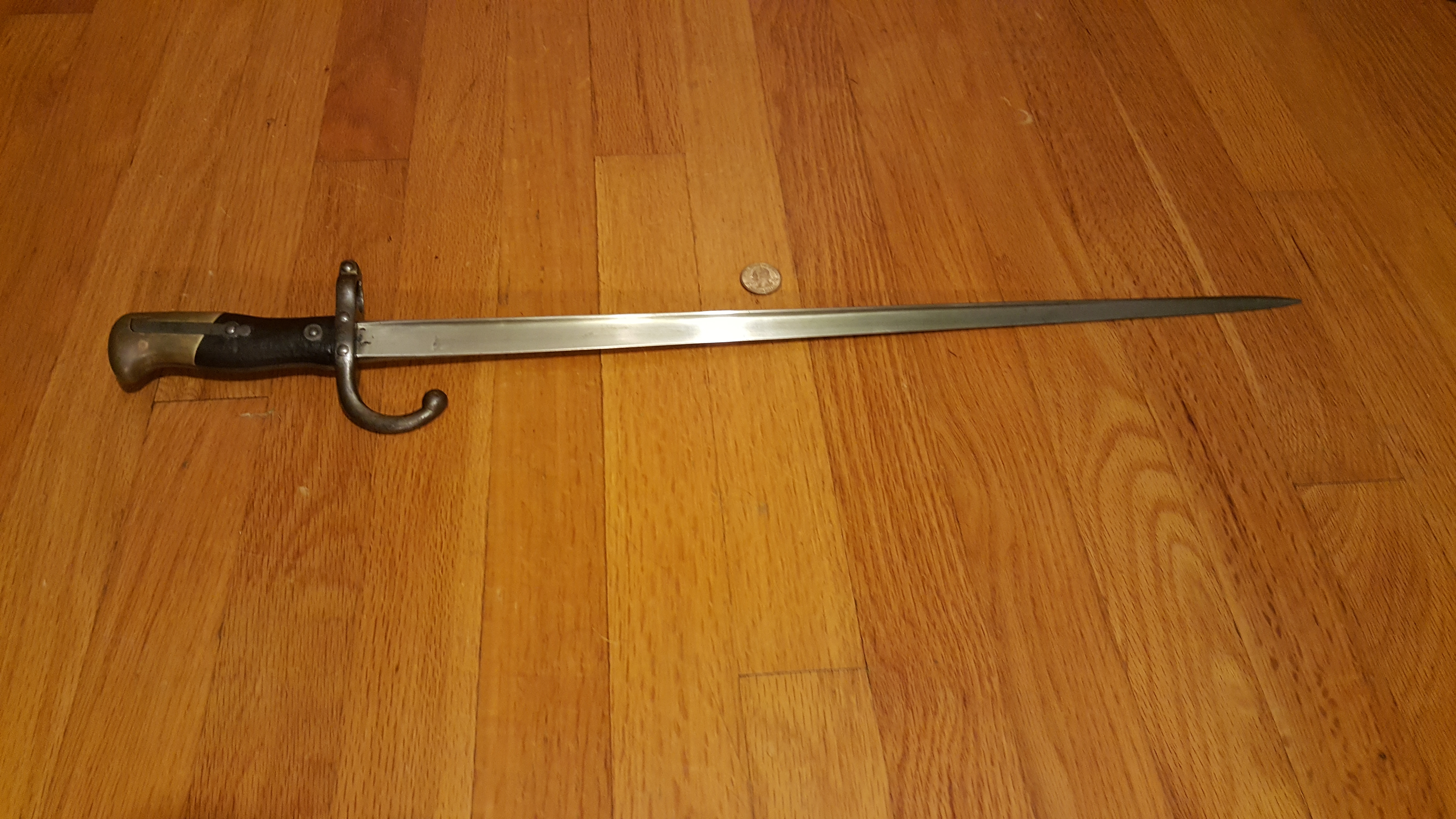
The Model 1874 sword bayonet.

The Gras was manufactured in response to the development of the Boxer cartridge in 1866, and the British 1870 Martini–Henry rifle which used it. Those were soon emulated by the Germans with the 1871 Mauser. The French Army set up a study group in September 1871 that chose the metallic over the paper cartridge. A second study group in 1873 looked at various metallic cartridge adaptations. Colonel Gras proposed a modification of the Chassepot to accept metal cartridges and on 7 July 1874, the French Army chose his design over the M1871 Beaumont rifle.

== History ==
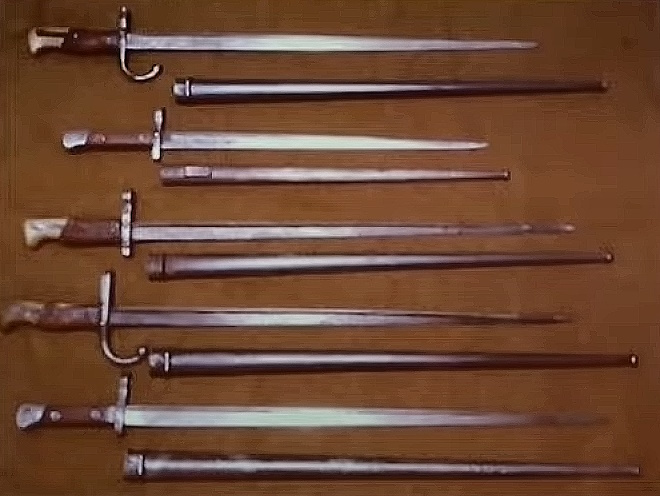
samples of the Greek M1939 bayonet

The Hellenic Army adopted the Gras in 1877, and it was used in all conflicts until the Second World War. It became the favourite weapon of Greek guerrilla fighters, from the various revolts against the Ottoman Empire to the resistance against the Axis, acquiring legendary status. The name entered the Greek language, and grades (γκράδες) was a term colloquially applied to all rifles during the first half of the 20th century. It was manufactured by Manufacture d'armes de Saint-Étienne, one of several government-owned arms factories in France. However most of the Gras rifles (60,000) used by the Hellenic military were manufactured under licence by Steyr in Austria.

The Gras rifle was partly the inspiration for the development of the Japanese Murata rifle, Japan's first locally made service rifle. It was also among the rifles copied in the arms industry of the Wassoulou Empire in the 1880s and 90s.

According to Vietnamese historian Phạm Văn Sơn, Cao Thắng, a leader of the Cần Vương movement, managed to copy the design of a "French 1874-type rapid-firing rifle", yet this variation has a limited range and the absence of a rifled barrel.

In 1915, 450,000 Gras rifles were sent to the Russian Empire.

After 1918, Mle 1874 rifles were exported to Yugoslavia, Poland and Greece. During the Rif War, the Rifian rebels used Gras rifles stolen or traded from Algeria since the 1890s against colonial Spanish forces.

== Modifications during World War I ==
=== Modified rifle ===
In 1914, the French Army modified 146,000 rifles to fire 8 mm Lebel by using the barrel of a Lebel or Berthier rifle. They were used by second-line troops. In 1940, after the French defeat, although receiving the designation Gewehr 361(f), most of these rifles were destroyed by the German occupiers.

=== Grenade launcher ===
Gras rifles and the 11x59mmR cartridges were also widely used by front line troops as converted grenade launchers, known as Bombardes DR (grenade throwers) these conversions had cut down barrels and butts of varying workmanship and fired blank cartridges to propel the grenade, and were used as a crude form of trench mortar.

=== Greek modified bayonets ===
The period 1932-1939 Greece manufactured the M1939 bayonet, it was a modification of the Gras Model 1874 bayonet and was used by Greek soldiers in World War II.

== Users ==
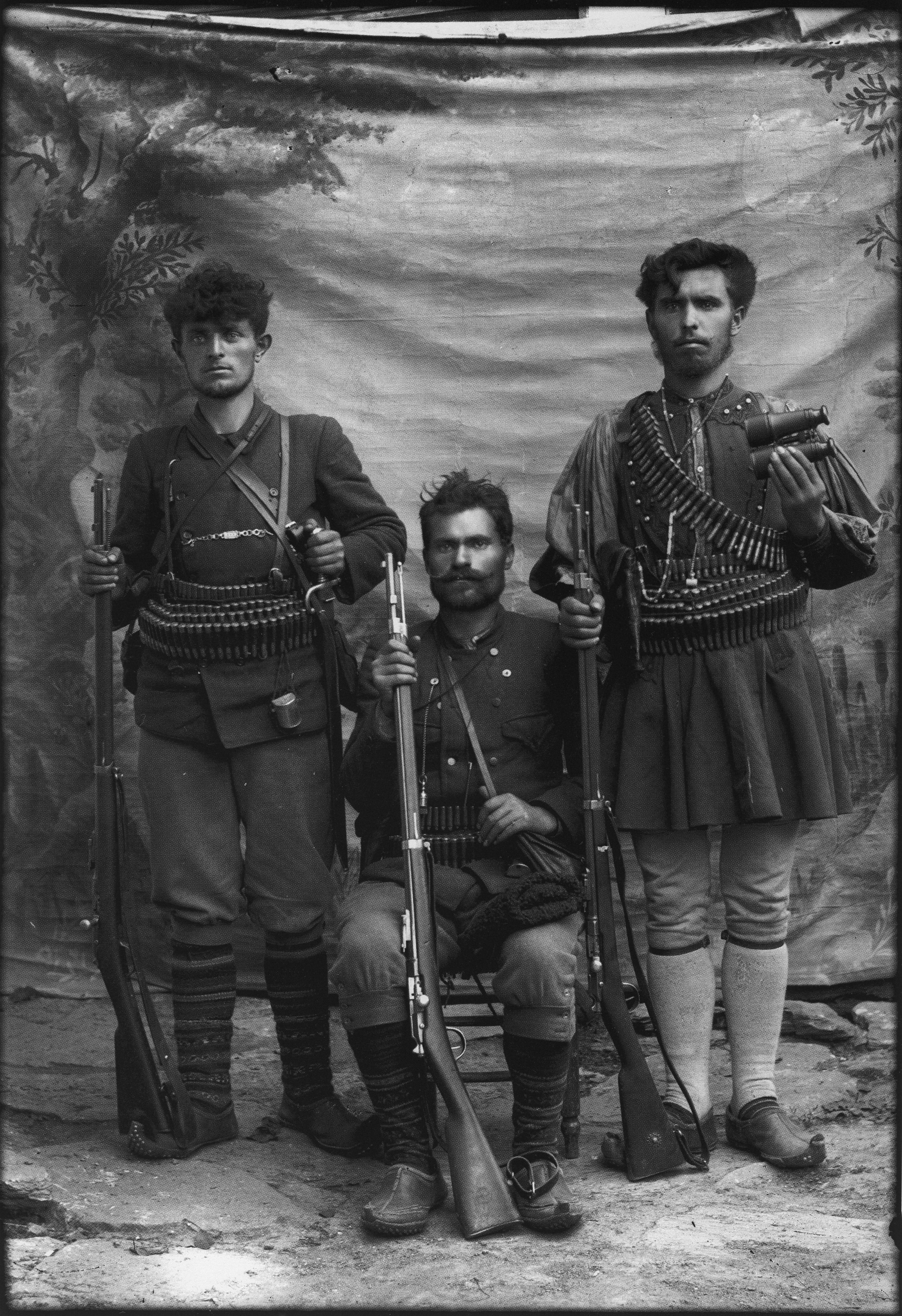
Internal Macedonian Revolutionary Organization anti-Ottoman guerrilla with Gras rifles, circa 1903.

- Argentina
- Canada: In use by the Quebec Home Guard and Papal Zouaves in both 11mm and 8mm Lebel.
- Belgian Congo: 15,000 rifles bought by the Force Publique during World War I, still in service with second-line units during World War II.
- Chile: During the War of the Pacific.
- China
- Colombia: Several thousand were bought at the end of the 19th century. They were used during the Thousand Days' War, against the Panamanian rebels and various civil Colombian conflicts from the 1920s to the 1950s.
- Ethiopian Empire: the Gras was used by the Ethiopian Army during both Italian invasions, being popular among irregular soldiers. Most were acquired from French.
- French Third Republic
- Greece: the Gras was used by the Hellenic Army as late as 1941 in the Battle of Crete.
- Haiti: Haitian army used Gras rifles until its disbandment by occupying American forces. The army's successor force, the Gendarmerie of Haiti, used old Gras rifles until replaced in 1916 by Springfield Model 1892–99 rifles.
- Irish Republic: Used by Irish rebels in 1916.
- Korea
- Monaco
- Montenegro: Bought from Greece at the end of the 19th century.
- Paraguay: 1300 were smuggled in by liberal rebels during the 1904 Revolution, and later used by the Army.
- Poland
- Republic of the Rif
- Russian Empire: Due to firearm shortages in World War I, the Russian Empire received 450,000 Gras rifles from France in 1915.
- Kingdom of Serbia: passed on to Yugoslavia following purchase during World War I.
- Siam: Some were purchased in the 19th century, during World War I, the Siamese Expeditionary Forces were equipped by the French with Gras rifles chambered in 8mm Lebel.
- Spanish Republic: Smuggled in for use with Republican forces during the civil war.
- Turkish National Movement: Captured rifles from Greek forces.
- Vietnam: Vietnamese insurgents of the Hương Khê uprising managed to create copies of the Fusil Gras mle 1874. However, they did not have rifled barrels.
- Yemen: Still used in Yemen in 2002.
- Yugoslavia
- Wadai Empire
- Wassoulou Empire: fighting the Mandingo Wars against France

== Conflicts ==
- French colonial expeditions
- Sino-French War
- War of the Pacific
- Argentine Civil Wars
- Chilean Civil War of 1891
- First Italo-Ethiopian War
- Thousand Days' War
- Greco-Turkish War (1897)
- Macedonian Struggle
- Second Boer War
- 1904 Paraguayan Revolution
- Balkan Wars
- World War I
- Irish revolutionary period
- Greco-Turkish War (1919–22)
- Rif War
- Second Italo-Ethiopian War
- Spanish Civil War
- World War II

== Comparison with contemporary rifles ==
Comparison of 1880s rifles
Calibre	System	Country	Velocity					Height of trajectory				Ammunition	
Calibre	System	Country	Muzzle	500 yd (460 m)	1,000 yd (910 m)	1,500 yd (1,400 m)	2,000 yd (1,800 m)	500 yd (460 m)	1,000 yd (910 m)	1,500 yd (1,400 m)	2,000 yd (1,800 m)	Propellant	Bullet
.433 in (11.0 mm)	Werndl–Holub rifle	Austria-Hungary	1,439 ft/s (439 m/s)	854 ft/s (260 m/s)	620 ft/s (190 m/s)	449 ft/s (137 m/s)	328 ft/s (100 m/s)	8.252 ft (2.515 m)	49.41 ft (15.06 m)	162.6 ft (49.6 m)	426.0 ft (129.8 m)	77 gr (5.0 g)	370 gr (24 g)
.45 in (11.43 mm)	Martini–Henry	United Kingdom	1,315 ft/s (401 m/s)	869 ft/s (265 m/s)	664 ft/s (202 m/s)	508 ft/s (155 m/s)	389 ft/s (119 m/s)	9.594 ft (2.924 m)	47.90 ft (14.60 m)	147.1 ft (44.8 m)	357.85 ft (109.07 m)	85 gr (5.5 g)	480 gr (31 g)
.433 in (11.0 mm)	Fusil Gras mle 1874	France	1,489 ft/s (454 m/s)	878 ft/s (268 m/s)	643 ft/s (196 m/s)	471 ft/s (144 m/s)	348 ft/s (106 m/s)	7.769 ft (2.368 m)	46.6 ft (14.2 m)	151.8 ft (46.3 m)	389.9 ft (118.8 m)	80 gr (5.2 g)	386 gr (25.0 g)
.433 in (11.0 mm)	Mauser Model 1871	Germany	1,430 ft/s (440 m/s)	859 ft/s (262 m/s)	629 ft/s (192 m/s)	459 ft/s (140 m/s)	388 ft/s (118 m/s)	8.249 ft (2.514 m)	48.68 ft (14.84 m)	159.2 ft (48.5 m)	411.1 ft (125.3 m)	75 gr (4.9 g)	380 gr (25 g)
.408 in (10.4 mm)	M1870 Italian Vetterli	Italy	1,430 ft/s (440 m/s)	835 ft/s (255 m/s)	595 ft/s (181 m/s)	422 ft/s (129 m/s)	304 ft/s (93 m/s)	8.527 ft (2.599 m)	52.17 ft (15.90 m)	176.3 ft (53.7 m)	469.9 ft (143.2 m)	62 gr (4.0 g)	310 gr (20 g)
.397 in (10.08 mm)	Jarmann M1884	Norway and Sweden	1,536 ft/s (468 m/s)	908 ft/s (277 m/s)	675 ft/s (206 m/s)	504 ft/s (154 m/s)	377 ft/s (115 m/s)	7.235 ft (2.205 m)	42.97 ft (13.10 m)	137.6 ft (41.9 m)	348.5 ft (106.2 m)	77 gr (5.0 g)	337 gr (21.8 g)
.42 in (10.67 mm)	Berdan rifle	Russia	1,444 ft/s (440 m/s)	873 ft/s (266 m/s)	645 ft/s (197 m/s)	476 ft/s (145 m/s)	353 ft/s (108 m/s)	7.995 ft (2.437 m)	47.01 ft (14.33 m)	151.7 ft (46.2 m)	388.7 ft (118.5 m)	77 gr (5.0 g)	370 gr (24 g)
.45 in (11.43 mm)	Springfield model 1884	United States	1,301 ft/s (397 m/s)	875 ft/s (267 m/s)	676 ft/s (206 m/s)	523 ft/s (159 m/s)	404 ft/s (123 m/s)	8.574 ft (2.613 m)	46.88 ft (14.29 m)	142.3 ft (43.4 m)	343.0 ft (104.5 m)	70 gr (4.5 g)	500 gr (32 g)
.40 in (10.16 mm)	Enfield-Martini	United Kingdom	1,570 ft/s (480 m/s)	947 ft/s (289 m/s)	719 ft/s (219 m/s)	553 ft/s (169 m/s)	424 ft/s (129 m/s)	6.704 ft (2.043 m)	39.00 ft (11.89 m)	122.0 ft (37.2 m)	298.47 ft (90.97 m)	85 gr (5.5 g)	384 gr (24.9 g)

== Gallery ==
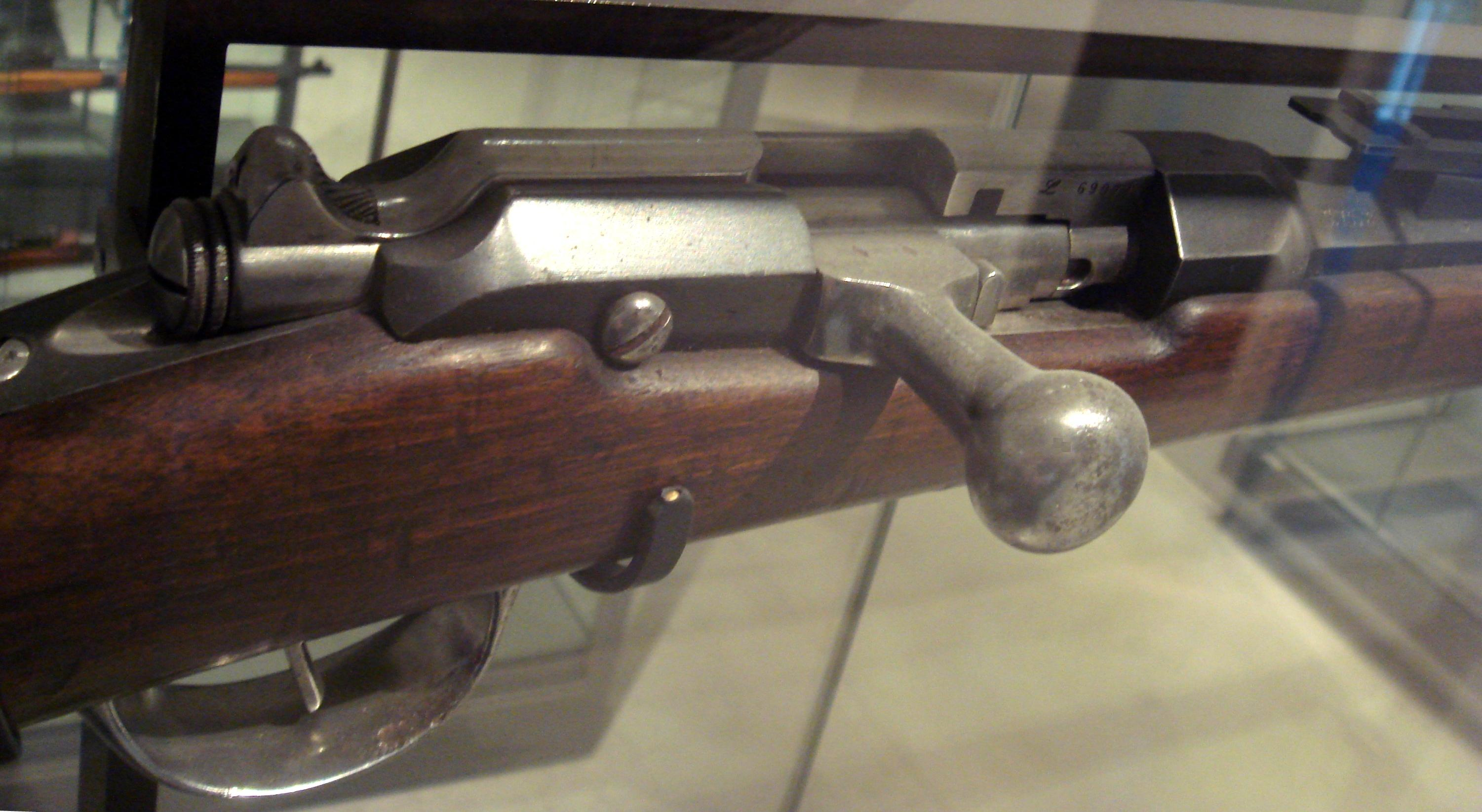
Fusil Gras M80 1874 breech portion

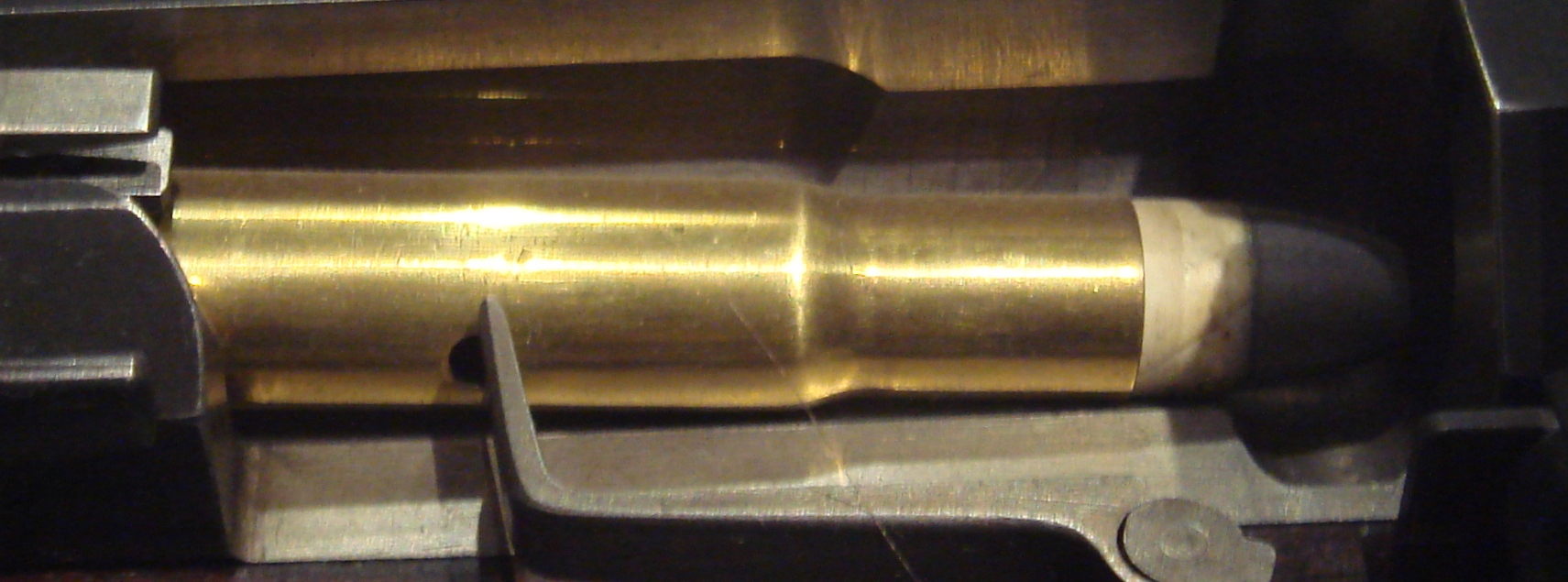
Fusil Gras M80 Mle 1874 metallic cartridge

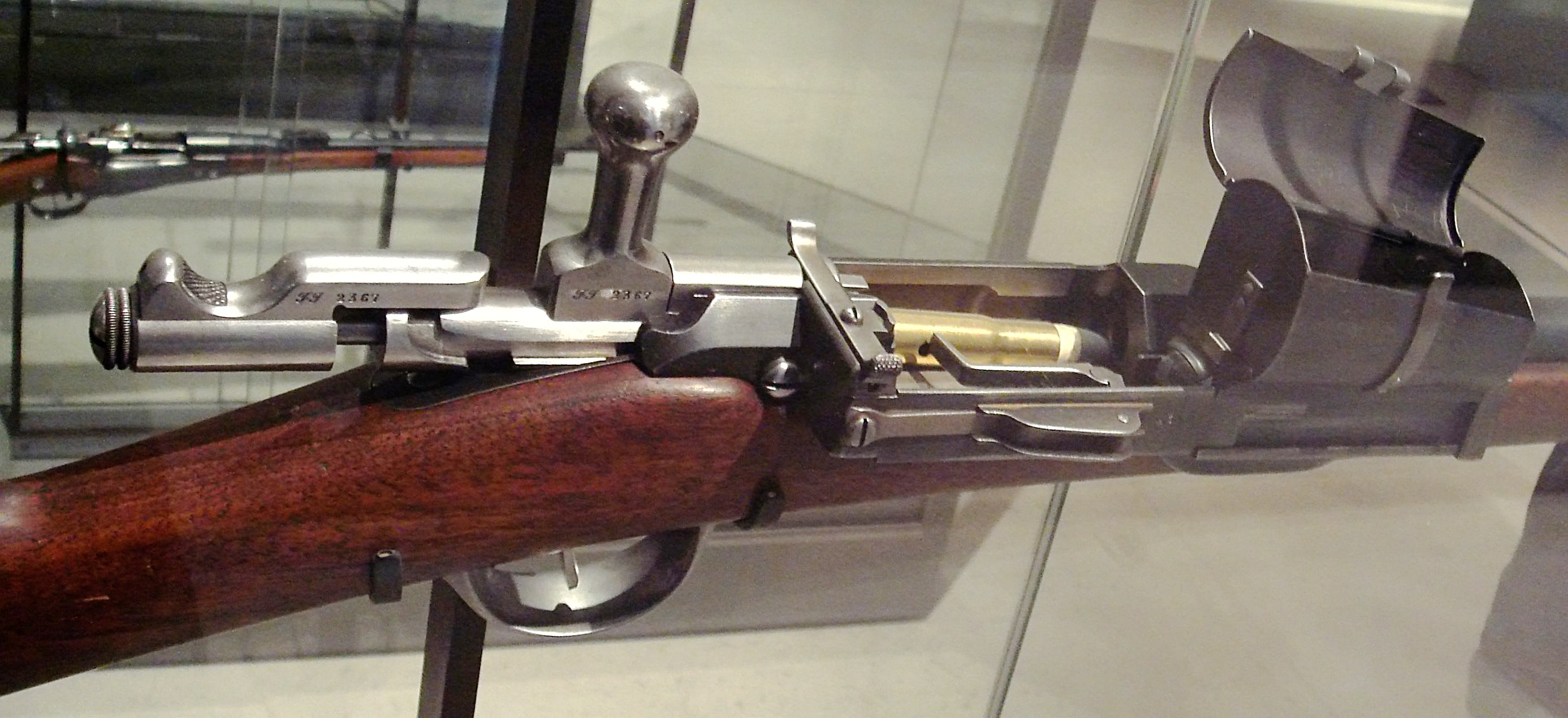
Fusil Gras modified in 1883 with 10-cartridge gravity hopper

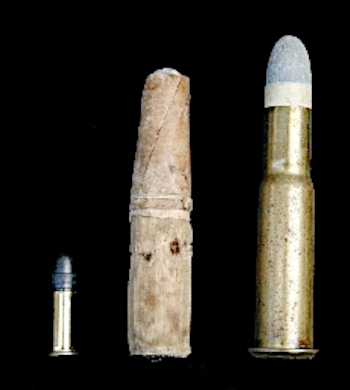
R: 11×59.5 mm R metallic cartridge for Fusil Gras mle 1874

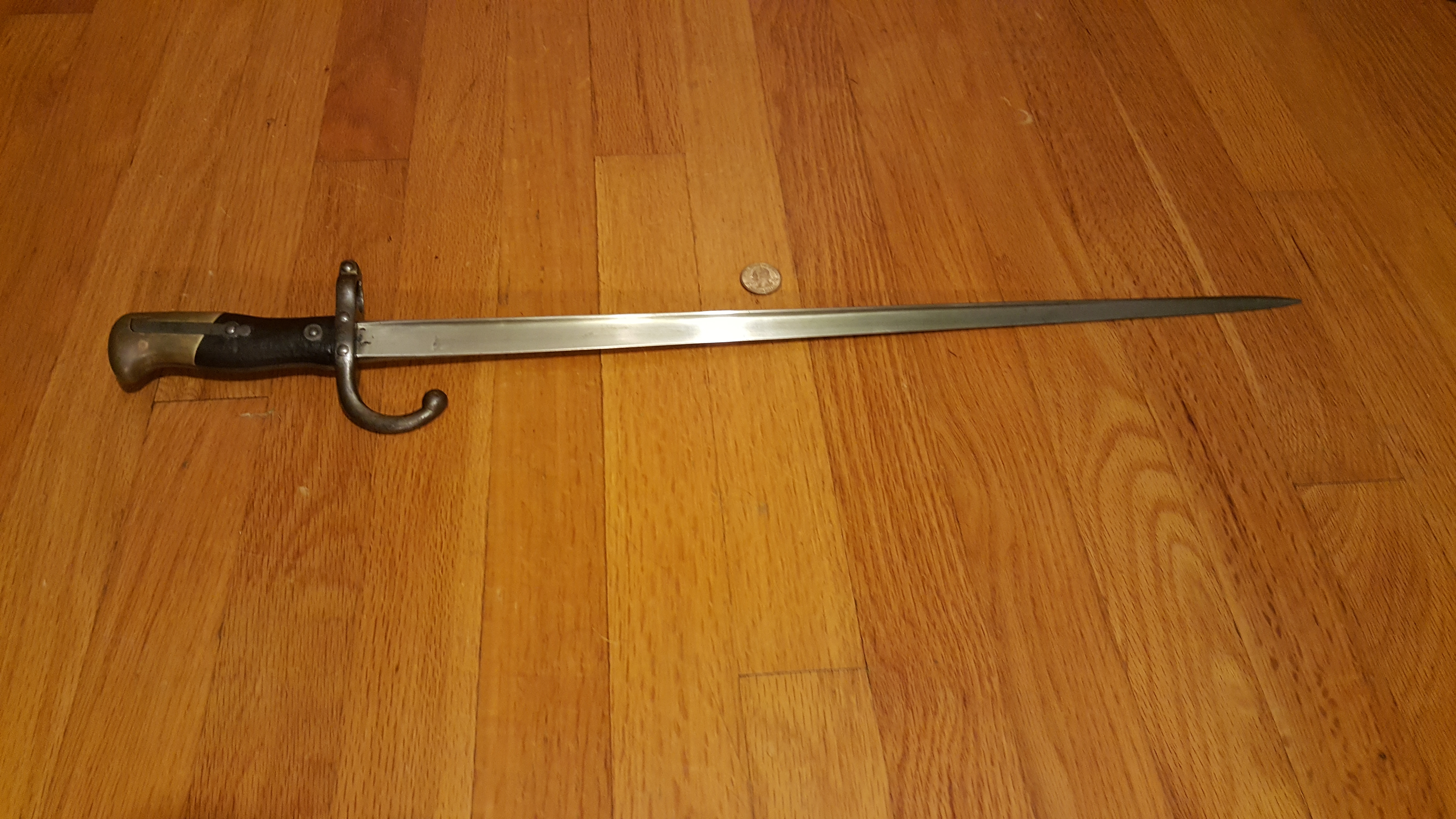
1875 Gras bayonet

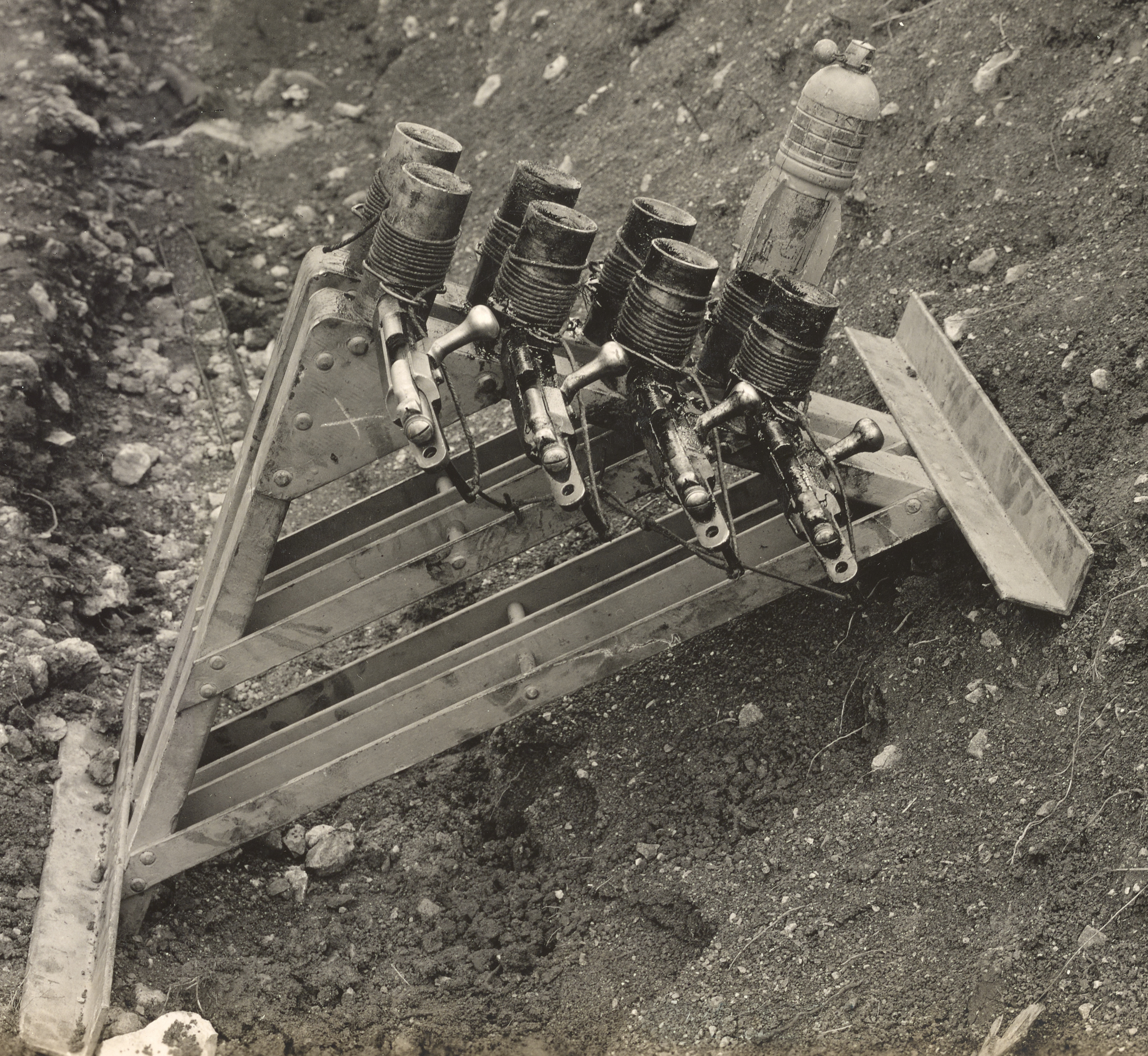
A French grenade thrower using Gras rifle actions with cut down barrels. Bombardes DR grenades were propelled by firing cartridges with the bullets removed.

== See also ==
- Berthier rifle
- Lebel Model 1886 rifle
- Table of handgun and rifle cartridges

== Sources ==
- Jowett, Philip (2024). The Rif War 1921–26: Morocco's Berber Uprising (eBook ed.). Oxford, UK: Osprey Publishing. ISBN 978-1-4728-6248-8.
- Wright, John (1989). Libya, Chad and the Central Sahara. London: C. Hurst & Co. ISBN 1-85065-050-0.

Preceded by Chassepot Modèle 1866	French Army rifle 1874–1886	Succeeded by Lebel Modèle 1886
