= Arisaka =

Family of Japanese service rifles

Arisaka rifle
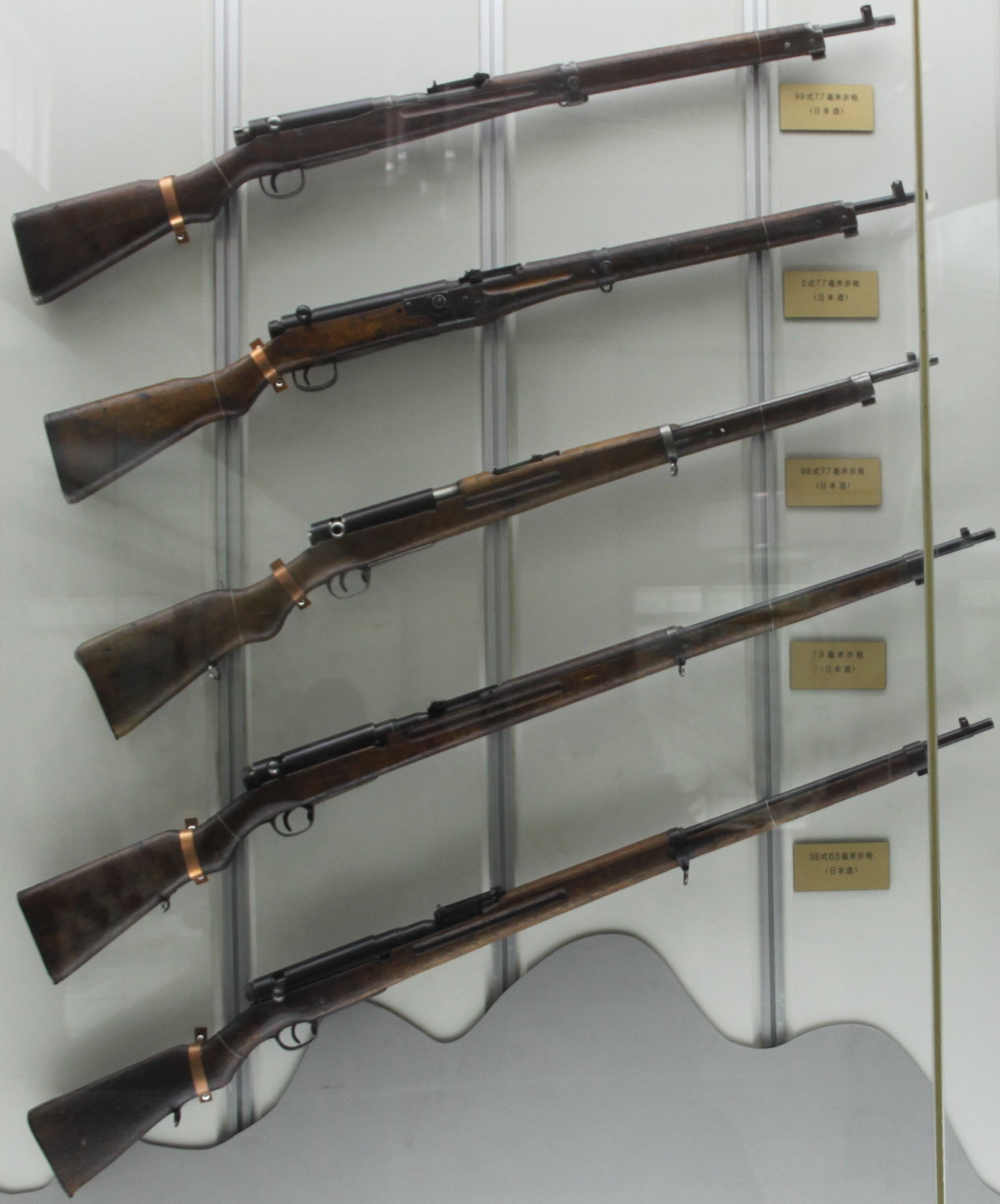
- Various Arisaka rifles on display at the Military Museum of the Chinese People's Revolution
- Type: Bolt-action service rifle
- Place of origin: Empire of Japan

Service history
- In service: 1897–1961
- Wars: Boxer Rebellion; Russo-Japanese War; Mexican Revolution; Mexican Border War; World War I Russian Civil War; Estonian War of Independence; Second Sino-Japanese War; Soviet–Japanese border conflicts Spanish Civil War; World War II; Chinese Civil War; Indonesian National Revolution; First Indochina War; Hukbalahap rebellion Korean War; Malayan Emergency; Vietnam War; Laotian Civil War; Cambodian Civil War; 1999 East Timorese crisis

Production history
- Designer: Arisaka Nariakira; Kijirō Nambu
- Designed: 1897
- Variants: Type 30; Type 30 carbine Type 35; Type 38; Type 38 carbine Type 38 sniper rifle Type 44 carbine Type 97 sniper rifle Type 99; Type 99 sniper rifle TERA

Specifications
- Cartridge: 6.5×50mmSR Type 30; 6.5×50mmSR Type 38; 7.7×58mm Type 92; 7.7×58mm Type 97; 7.7×58mm Type 99
- Action: Bolt-action
- Feed system: 5-round internal magazine (reloaded via stripper clip)
- Sights: Rear: ladder, tangent (Type 35); Front: fixed blade Sniper variants: factory-zeroed scope

The Arisaka rifle (Japanese: 有坂銃, romanized: Arisaka-jū, /ɑːriːsɑːkɑː/ AH-ree-SAH-kah) is a family of Japanese military bolt-action service rifles, which were produced and used from approximately 1897, when it replaced the Murata rifle (村田銃, Murata-jū) family, until the end of World War II in 1945. The most common models include the Type 38 chambered for the 6.5×50mmSR Type 38 cartridge, and the Type 99 chambered for the 7.7×58mm Type 99 cartridge, which is comparable in power to a modern .308 Winchester round.

== History ==
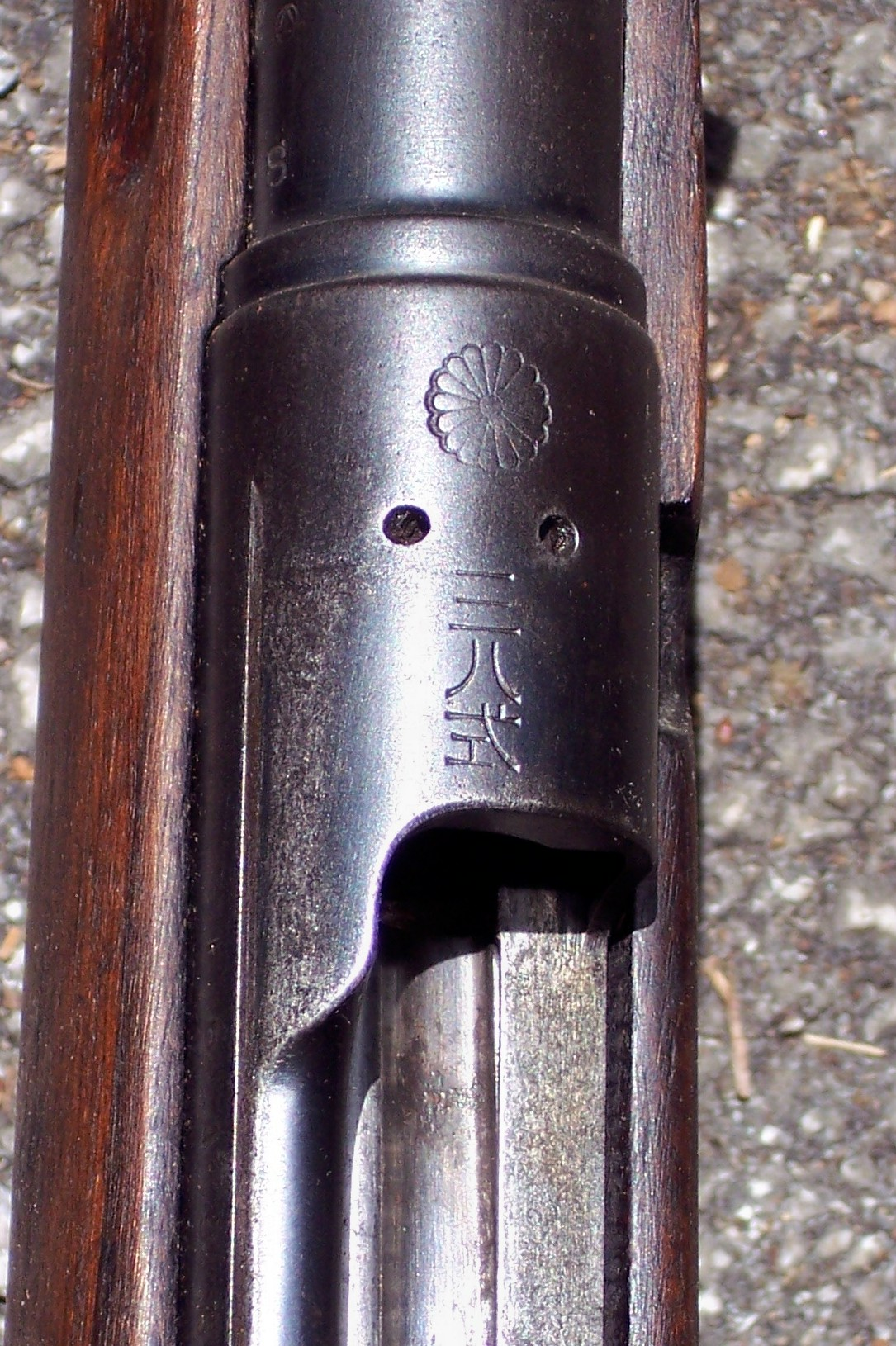
A Type 38 with its imperial seal intact

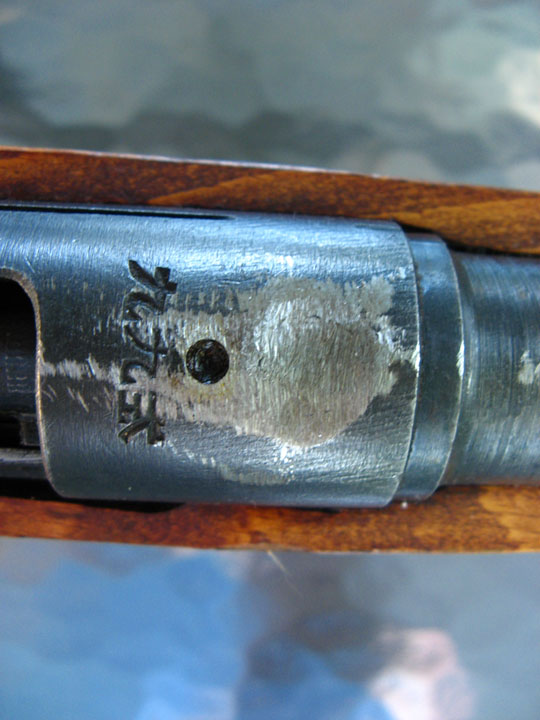
A Type 99 with its imperial seal ground

The design of the Arisaka rifle developed under the supervision of Colonel Arisaka Nariakira (有坂 成章; 1852–1915), who was promoted to lieutenant general in 1906 and in 1907 received the title of baron from Emperor Meiji. The design resembled, and may have been influenced by, the German Rifle Test Commission 8mm Model 1888 bolt-action rifle, which was based on the earlier Mauser design. Over the course of several wars, the rifle went through multiple production-runs, during which several variants were developed, including the transition from the 6.5mm Type 38 cartridge to the larger 7.7mm Type 99, as well as the introduction of a paratrooper rifle that could be broken down into two major parts for easier storage during airborne operations. Post-war testing of Arisaka rifles revealed that their bolts and receivers were constructed of carbon steel "similar to SAE steel grade No. 1085 with a carbon content of 0.80% to 0.90%, and a manganese content of 0.60% to 0.90%." Destructive stress-tests have shown Arisaka rifles to be stronger than the American-made M1903 Springfield, British-made Lee–Enfield, and German Mauser rifles. The Arisaka rifles were some of the few firearms of their era to use polygonal rifling in their barrel, rather than "lands and grooves".

Some of the early-issue Type 99 rifles were fitted with a folding wire monopod intended to improve accuracy when fired from a prone position. The rear sights also featured folding horizontal extensions to give a degree of lead suitable for firing at aircraft. Near the end of World War II, ersatz models were manufactured with various cost-cutting measures, with the goal of cheaply bolstering the Japanese Imperial armed forces. Some of these cost-cutting measures included the replacement of the ovoid bulb-shaped bolt of earlier runs with a smaller, more utilitarian cylindrical shape. Additionally, the hand-guard on the barrel was omitted, and crude fixed-sights were fitted to the weapon.

The Arisaka bolt-action service rifle was used everywhere in the Imperial Japanese Army and the Imperial Japanese Navy. Prior to World War II, Arisakas saw service in the Royal Navy, in the Imperial Russian Army, in Finland and in Albania. The Czech Legions which fought between 1918 and 1919 in the Russian Civil War of 1917 to 1923 were almost entirely armed with Type 30 and 38 Arisaka rifles. Various countries, such as China, Thailand and Cambodia, used captured rifles both during and after World War II. After the Japanese surrender in the northern-hemisphere summer of 1945, the manufacture of Arisaka rifles and ammunition stopped abruptly and the items quickly became obsolete. As most weapons from the Imperial Japanese Armory were thrown into Tokyo Harbor after the signing of the surrender, ammunition for the Arisaka rifle also became rare, although China continued to manufacture 6.5×50mmSR and 7.7×58mm for use in their captured rifles.

The imperial ownership seal, a 16-petal chrysanthemum known as the Chrysanthemum Flower Seal stamped upon the top of the receiver in all official imperial-issue rifles, has often been defaced by filing, grinding, or stamping on surviving examples. This was done by surrendering Japanese forces in accordance with Military Defense Decree 1147 issued by the Japanese Ordnance Bureau in April 1914 requiring the removal of the chrysanthemum from all rifles leaving imperial service. Most of the Arisakas with surviving insignia are in Japan, though a few remaining from examples taken as war trophies before the surrender, and those captured by Chinese forces. Some of the captured Sino-Arisakas were later exported to the United States, examples including a number of Type 38 carbines and Type 44 carbines re-barrelled and re-chambered for the 7.62×39mm round. Some Type 38 rifles and Type 99 rifles captured by the Kuomintang forces were also converted to fire the 7.92×57mm Mauser round.

Many of the Chrysanthemum Seals were completely ground off, although some were only defaced with a chisel, scratched off, or had the number "0" stamped repeatedly along the edges. The latter was usually done with rifles removed from Japanese military service (and thus no longer the emperor's property), including rifles given to schools or sold to other nations, such as the British Royal Navy's purchase of many Type 38s in World War I to free up SMLE rifles for their land forces.

A very small run of Type 38 rifles was also manufactured for export to Mexico in 1910, with the Mexican coat-of-arms instead of the imperial chrysanthemum, though few arrived before the Mexican Revolution of 1910 to 1920 and the bulk remained in Japan until World War I, when they were sold to Imperial Russia.

Many thousands of Type 99s and other Arisaka variants were brought to the United States by Army soldiers and Marines as war trophies during and after World War II.

== Models ==
Arisaka model tree chart

Type 30 rifle
Type 35 rifle	Type 30 carbine	Export variants or licensed copies, e.g. Manchu Arisaka.
Type I Rifle (Kingdom of Italy)	Type 38 rifle
Type 38 short rifle	Type 38 carbine	Export variants or licensed copies, e.g. Estonian KL .303, Mexican Model 1913, Siamese Type 66, Thai Type 83, etc.
Type 44 carbine
Type 97 sniper rifle	Type 1 TERA rifle
Type 99 rifle
Type 99 long rifle	Type 99 sniper rifle	Type 2 TERA rifle

=== Type 30 ===
First rifle of the Arisaka series. Chambered in 6.5×50mmSR Type 30. 554,000 built.

==== Type 30 carbine ====
Carbine variant of the Type 30; 300 mm shorter. 45,000 built.

==== Type 35 ====
Officially designated as Type 35 navy rifle. Also in 6.5×50mmSR Type 30.

Design overhaul based on the Type 30 for the Imperial Japanese Navy Land Forces by Major Nambu Kijirō. Changes include tangent type rear sight, separate sliding bolt cover (as opposed to simultaneously moving ones on all other types after) of the same type later used on the Siamese Mauser style rifle, hook safety replaced with a large knob cocking piece to protect from gases in case of a blown primer, larger bolt handle knob, improved bolt head, gas port in bolt body, and improved chamber configuration for better cartridge feeding.

=== Type 38 ===
Developed by Major Nambu Kijirō. Chambered in 6.5×50mmSR Type 38, Type 30 cartridge is also usable. A short variant exists for ease of handling, its length is between the basic rifle and the carbine.

One of the most produced and commonly encountered model. Designed in 1905 and simultaneously produced until 1942 with 3,400,000 built.

==== Type 38 carbine ====
Carbine variant of the Type 38; 300 mm shorter. Also fielded by support personnel.

=== Type 44 carbine ===
Carbine derived from the Type 38 rifle. Chambered in 6.5×50mmSR Type 38, Type 30 cartridge is also usable. Distinguishing features are its folding spike bayonet and two-piece takedown cleaning rods concealed within the buttstock. Originally intended for the cavalry, also used by other support personnel.

=== Type 97 sniper rifle ===
One of the two main sniper rifles in imperial military service. Based on the Type 38 rifle. Chambered in 6.5×50mmSR Type 38, but more commonly used reduced charge cartridges associated with the Type 11 and 96 light machine guns for lighter recoil, reduced report, camouflaged muzzle flash, and overall accuracy. Uses factory-zeroed Type 97 telescopic sight (2.5X).

About 22,500 built.

=== Type 99 ===
Successor to the Type 38 rifle. Chambered in 7.7×58mm Type 99, later rimless variants of the Type 92 and 97 cartridges also usable.

Designed in 1939, then produced and fielded from 1941 to 1945, the Type 99 was the most common Imperial Japanese service rifle of World War II and second most produced imperial rifle with 2,500,000 built. Significant changes are the improvement of the rear sight form transitioning from a V-notch type like those on a Type 38, to an aperture, the front sight blade was renewed to a triangular shape, chrome-lined barrels were used, and on earlier productions, the rear sight was equipped with anti-aircraft calipers.

Sub-variations included a long rifle (approximately only 38,000 made), and short rifle; former being 1258 mm in total and latter being 1118 mm. The short rifle also varied in quality from initial, intermediate, to last-ditch.

==== Type 99 sniper rifle ====
The other sniper rifle of the Imperial Japanese Military. Built on both the long and short models with the latter being higher in number. Chambered in 7.7×58mm Type 99, later rimless variants of the Type 92 and 97 cartridges also usable. The larger, more powerful caliber allowed the ballistics to be less affected by windage at the cost of stronger recoil. Two different types of scopes were issued to the rifles: the Type 97 2.5X telescopic scope, or the Type 99 4X telescopic scope. Later production of the Type 99 scope allowed for distance adjustment. Scopes were issued with their respective holsters and were often detached from the rifle and placed within them while advancing.

By doctrine, snipers of the imperial military were selected by their skill in marksmanship. The caliber of the rifle assigned to a sniper corresponded with the ammunition of the company he served under.

Production began in May 1942. Total number made is approximately 10,000.

=== TERA ===
A small series of takedown rifles produced for the imperial army paratroopers and imperial navy paratroopers. The only production model is the Type 2 based on the Type 99 short rifle; the rest are two proto-test types (Type 100 and Type 1). The Type 2 is chambered in 7.7×58mm Type 99, later rimless variants of the Type 92 and 97 cartridges also usable.

The Type 2 allowed for compact storage by breaking down to two pieces: the stock and action, and barrel and handguard.

About a total of 19,000 were produced from 1942 to 1944.

== Bayonets ==
=== Type 30 ===
Created simultaneously with the Type 30 rifle, this sword-type bayonet is compatible with all variants of the Arisaka rifle except for the Type 44 carbine. Twenty different variations exist, and is further categorized by early, mid, and late-war production phases. Also fixable on Type 96 and 99 light machine guns.

=== Type 35 bayonet ===
The Type 35 bayonet is a slightly modified Type 30 bayonet made specifically for the Type 35 rifle. The dimensions of the bayonet are almost exactly the same as the Type 30 bayonet. The only significant difference between the two is the added addition of a sprung catch that hooks into the scabbard when not in use.

About 8,400,000 were made.

=== Type 44 ===
Fixed permanently on the Type 44 carbine, this spike-type bayonet is foldable under the handguard and does not interfere with the barrel when deployed.

=== Type 2 ===
With the long length of the Type 30 bayonet unfit for concealing within a paratrooper's personal equipment set, this knife-type bayonet was created to address this issue. Twenty centimetres shorter than a Type 30, its total length is 32.3 cm. Used primarily with the Type 2 TERA rifle or the Type 100 submachine gun by the Imperial Military Airborne Divisions.

About 25,000 were made.

== Details ==
As with all captured foreign firearms they may be dangerous when fired, due to both the lower quality of the "last-ditch" rifles produced during the end-half of World War II, and to modifications performed by returning U.S. servicemen on those rifles. Ammunition for the Arisaka series, which were often battlefield pick-ups, or souvenirs, were not readily available after the end of the war. Consequently, many were rebored or rechambered for readily available calibers of that time. Additionally, some were occasionally rendered inoperable prior to being shipped home, or even potentially sabotaged. The manner in which rifles may have been demilled can include permanently damaging the receiver or removal of parts.

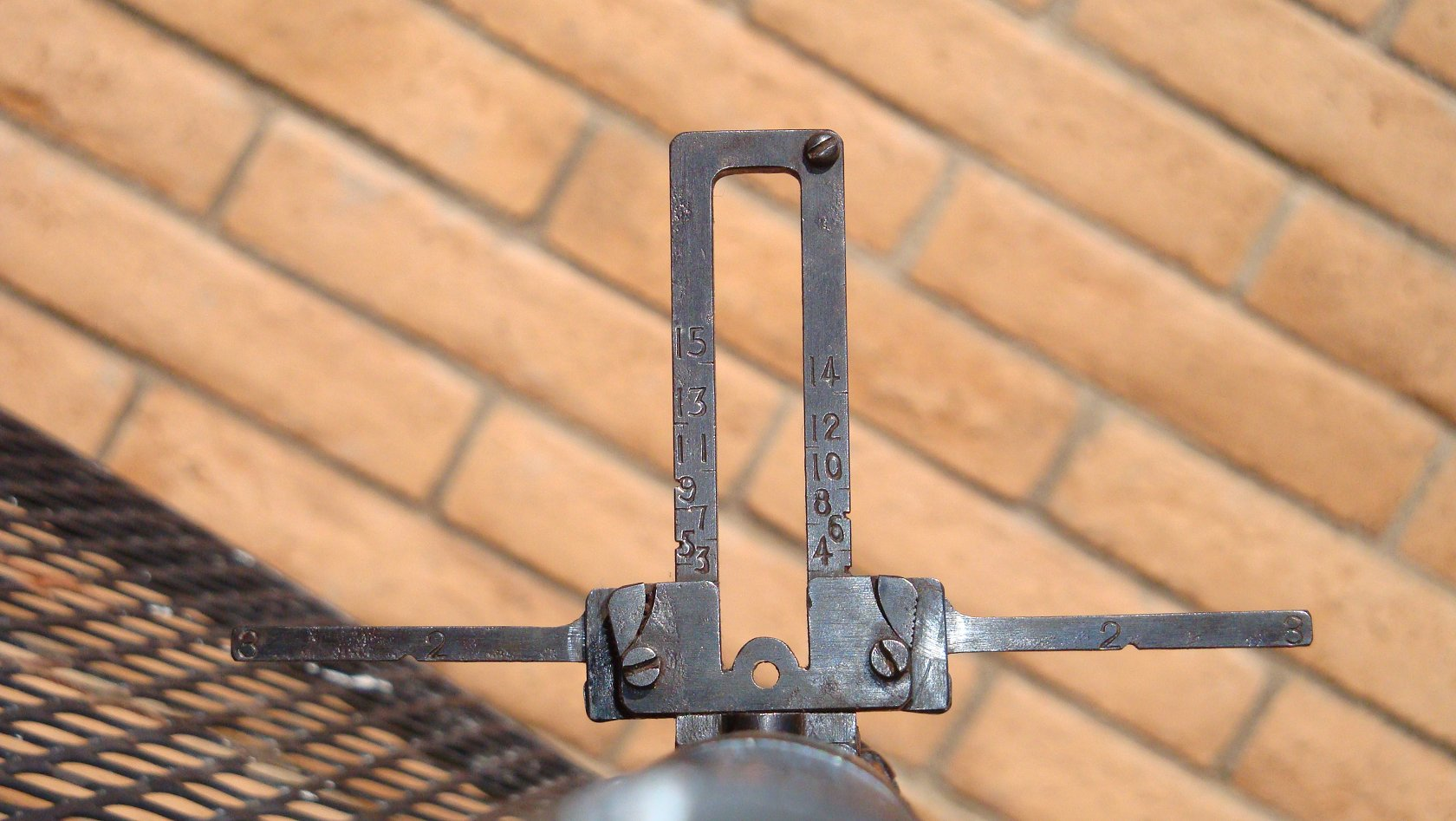
Rear sight of a Type 99 with intact anti-aircraft calipers deployed.

Type 38s in particular were commonly rechambered to 6.5×.257 Roberts, a wildcat cartridge made using the readily available .257 Roberts cases with the neck expanded to use 6.5mm bullets specific to the already existing barrel. Likewise, the Type 99 in 7.7×58mm were known to be converted to .30-06 Springfield, which is again of similar but not identical dimensions. While the .30-06 can be fired by lengthening the chamber of the rifle slightly (from 58 to 63mm), the 7.7mm case is slightly wider than the .30-06 and uses a slightly larger-diameter bullet, meaning a .30–06 cartridge case will swell slightly to fit the oversized chamber, and a standard .30-06 bullet with a .308 diameter will not provide a good fit to the .310–312 diameter rifling.

Those seeking ammunition for their Type 99 rifles often manufacture it by modifying .30–06 cases. The German 7.92×57mm Mauser cartridge may also be used with the proper .311 diameter bullet. The widely available British .303 bullets also provide a proper fit for the firearm's rifling. Norma currently manufactures stock 7.7×58mm ammunition, as well as making new brass available for reloaders. Hornady also produces new Arisaka ammunition in both 6.5mm and 7.7mm calibers. Since the base of the 7.7mm case is slightly larger than the .30-06 (thereby causing varying amounts of bulging in the reformed brass), some owners may find it preferable to use proper brass or new factory cartridges. Bullets and powder charges of surplus .303 British ammunition may also be loaded into proper 7.7×58mm cases to produce rifle cartridges with ballistics that are similar to the original Japanese military load.

== Users ==
- Empire of Japan: Used by the Imperial Japanese Army and Imperial Japanese Navy.
- Manchukuo: Used by the Manchukuo Imperial Army.
- Reorganized National Government of the Republic of China: Used by the Collaborationist Chinese Army.
- Republic of China: Captured from Japanese troops.
- China: Captured from Japanese troops.
- Siam: Used by the Royal Siamese Army.
- North Korea: Used in the Korean War.
- South Korea: Captured from Japanese troops and used in the Korean War.
- Philippines: Captured from Japanese troops.
- Mexico
- Russian Empire: Bought from Japan during World War I.
- United Kingdom: Bought from Russia during World War I.
- Spanish Republic: Rifles sourced from the USSR were used during the Spanish Civil War.
- Finland: Captured from Red Finns or left behind in Finland during World War I. Later used by the Civil Guard.
- Estonia
- Kingdom of Italy
- Kingdom of Albania

=== Non-state users ===
- Russian white movement: Used by some units of the White Army during the Russian Civil War.
- Czechoslovak Legion: Used during World War I and the Russian Civil War.
- (North Vietnam) Viet Minh: Captured rifles used during the First Indochina War.
- Viet Cong: Used during the Vietnam War.
- Lao Issara: Captured rifles used during the First Indochina War.
- Pathet Lao: Captured rifles used during the First Indochina War and the Laotian Civil War.
- Khmer Issarak: Captured rifles used during the First Indochina War.
- Khmer Rouge: Used during the Cambodian Civil War.
- Hukbalahap: Captured rifles used during World War II and the Hukbalahap rebelion.
- Malayan Peoples' Anti-Japanese Army: Captured rifles used during World War II.
- Malayan National Liberation Army: Used during the Malayan emergency.
- Indonesian People's Security Army: Captured rifles used during the Indonesian National Revolution.
- Pro-Indonesia militias of East Timor: A small number of rifles used during the 1999 East Timorese crisis.

== Gallery ==
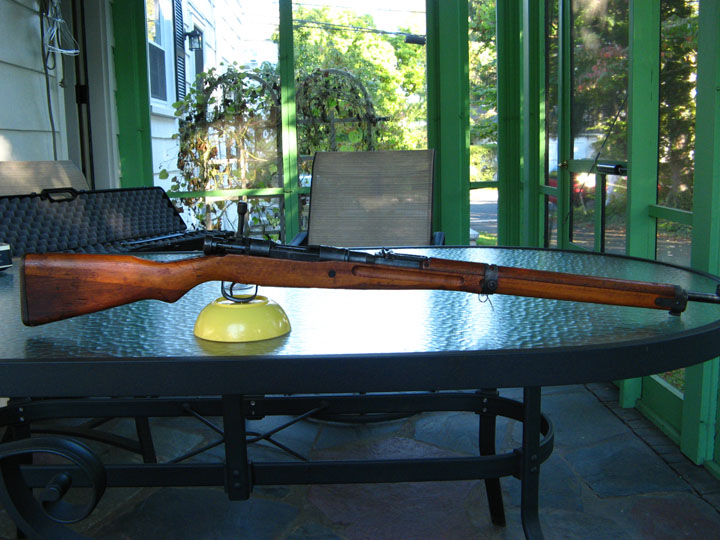
Full view of a late model Type 99

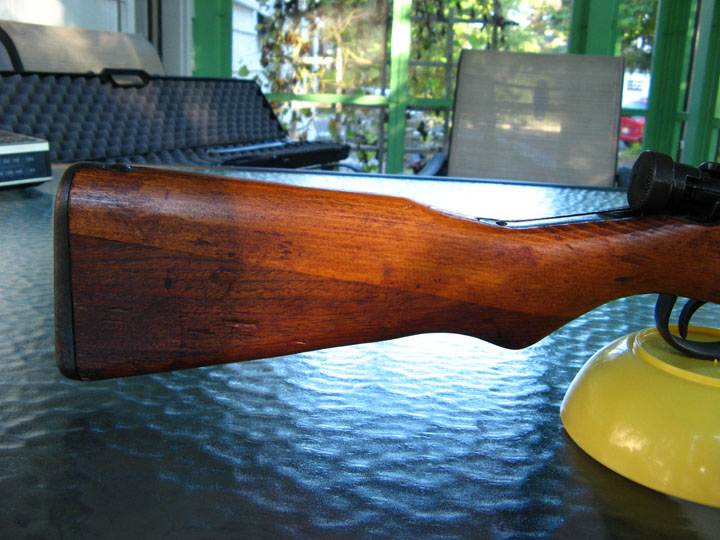
Buttstock of the Type 99

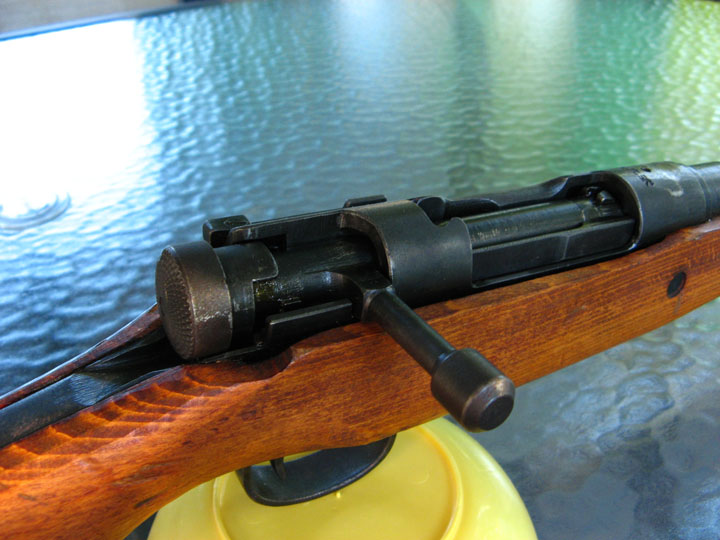
Locked Type 99 bolt

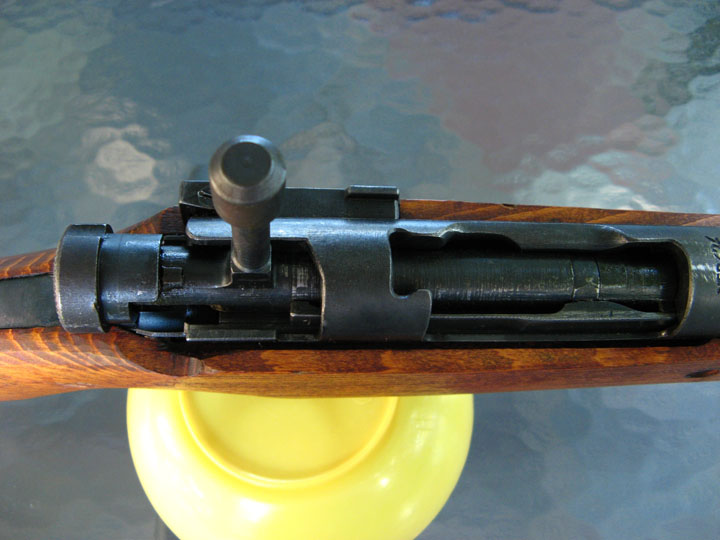
Unlocked Type 99 bolt

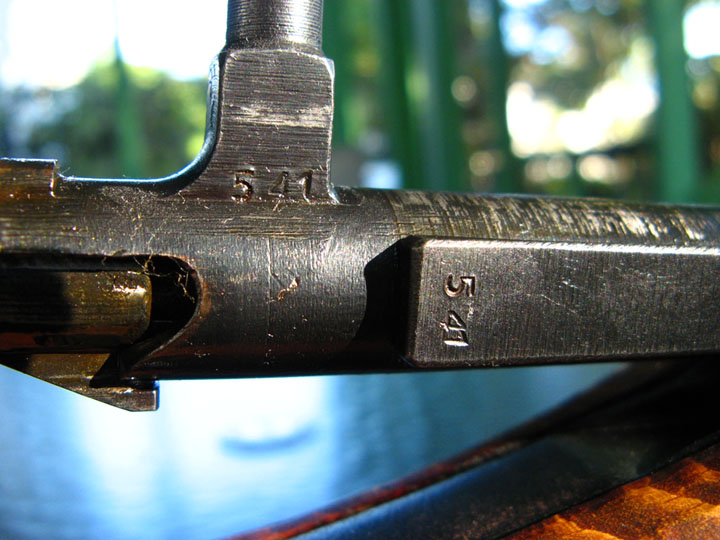
Close-up of the Type 99 bolt

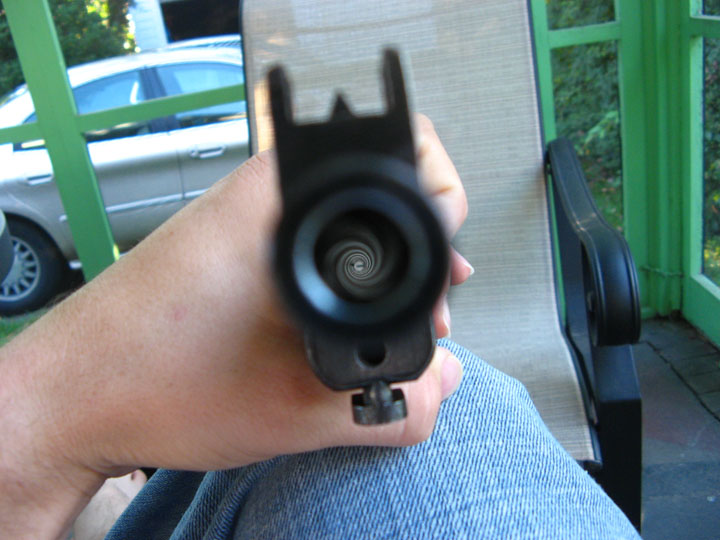
Barrel of the Type 99 showing rifling

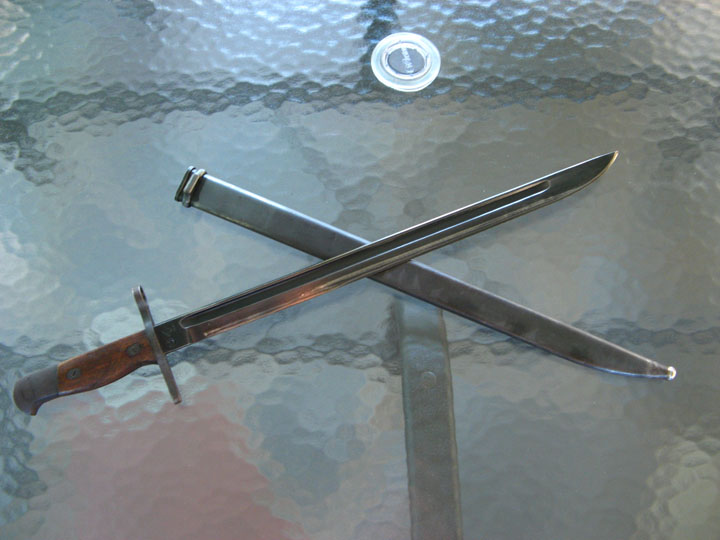
Type 30 bayonet

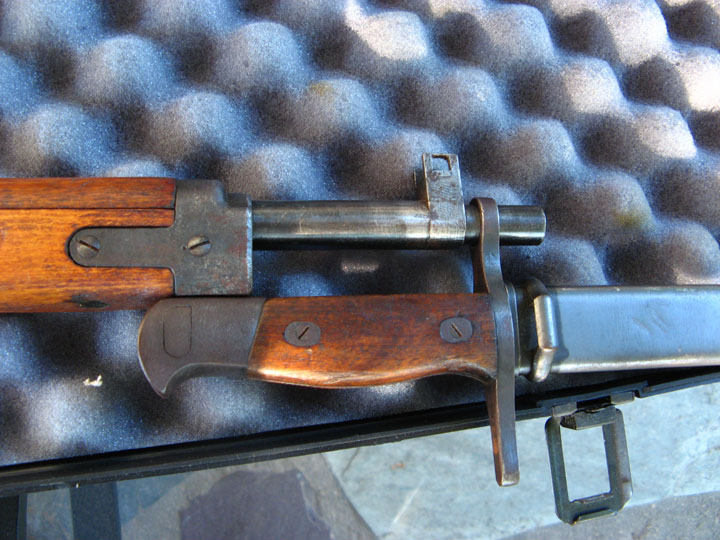
Type 99 with Type 30 bayonet attached

== See also ==
- List of Korean War weapons
- List of Japanese military equipment of World War II
- List of Thai military equipment of World War II
- List of weapons of the Vietnam War
- List of weapons of the Cambodian Civil War
- List of weapons of the Laotian Civil War

== Notes ==
Preceded by Murata	Imperial Japanese Army service rifle 1898–1945	Succeeded by End of the Imperial Japanese Military; M1 Garand
