= Type 97 sniper rifle =

Type 97 rifle
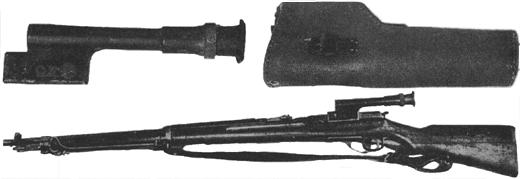
- Type 97 sniper rifle
- Type: Sniper rifle
- Place of origin: Empire of Japan

Service history
- In service: 1937–1945
- Used by: See Users
- Wars: Second Sino-Japanese War; World War II; Chinese Civil War

Production history
- Designed: 1937
- Produced: 1938–1943
- No. built: 22,500−23,500

Specifications
- Mass: 4.64 kg (10 lb 4 oz) (Note: 4.4 kg (9.8 lb) according to US Army manuals.)
- Length: 1,280 mm (50.2 in)
- Barrel length: 800 mm (31.4 in)
- Cartridge: 6.5x50mm Arisaka
- Action: Bolt-action
- Muzzle velocity: 730 metres per second (2,400 ft/s)
- Effective firing range: 370 m (400 yd) (iron sights) (Note: It's widely believed that the Type 97 telescopic sights, which were fixed and zeroed at the factory, limited effective range to no more than 270 m (300 yd), though Walter notes that it was a small disadvantage during the close-quarters fighting in the jungles of Southeast Asia.)
- Maximum firing range: 2,400 metres (2,600 yd)
- Feed system: 5-round internal magazine, stripper clip loaded
- Sights: 2.5x Telescopic sight

The Type 97 sniper rifle (九七式狙撃銃, Kyū-nana-shiki sogekijū) is a Japanese bolt-action rifle, based on the Type 38 rifle adopted in 1937, following Japanese combat experience in Manchuria. Although the Japanese planned on replacing it with the Type 99 sniper rifle, which had superior range and penetration, the Type 97 remained in service until the end of the World War II.

== Background ==
According to Ness, the Japanese were relatively late in the development of purpose-built sniper rifles. During the 1920s, trials with small numbers of Type 38 rifles fitted with scopes were conducted, but the Japanese apparently showed no interest.

In 1935, following combat experience in Manchuria, the Imperial Japanese Army conducted trials under the leadership of Colonel Tatsumi Namio to develop a new dedicated sniper rifle for the IJA. About 700 modified Type 38 rifles were made in Kokura Arsenal for trials; testing at the Futsu Proving Ground showed a 10% increase in accuracy at a range of 300 metres (330 yd) and 30% at 600 metres (660 yd) in comparison to the standard Type 38 infantry rifle. The new rifle was adopted for IJA service as the Type 97 sniper rifle in 1937.

== Design ==
The Type 97 was basically a slightly modified Type 38 rifle with a slightly longer bent down bolt handle (to avoid hitting the scope when open) and mountings for a telescopic sight.

The scopes have a fixed focus and a 2.5x magnification power with a 10° field of view. The scopes were zeroed at the factory and are not adjustable (each one set for a specific rifle and marked with the rifle's serial number), requiring the sniper to use reticule marks to compensate for range and drift. Offsetting the scope mounting to the left allowed the Type 97 to be loaded with single rounds or 5-round stripper clips, but also made the rifle somewhat awkward to aim. According to US Army manuals, the scope weighted 0.50 kilograms (1.1 lb).

Most rifles were fitted with a folding monopod, but with the deterioration of Japanese manufacturing capabilities as the war progressed, late production rifles no longer had monopods.

The Type 97 retains the internal five round internal box magazine chambered for the semi-rimmed 6.5×50mm Arisaka round and the leaf-type back sight graduated from 500 metres (550 yd) to 2,600 metres (2,800 yd) from the Type 38. The 6.5 mm round gives a light recoil, while the unusually long barrel (which allows more of the propellant to be burnt while the projectile is still on the barrel) gives little muzzle flash, which made counter-sniping difficult.

The Type 97 was manufactured at the Nagoya Arsenal and Kokura Arsenal, with approximately 14,500 produced at the Nagoya Arsenal, and 8,000 at the Kokura Arsenal according to Soto and Allan, while Walter gives a total of 8,000−9,000 Kokura-made rifles in 1938−1939 and about 14,500 Nagoya-made rifles in 1938−1943.

Kokura-made rifles were generally well-made, featuring flat buttplates, spring-retained barrel bands, and polished bolt faces, while Nagoya-made rifles usually had rounded buttplates, an adjustable 2,200 m (2,400 yd) leaf sight, screw-retained barrel bands, chromed bolts and the forend beneath the barrel hollowed out in an attempt to increase accuracy by minimizing contact between wood and metal. Late production rifles have a noticeably lower quality, with the bolts being blued instead of chrome-lined, and the monopod being discarded.

== Combat history ==
After fighting German-trained Chinese snipers in Manchuria, the IJA decided to develop snipers for themselves. By 1941, each IJA infantry platoon usually had a sniper, selected for his marksmanship skills, capability of living on with little other than water and rice, and psychologically capable of staying hidden for prolonged periods of time. At the start of the Pacific War, IJA snipers were equipped with the Type 97 on paper, but due to shortages of proper sniper rifles, they often had to use regular infantry rifles with iron sights instead. (Note: Although the Japanese captured a small number of sniper rifles from Allied forces in China, Dutch East Indies, Singapore, Malaya, Burma, and India, they apparently never considered pressing them into service to alleviate the shortage of Type 97 and Type 99 sniper rifles.)

Although the Japanese would later introduce the Type 99 sniper rifle to take advantage of the 7.7×58mm Arisaka round's (used by the new Type 99 rifle) superior range and penetration, the Type 97 remained in service for the rest of the war, with many IJA snipers preferring the 6.5x50mmSR Arisaka softer recoil and better accuracy at the close-quarters fighting in the jungles of Southeast Asia (Note: During the Pacific War, IJA snipers usually engaged their targets in ranges of less than 500 m (550 yd).) (the 6.5 mm round had a flatter trajectory than either the 7.7 mm Arisaka or the 30-06 Springfield, at least at short range).

While the Type 97 was less capable of penetrating thick foliage than the M1903 Springfield or M1 Garand, it still could penetrate a M1 helmet at a range of 140 m (150 yd) or more, while the small amount of smoke and muzzle flash it produced during firing allowed Japanese snipers to take position on treetops and fire while avoiding being detected. A common (and successful) counter-sniping tactic employed by the Allies was raking the treetops with machine gun fire. American soldiers sometimes made use of captured Type 97 rifles against their former owners, taking the advantage of the reduced muzzle flash to prevent their positions from being interdicted by the Japanese.

== Users ==
- Empire of Japan − Used by the Imperial Japanese Army
- United States − Limited use of captured rifles

== Bibliography ==
- Harriman, Bill (2019). The Arisaka Rifle. Bloomsbury Publishing. ISBN 978-1-4728-1613-9.
- Ness, Leland (2014). Rikugun: Volume 2 - Weapons of the Imperial Japanese Army & Navy Ground Forces. Helion. ISBN 978-1-912174-58-4.
- Soto, Victor A.; Allan, Francis C. (2015). Japanese Sniper Rifles of the Second World War. United States: Lodestone Publications.
- Walter, John (2024). Pegler, Martin (ed.). Sniping Rifles in the War Against Japan 1941–45 (Epub ed.). Bloomsbury Publishing. ISBN 978-1-4728-5830-6.
- War Department General Staff, United States (1943). Japanese Infantry Weapons. Washington, DC: U.S. Government Printing Office.
