= TERA rifle =

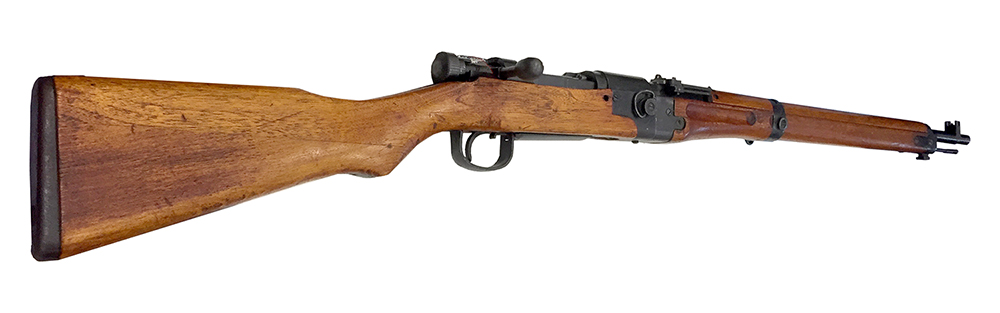
- Type 2 TERA rifle
- Type: Bolt-action rifle
- Place of origin: Empire of Japan

Service history
- In service: 1943–1945 (Type 2)
- Used by: Imperial Japanese Army; Imperial Japanese Navy
- Wars: World War II

Production history
- Produced: 1943–1945 (Type 2)
- No. built: 1,000 (Type 100 and Type 1); 19,000–22,000 (Type 2)
- Variants: See Variants

Specifications
- Cartridge: 6.5×50mmSR Arisaka (Type 1); 7.7x58mm Arisaka
- Action: Bolt action
- Feed system: 5-round stripper clip, internal box magazine

The TERA rifles (Japanese: 挺進落下傘小銃／挺身落下傘小銃, romanized: Teishin Rakkasan Shoujuu) were special Japanese takedown rifles developed for paratroopers of the Imperial Japanese Army and Imperial Japanese Navy. All designs were capable of either being broken down or folded into two parts and easily assembled or disassembled.

The Type 2 TERA rifle was officially adopted in 1943 by the IJA and saw use during the Battle of Leyte, but by the time it entered production, significant paratrooper operations had largely ceased.

== History and development ==
Before the Pacific War, Japanese paratroopers only carried a Type 94 pistol and three hand grenades when jumping out of planes. The length of the Type 38 and Type 99 rifles made them impractical to carry during deployment, so they were separately dropped in containers with their ammunition. The paratroopers often had difficulty locating and retrieving their rifles, forcing them to attack with only pistols, grenades, and whatever enemy weapons they could capture.

Development of dedicated paratrooper rifles were conducted by the 1st Laboratory of the 1st Army Technical Research Institute, which presented two different prototypes: the Type 100, which was designed to be carried broken down by a descending parachutist, and the Type 1 rifle, which could be carried with the buttstock folded.

While a handful of these prototypes were acquired by the IJA, neither were used during the Battle of Palembang, resulting in many rifles and heavier weapons of the IJA airborne forces being lost (a similar problem faced by German paratroopers during the Battle of Crete), and a renewed interest in developing a purpose-built paratrooper rifle.

In mid-1942, the 1st Laboratory developed a practical take-down design based on the Type 100, but instead of using an interrupted screw, the detachable barrel was held in place with a tapered wedge. Tests conducted by the Futsu Proving Ground in October 1942 were satisfactory, and after a few tweaks, the Type 2 paratrooper rifle was officially adopted in May 1943.

According to various sources, the Toriimatsu factory of the Nagoya Arsenal built around 19,000–22,000 of the rifles.

Some rifles were used during the Battle of Leyte, though significant Japanese airborne operations ceased by the time the Type 2 entered production. Many, if not, most of the surviving TERA rifles were captured by American forces in Leyte.

== Variants ==
=== Type 100 ===
The Type 100 was modified from the Type 99 rifle. The rifle features an interrupted screw between the barrel and the receiver, allowing both parts to be joined and separated by a 90° turn. The bolt handle was also detachable. The broken-down rifle could be carried in bags strapped to the paratrooper's legs. The rifle was not put into mass production since the locking mechanism was deemed as inadequate.

The Nagoya Arsenal built a few hundred rifles for the IJA and IJN airborne forces. Approximately 500 rifles were made in total.

=== Type 1 ===
A Type 38 carbine chambered for the 6.5×50mmSR Arisaka round with a hinged buttstock that could be folded behind the trigger guard, it could be easily readied for action at the drop zone. It was insufficiently robust enough for service and the IJA desired a 7.7 mm caliber rifle, resulting in the Type 1 being rejected. According to McCollum, the buttstocks had a tendency to wobble around while the hinge stud and wing nut used to keep the buttstock in place had a tendency of getting snagged on other objects, damaging the locking system. Around 500 rifles were made in total.

=== Type 2 ===
Similar to the Type 100 rifle, the barrel and receiver are joined together by a tapered wedge instead of the interrupted screw. The paratrooper used a folding wire ring to tighten the wedge lock. A detachable bolt handle and folding bayonet were tested, but ultimately rejected. Most rifles were fitted with the anti-aircraft rear sights of the Type 99 rifle, despite their questionable effectiveness.

The Type 2 was carried broken-down either in a canvas chest bag or with each halves in two leg bags. These were lowered on a short rope after the parachute opened.

== See also ==
- Poacher's gun
