= Type 99 sniper rifle =

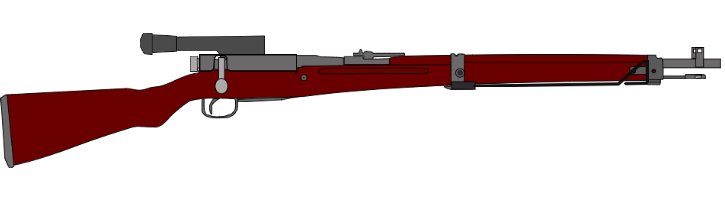
- CG picture of Type 99 sniper rifle
- Type: Sniper rifle
- Place of origin: Empire of Japan

Service history
- In service: 1942–1945
- Used by: Imperial Japanese Army
- Wars: World War II

Production history
- No. built: 10,850–11,000

Specifications
- Length: 1,100 millimetres (45 in) (Note: Smith notes that as the war progressed, Japanese rifles showed considerable variations in barrel length, overall length, and weight as Japan's manufacturing capabilities declined, though mechanically speaking they remained identical to early rifles.)
- Barrel length: 660 millimetres (25.8 in)
- Cartridge: 7.7×58mm Arisaka
- Action: Bolt action
- Muzzle velocity: 700 metres per second (2,300 ft/s)
- Effective firing range: 550 metres (600 yd) (iron sight); 1,500 metres (1,600 yd) (telescopic sight) (Note: Until the introduction of the adjustable Type 2 telescopic sight, the actual effective firing range is widely believed to be limited to no more than 270 m (300 yd) due the fact that Japanese scopes were zeroed at the factory, though Walter points out that it wasn't much of a disadvantage during the close-quarters fighting in the jungles of Southeast Asia.)
- Maximum firing range: 2,700 metres (3,000 yd)
- Feed system: 5-round internal box magazine, stripper clip loaded
- Sights: 2.5x or 4x telescopic sight

The Type 99 sniper rifle (九九式狙撃銃, Kyūkyū-shiki sogeki-jū) was a Japanese sniper rifle used during the Second World War. It was a sniper version of the Type 99 rifle, chambered in the 7.7×58mm round. Although it was intended to replace the Type 97 sniper rifle, the production rate was never able to meet wartime demands, and as result the Japanese used both the Type 97 and Type 99 sniper rifles until the end of the war.

== Background ==
In 1937, the Japanese adopted the Type 97 sniper rifle, which was a standard issue Type 38 rifle with a 2.5x telescopic sight fitted and a bent down bolt handle. The 6.5 mm round lacked power and accuracy at long ranges, so when the 7.7 mm Type 99 rifle was adopted, the Japanese conducted trials with long and short Type 99s modified as sniper rifles in 1941. Both models showed a substantial increase in accuracy (about 35%) in comparison to the standard infantry rifle while the difference in performance between the long and short rifles wasn't significant, so the latter was adopted for service. The rifle never received an official designation, being simply called as the Type 99 Sniper Rifle.

== Design ==
The Type 99 sniper rifle was largely identical to the Type 99 infantry rifle, with the main difference being the bent down bolt handle to avoid hitting the scope when open. The Type 99 sniper rifle was purpose-built by the factory, with each sight being adjusted for a specific rifle and marked with the rifle's serial number, though manufacturing tolerances weren't any more demanding than the regular infantry rifles.

Smith notes that the sniper rifle featured a somewhat better finish and a telescopic sight fitted to left side of the receiver. While offsetting the mounting to the left allowed the rifle to be loaded with single rounds or 5-round stripper clips, it also made the Type 99 somewhat awkward to aim. The scope had a fixed sight, a 2.5 magnification power, a 10° degree field of vision and weighted about 480 grams (17 oz). Since the sights could not be adjusted, the sniper used reticule marks to compensate for range and drift instead. Initial production rifles were fitted with the 2.5x scopes from the Type 97, but later on a fixed 4x scope with a 7° field of vision was standardized to take full advantage of the 7.7 mm round superior range and penetration. A few late production rifles were fitted with a new "Type 2" 4x scope, capable of limited adjustment.

According to Ness, about half of the Type 99 sniper rifles were fitted with the 4x scope, while Walter gives a total of 2,850 rifles fitted with the 2.5x scope: about 850 rifles made by the Kokura Arsenal in 1942 and about 2,000 Nagoya Arsenal-built rifles (between 1943 and 1945) possibly to make use of leftover 2.5x scopes after the production of Type 97 rifles was halted.

The Type 99 was considered a rugged rifle, with Smith declaring that it was one of the "simplest and most efficient of all the Mauser rifle variants".

== History ==
Introduced in June 1942, the Type 99 sniper rifle was intended to replace the Type 97 sniper rifle, but the Japanese never managed to produce enough rifles to meet wartime demand, and as a result both the Type 97 and Type 99 sniper rifles were used until the end the war.

As the war progressed, manufacturers simplified construction to speed up production and conserve raw materials: low-grade steel was used wherever possible, while other features such as bolt covers, sling swivels, and chrome plated bores were omitted. According to Ness, the Nagoya Arsenal built around 10,000 Type 99 sniper rifles and the Kokura Arsenal built around 1,000, while Walter gives a figure of 850 Kokura-built and 10,000 Nagoya-built rifles.

In the early stages of the Pacific War, Japanese snipers were successful at disrupting Allied advances picking off commanders and spreading fear amongst enemy soldiers. Japanese snipers were patient and operated from well camouflaged positions. Long distance shooting was rarely necessary in the jungle and as result, they also made use of iron sights for engaging their targets. According to Walter, most of their shots were taken at ranges of less than 500 metres (550 yd).

Once the Allies managed to regain the initiative, bolstered by an increase in production of weapons and equipment, Japanese snipers became less of a threat. Another important factor was the Japanese being increasingly unable to properly supply their forces in Southeast Asia with food and ammunition, due to Allied air superiority and submarine warfare inflicting heavy losses on shipping. The US Army and Marine Corps also made use of effective counter-sniping tactics, including raking treetops (widely used by Japanese snipers as firing positions) with machine gun fire.

== Bibliography ==
- Cloe, John Haile; National Park Service, United States (2017). Attu: The Forgotten Battle. Government Printing Office. ISBN 978-0-9965837-3-2.
- Harriman, Bill (2019). The Arisaka Rifle. Bloomsbury Publishing. ISBN 978-1-4728-1613-9.
- Ness, Leland (2014). Rikugun: Volume 2 - Weapons of the Imperial Japanese Army & Navy Ground Forces. Helion. ISBN 978-1-912174-58-4.
- Smith, Walter Harold Black (1948). Rifles Volume Two of The N. R. A. Book of Small Arms. National Rifle Association of America.
- Walter, John (2024). Pegler, Martin (ed.). Sniping Rifles in the War Against Japan 1941–45. Bloomsbury Publishing. ISBN 978-1-4728-5830-6.
