= 7.7 mm =

7.7 mm may refer to:

- .303 British, also known as 7.7×56R
- Type 99 rimless 7.7 mm, Japanese bullets
- Type 92 semi-rimmed 7.7 mm, Japanese bullets
- Navy type 7.7 mm, Japanese bullets
