= Type 44 carbine =

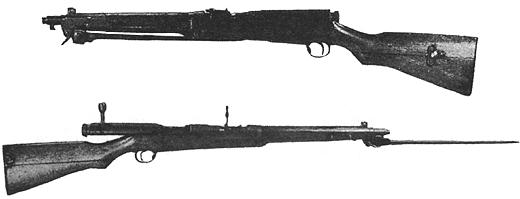
- Type: Cavalry carbine
- Place of origin: Empire of Japan

Service history
- In service: 1912–1960s
- Used by: See Users
- Wars: World War I Second Sino-Japanese War; World War II; Chinese Civil War; Indonesian National Revolution; Korean War; First Indochina War; Malayan Emergency

Production history
- Designer: Nariakira Arisaka
- Designed: 1911
- Produced: 1911–1942
- No. built: 91,900
- Variants: See Variants

Specifications
- Mass: 3.3 kg (7.3 lb)
- Length: 966 mm (38 in)
- Barrel length: 487 mm (19.2 in)
- Cartridge: 6.5×50mm Arisaka; 7.62×39mm (post-war Chinese modified)
- Action: Bolt action
- Muzzle velocity: 700 m/s (2,300 ft/s) 6,5x50mm
- Effective firing range: 366 m (400 yd)
- Maximum firing range: 2,000 m (2,200 yd)
- Feed system: 5-round internal magazine

The Type 44 cavalry rifle (四四式騎銃, Yonyon-shiki kijū/Yonjūyon-shiki kijū) is a Japanese bolt-action rifle. This rifle is also often referred to as a Type 44 carbine. The Type 44 is sometimes confused with the Type 38 carbine, since both were based on the Type 38 service rifle. Designed in 1911 by Arisaka Nariakira, it is a carbine intended for cavalry troops. It had a fixed bayonet and was first issued before World War I. It was produced in large numbers and was still in production in the early years of World War II.

== History ==
The Type 44 entered production in 1911 and entered service in 1912 (the 44th year of the Meiji period, hence "Type 44"), and served on until the end of the Second World War in 1945, production of the rifle ran until three years prior to the end of the Second World War; 1942. Approximately 91,900 Type 44 rifles were produced by Japanese arsenals during these years.

Although it was intended for cavalry troops, many other units such as transportation units were issued these carbines and some cavalry troops continued to use the Type 38 carbine.

A Type 44 was donated to Australia to the Australian War Memorial to show standard weapons and equipment of a Japanese soldier after World War One.

After the war, the Type 44 continued to be used by the Chinese People's Liberation Army and Navy. Many of them were seen in the Chinese Civil War and in the Korean War.

Modern-day clones made as air guns are currently made in Japan by Tanaka Works.

== Development ==
Developed from the Type 38 carbine to provide a cavalryman a carbine with a bayonet and not be encumbered with weapons as before the trooper was required to have a Type 32 cavalry saber, a Type 38 carbine and a bayonet, the main difference being the bayonet is a needle type and it can be folded backwards and locks underneath the barrel.

A hook was located directly below the front sight on the right side of the rifle, replicating the hooked quillon of the Type 30 bayonet for use in the bayonet fencing techniques taught to Japanese soldiers of the period.

The Type 44 also included a compartment in the buttstock for which to store a unique two-piece cleaning rod. The cleaning rod storage compartment was accessed via an ingenious rotating door. It fired the 6.5×50mm Arisaka round, and capacity was an internal five-round box magazine, it was fed via five-round chargers.

The Type 44 was briefly used to experiment on using the 7.7×58mm Arisaka before it was dropped due to problems regarding recoil.

=== Variants ===
The Type 44 was produced in three variations (referred to as first, second, and third variations).

The major differences between variations was in the folding bayonet housing, which increased the length and durability with each variation. The changes to the bayonet housing was because of accuracy issues and to strengthen the stock. A minor difference between variations may be found in the cleaning rod compartment found beneath the buttplate.

First variation stocks had two holes drilled for each half of the cleaning rod, while second and third variations had single larger holes to house both halves of the cleaning rods.

After World War II, both Type 38s and Type 44s captured from the IJA were converted to use the 7.62×39mm cartridge since the PLA was being equipped with AK and SKS rifles in that caliber.

Two versions of the converted Type 38s and Type 44s consisted of rifles with just a SKS barrel or of a SKS barrel with a front stock cap and folding bayonet.

== Users ==
- China: Most used by the People's Liberation Army.
- Japan: Used by the Imperial Japanese Army's cavalry forces.
- Manchukuo; Used by elite cavalry units of the Manchukuo Imperial Army
- North Korea: Used in the Korean War.
- South Korea: Captured by Japanese troops and used in the Korean War.

== Bibliography ==
- Allan, Francis C. and Macy, Harold W. The Type 38 Arisaka 2007. AK Enterprises, U.S.A. ISBN 978-0-9614814-4-5.
