= Dōgane Giichi =

- 銅金 義一
- Born: March 15, 1900; Hiroshima, Japan
- Died: October 4, 1972 (aged 72); Japan
- Education: Imperial Japanese Army Academy; Tokyo Imperial University
- Military career
- Allegiance: Empire of Japan
- Branch: Imperial Japanese Army
- Service years: 1920–1945
- Rank: Major general
- Units: Army Technical Bureau; Kokura Arsenal
- Conflicts: Second Sino-Japanese War; Japanese invasion of Manchuria; World War II; Pacific War
- Awards: Military Medal of Honor
- Other work: Metallurgist and mechanical engineer

Dōgane Giichi (銅金 義一; March 15, 1900 – October 4, 1972) was a Japanese Army major general. He was also a metallurgist and mechanical engineer.

== Early life ==
Dōgane Giichi was born in Hiroshima Prefecture in 1900.

In 1920, Dōgane graduated from the Imperial Japanese Army Academy. He later graduated from the Department of Metallurgy at Tokyo Imperial University.

== Career ==
By the early 1930s, he was associated with the Iron and Steel Institute of Japan.

In 1933, Dōgane was awarded a Military Medal of Honor for participation in the Japanese invasion of Manchuria.

In the 1930s, the Imperial Japanese Army Technical Bureau decided to update the design of the aging 6.5mm Type 38 Arisaka rifle in order to improve its reliability and lethality. This project was undertaken as a collaborative effort between the Kokura and Nagoya Arsenals. Dōgane led the Kokura team, while the Nagoya team was led by Iwashita Kenzō. The improved 7.7mm Type 99 rifle was ready by 1939. Dōgane was apparently responsible for the Type 99's chrome plated bore among other contributions.

Dōgane also headed the design of the 20mm Type 98 and Type 2 anti-aircraft autocannons.

In 1941, Dōgane was promoted to colonel of artillery. The next year, he joined the research staff of the Army Technical Bureau. In 1943, he published an illustrated catalogue of the world's firearms entitled The Science of Firearms (銃器の科学, Jūki no kagaku) In 1944, he was promoted to major general and took up a post as director of the Kokura Arsenal's Itoguchiyama Factory (糸口山製造所).

In the early 1950s, Dōgane wrote an essay on the development and evolution of Japanese machine guns. He later worked with Howa in the development of the 7.62mm Howa Type 64 for the Japan Self-Defense Forces.

Dōgane died in 1972.

== Bibliography ==
- 銅金 Dōgane, 義一 Giichi. "銃器の科学 Jūki no kagaku". National Diet Library of Japan.
