= Type 99 rifle =

Japanese bolt-action rifle

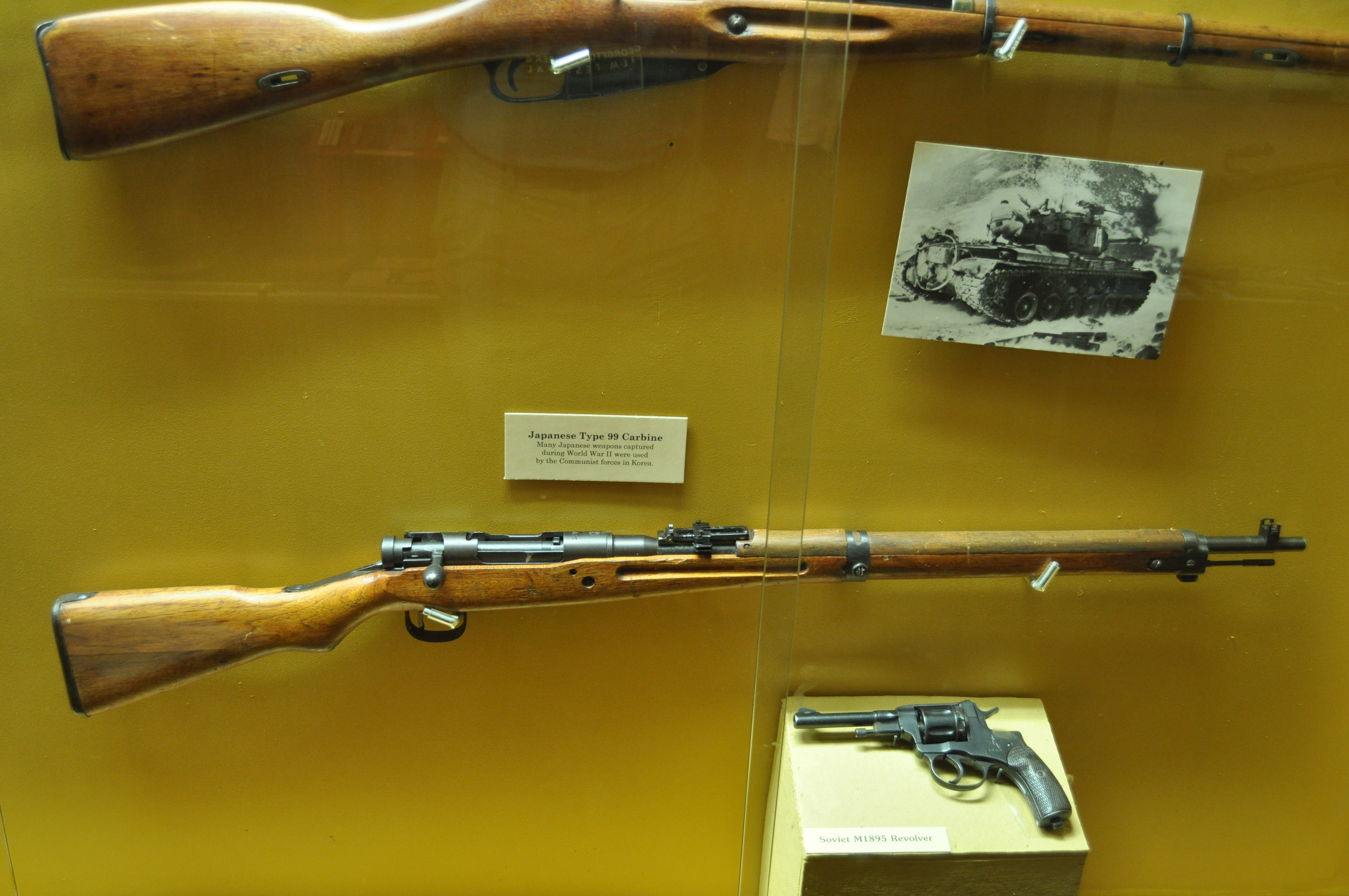
- A Type 99 short rifle between a Mosin-Nagant 91-30 rifle (above) and Nagant M1895 revolver
- Type: Bolt-action rifle
- Place of origin: Empire of Japan

Service history
- In service: 1939–1945 (Japan)
- Used by: See Users
- Wars: Chinese Civil War; Second Sino-Japanese War; World War II; Indonesian National Revolution; Hukbalahap rebellion Soviet–Japanese Border Wars; Korean War; Malayan Emergency; First Indochina War; Vietnam War

Production history
- Designer: Arisaka Nariakira; Kijirō Nambu; Dōgane Giichi; Iwashita Kenzō
- Designed: 1939
- Produced: 1939–1945
- No. built: ~3,500,000
- Variants: See Variants

Specifications
- Mass: 3.79 kg (8.4 lb)
- Length: 1,118 mm (44.0 in) or 1,258 mm (49.5 in)
- Barrel length: 657 mm (25.9 in)
- Cartridge: 7.7×58mm Arisaka; 7.92×57mm Mauser (KMT conversion).30-06 Springfield (South Korean/Thai conversion); 7.62×39mm (Post-WW2 PRC conversion)
- Action: Bolt action
- Muzzle velocity: 2,477 ft/s (755 m/s)
- Effective firing range: 656 metres (717 yd) with iron sight 1,500 metres (1,600 yd) (short) with telescopic sight 1,700 metres (1,900 yd) (long) with telescopic sight
- Maximum firing range: 3,400 metres (3,700 yd) (7.7×58mm Arisaka)
- Feed system: 5-round internal box magazine, stripper clip loaded
- Sights: Iron sights

The Type 99 rifle or Type 99 short rifle (九九式短小銃, Kyūkyū-shiki tan-shōjū) was a bolt-action rifle of the Arisaka design used by the Imperial Japanese Army during World War II.

== History ==
=== Japanese service ===
During the Second Sino-Japanese War in the 1930s, the Japanese Army found that the 7.7mm cartridge being fired by the Type 92 heavy machine gun in China was superior to the 6.5×50mm cartridge of the Type 38 rifle. This necessitated the development of a new weapon to replace the outclassed Type 38, and finally standardize on a single rifle cartridge. The Imperial Japanese Army (IJA) developed the Type 99 based on the Type 38 rifle but with a caliber of 7.7mm. The Type 99 was produced at nine different arsenals. Seven arsenals were located in Japan, with the other two located at Mukden in Manchukuo and Jinsen in Korea.

The IJA had intended to completely replace the Type 38 with the Type 99 by the end of the war. However, the outbreak of the Pacific War never allowed the army to completely replace the Type 38 and so the IJA used both rifles extensively during the war. As the war progressed, more and more cost saving steps were introduced in order to speed up production. Late war rifles are often called "last ditch" or "substitute standard" due to their crudeness of finish. They are generally as crude as the 1945 dated Mauser K98k of Germany, or worse.

The Type 99 was produced in four versions, the regular issue Type 99 short rifle, the Type 99 long rifle (a limited production variant), the take-down Type 2 paratroop rifle, and the Type 99 sniper rifle. The standard rifle also came with a wire monopod and an anti-aircraft sighting device. The Type 99 was the first mass-produced infantry rifle to have a chrome lined bore to ease cleaning. All of these features were abandoned by mid-war.

=== Korean service ===
Type 99 was used by both North and South Korea as a service rifle for second-line units and security personnel during the Korean War.

The Soviet forces that entered the Korean peninsula disarmed the Japanese military and transferred a small quantity to North Korea. The weapon became the standard service rifle of the 38-Guard Brigade. During the Korean War, part of the 38-Guard Brigade were still armed with Type 99. The 51st Regiment of the North Korean 7th Division, which was established based on the 38-Guard Brigade, failed to receive Mosin-Nagant rifles, leaving the entire regiment armed with Type 99 and Type 38. In addition, North Korea issued Type 99 to second-line units, such as the 110th Security Regiment and units under the 1st Combat Zone Security Command. North Korean riflemen armed with Type 99 typically carried 80 to 100 rounds of ammunition during operations.

On the other hand, South Korea acquired its Type 99 from Japanese inventory seized by the US military and from the Incheon Arsenal. At the outbreak of the Korean War, the South Korean military held over 19,000 Type 99s, but they quickly disappeared from the front lines as they were replaced by M1 Garands and M1 Carbines.

=== Use by other countries ===
During the Korean War, approximately 126,500 short and 6,650 long Type 99 rifles were re-chambered under American supervision at the Tokyo arsenal to fire the standard .30-06 Springfield cartridge. Apparently intended for the South Korean "gendarmerie", few rifles appear to have been issued at the end of the war in 1953. These rifles were fitted with lengthened magazine wells and had small notches cut in the top of the receivers to accommodate the .30-06 round's 1/3 inch greater length. Accuracy suffered, due to the difference in cartridges, rifling rate and characteristics, but they were nonetheless functional. Conversions to both .30-06 and 7.62 NATO as well 7.62 Russian have also been performed by civilians, often along with sporterising modifications.

After 1946, the Republic of China re-chambered an unknown number of Type 99 rifles to fire the 8×57 IS cartridge, as well as the 7.62×39mm cartridge, which were converted using SKS barrels. Indonesian forces used a large number of Type 99 rifles in the fighting against the Dutch during the Indonesian National Revolution (1945–1949), although late Japanese production was less reliable. Sniper rifles were also used. The Royal Thai Army received Japanese rifles of all types after 1945 and converted some short Type 99 rifles to fire the U.S. .30-06 cartridge during the early 1950s.

=== Nomenclature ===
In the West, Japanese equipment is commonly referred to as "Type XX", rather than "Model XX". In the case of a firearm, "model" is a more accurate interpretation of the Shiki (式) character, but the word "type" has become well-established by collectors for decades.

== Design ==
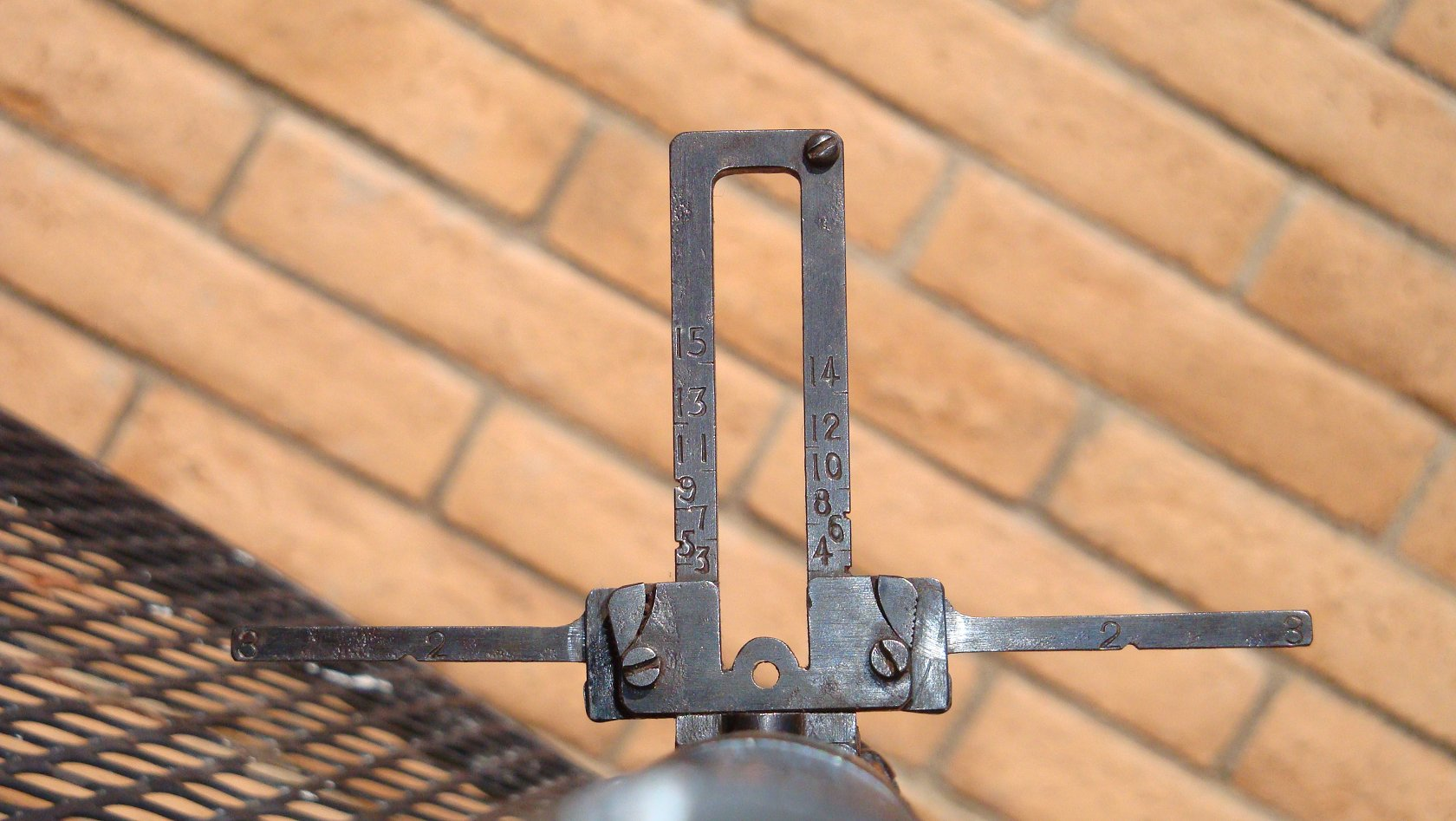
The flip-up anti-aircraft rear sights of a Type 99 rifle. The calipers on the sides are to determine the speed of the targeted aircraft. The vertical ladder is for adjusting the range of fire for land targets.

To gain the superior hitting power of the larger 7.7mm cartridge, several 6.5mm Type 38 rifles were modified for the new round. Although the tests proved satisfactory, the army decided that the added recoil and larger chambering for the 7.7mm cartridge would require an entirely new rifle to be built for the cartridge. It utilized a cock-on-closing action and an unusual safety mechanism, operated by pressing in the large knurled disk at the rear of the bolt with the palm of the hand and rotating it in a 1/8 clockwise turn, which is often misunderstood by Western shooters who are used to the Mauser's thumb lever safety. It featured a quick-release bolt and antiaircraft sights, as well as a dust cover for the bolt and a monopod. As a bolt-action rifle, the Type 99 was well developed, but as with all manually operated rifles used during World War II, they were often outclassed by semi-automatic rifles and submachine guns in close quarters combat.

The Type 99 has one of the strongest actions ever made for a bolt action, but many late-war (often nicknamed "last ditch") rifles had been simplified as Japan struggled industrially. The “last ditch” rifles are marked by the complete lack of finish, as well as shortcuts taken to ease production. The "last ditch" rifles are usually distinguished by their crudeness: poorly finished stock, wooden buttplate held in with nails, lack of an upper forward handguard, very obvious tooling marks in the metal, lack of the monopod, non-adjusting fixed sights and an unfinished bolt knob and handle. Despite these simplifications for ease of production, the quality and safety of the bolt action mechanism had not been compromised.

In some cases, these rifles may actually be training rifles intended for firing cartridges with a wood projectile only. The training rifles were made of mild steel and were never intended for ball ammunition. It is possible that reports of Type 99 rifles blowing up were simply the results of soldiers testing captured weapons. Unaware that they were using drill rifles, they fired ball ammunition in them with poor results and possible injuries. It is possible that this may have unjustly led to the Arisaka having a reputation (at least for the last ditch rifles) for being of poor construction.

The Type 99 can be fitted with a Type 30 bayonet. The Type 30 bayonet had a very long, slender blade, and was grooved to reduce weight. The early models featured a hooked quillion. These bayonets attached to a lug under the barrel and were further stabilized by a loop that fitted around the muzzle. Unmounted, it handled like a machete.

== Variants ==
=== Long rifle ===
The initial production rifle of the Type 99. Made only by Nagoya Arsenal and Toyo Kogyo under Kokura Arsenal supervision. Only about 38,000 were produced, 8,000 at Nagoya and 30,000 at Toyo Kogyo between summer of 1940 and spring of 1941 when production was switched to the much more common new Type 99 short rifle of which millions were made. The long rifle was found to be more cumbersome than the short rifle, and provided only marginally better performance. Thus, it was sidelined in favor of the short rifle, which was much more practical, required less resources to produce, proving more than satisfactory.

Like the early Type 99 short rifles, these Long rifles were made with a monopod, anti-aircraft lead arms on the rear sight and a dust cover.

=== Short rifle ===
In 1942, a Type 99 with a 660 mm (26 in) barrel was designed, and became the basis for the Type 99 sniper rifle.

=== 7.92×57mm conversions ===
Majority of the Type 99s were converted to fire 7.92×57mm ammo for the National Revolutionary Army.

=== .30-06 Springfield conversions ===
The Type 99 rifles used by South Korea were converted to .30-06 ammo, and was supplied to South Korean military prior to the Korean War.

Around 133,300 of them were reported to be used worldwide.

== Gallery ==
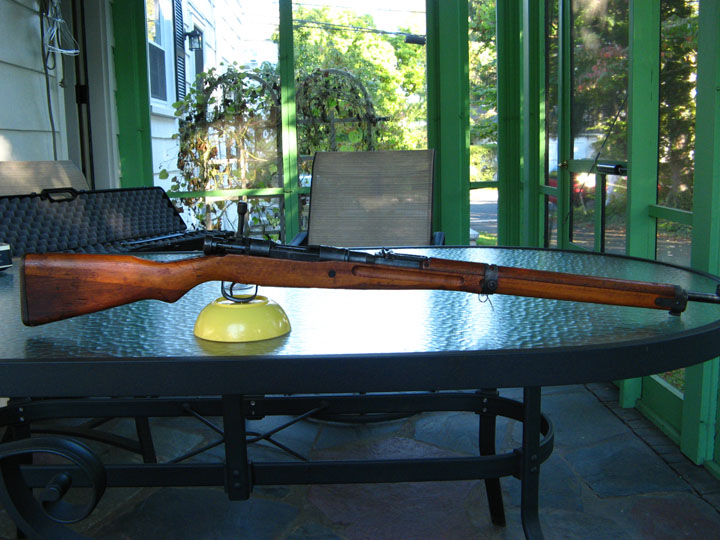
Full view of a late war Type 99

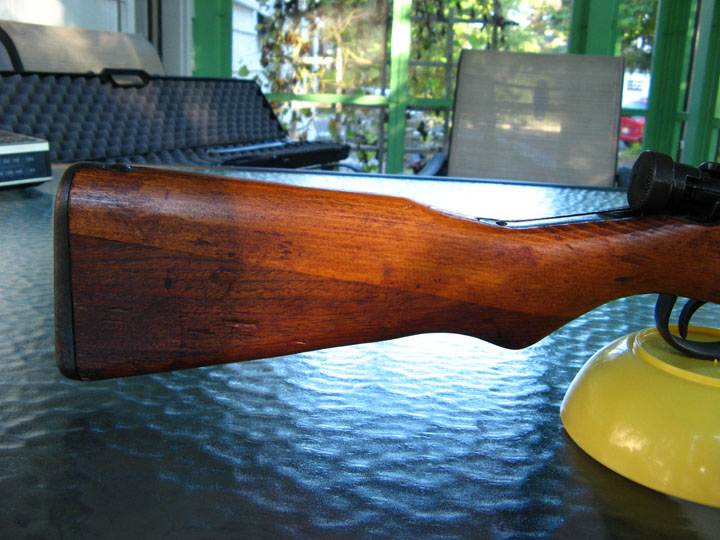
Buttstock of the Type 99

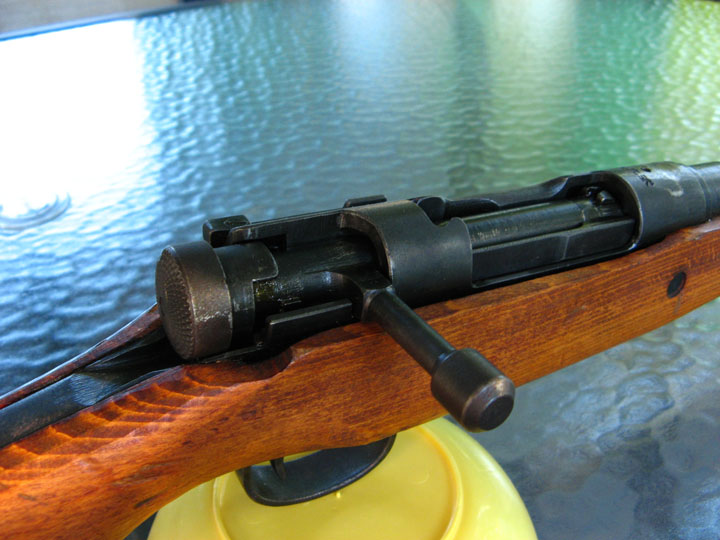
Locked Type 99 bolt

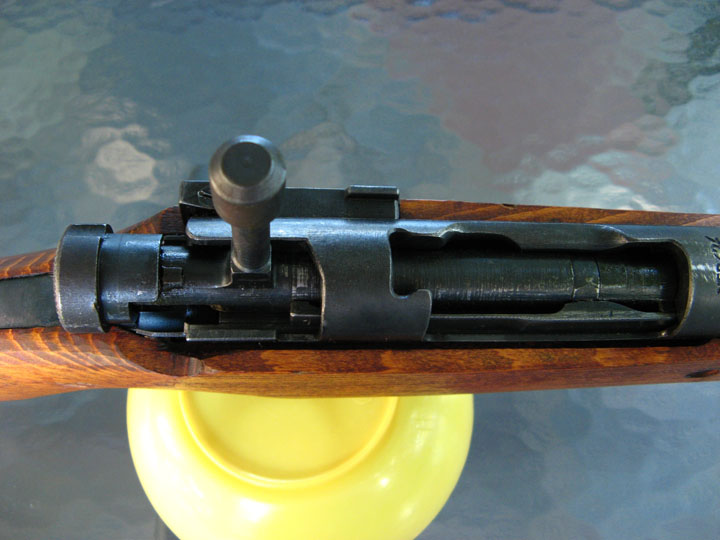
Unlocked Type 99 bolt

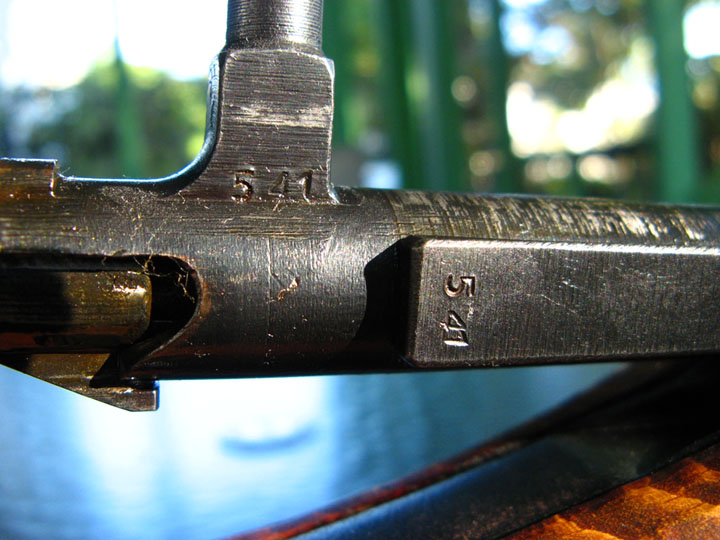
Close-up of the Type 99 bolt

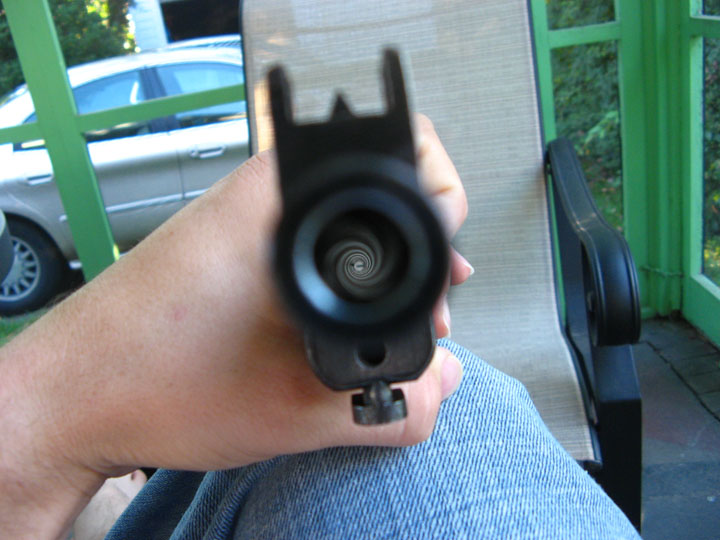
Barrel of the Type 99 showing rifling

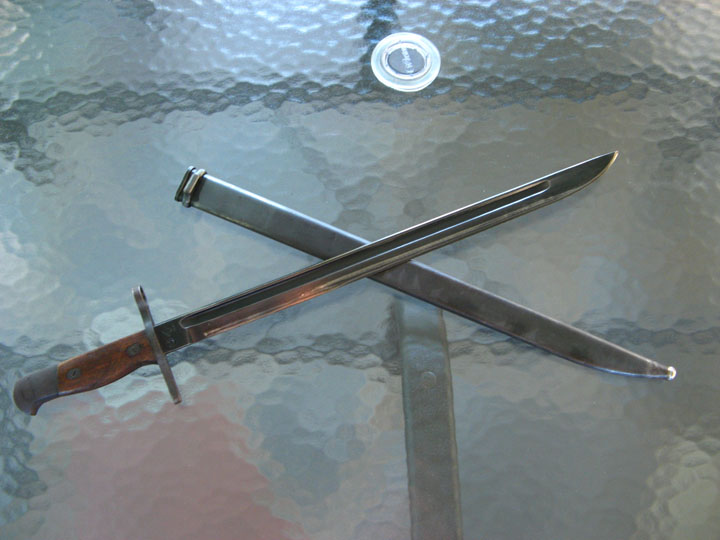
Type 30 bayonet

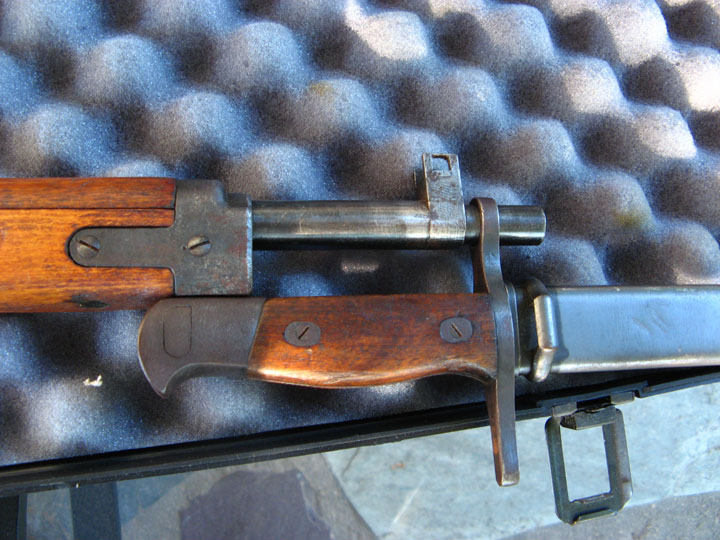
Type 99 with Type 30 bayonet attached

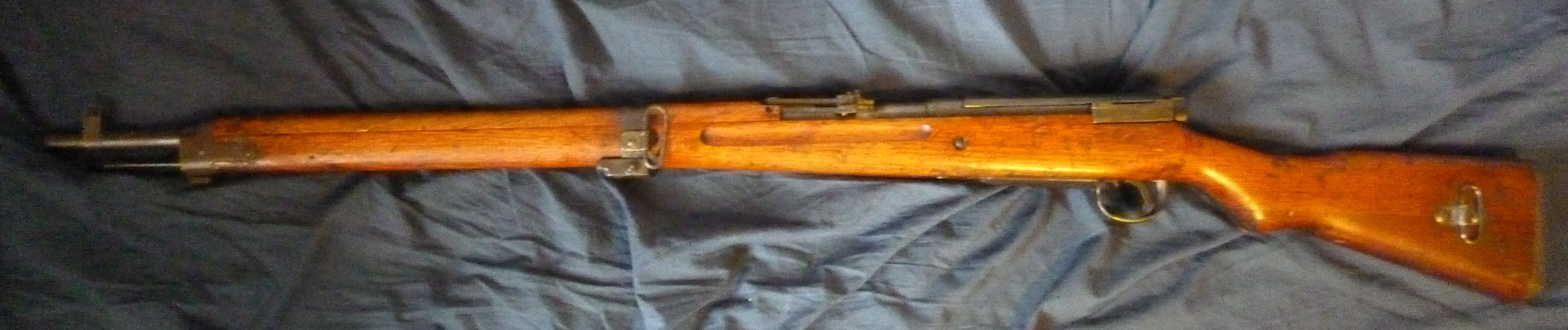
Full view of an early Type 99 short rifle

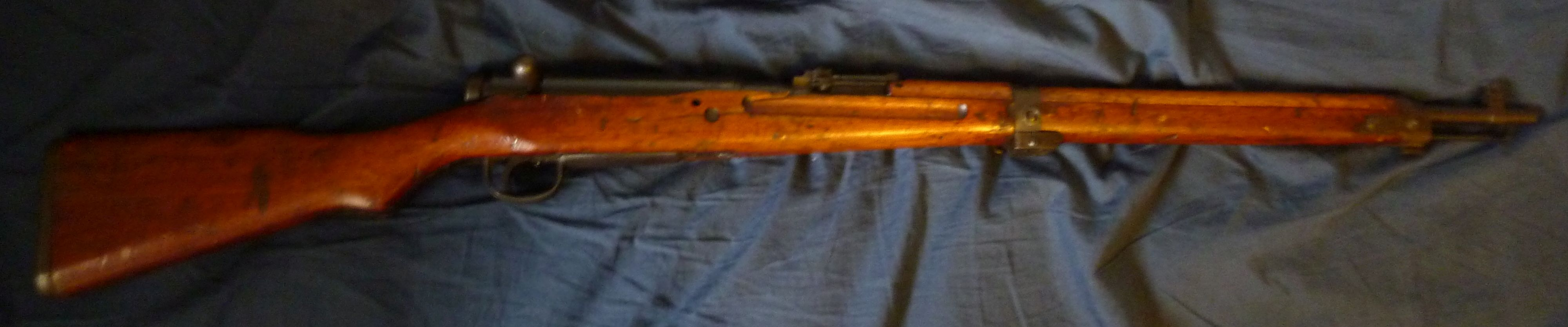
Full view of an early Type 99 short rifle

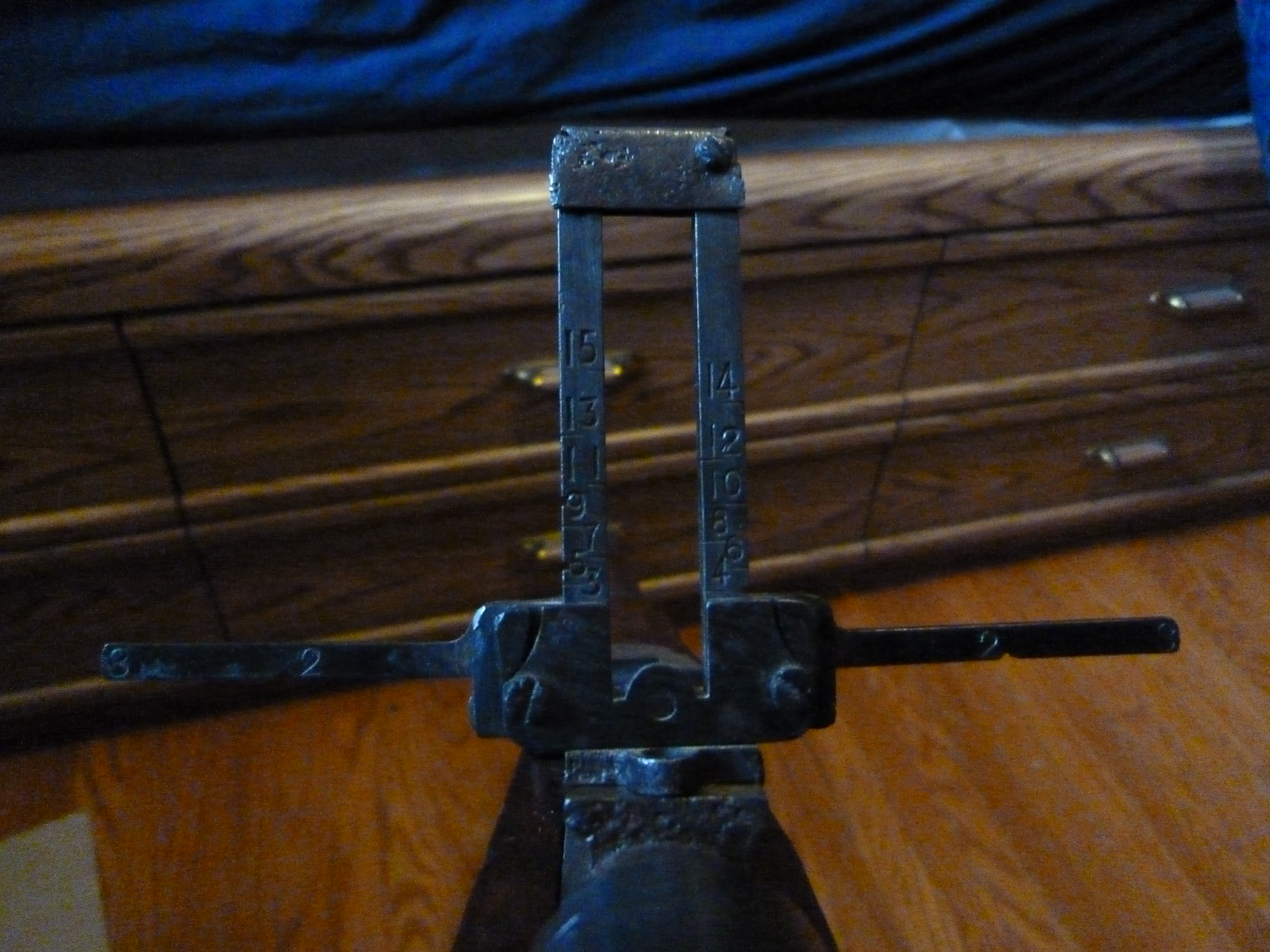
Flip-up anti-aircraft sights on Type 99

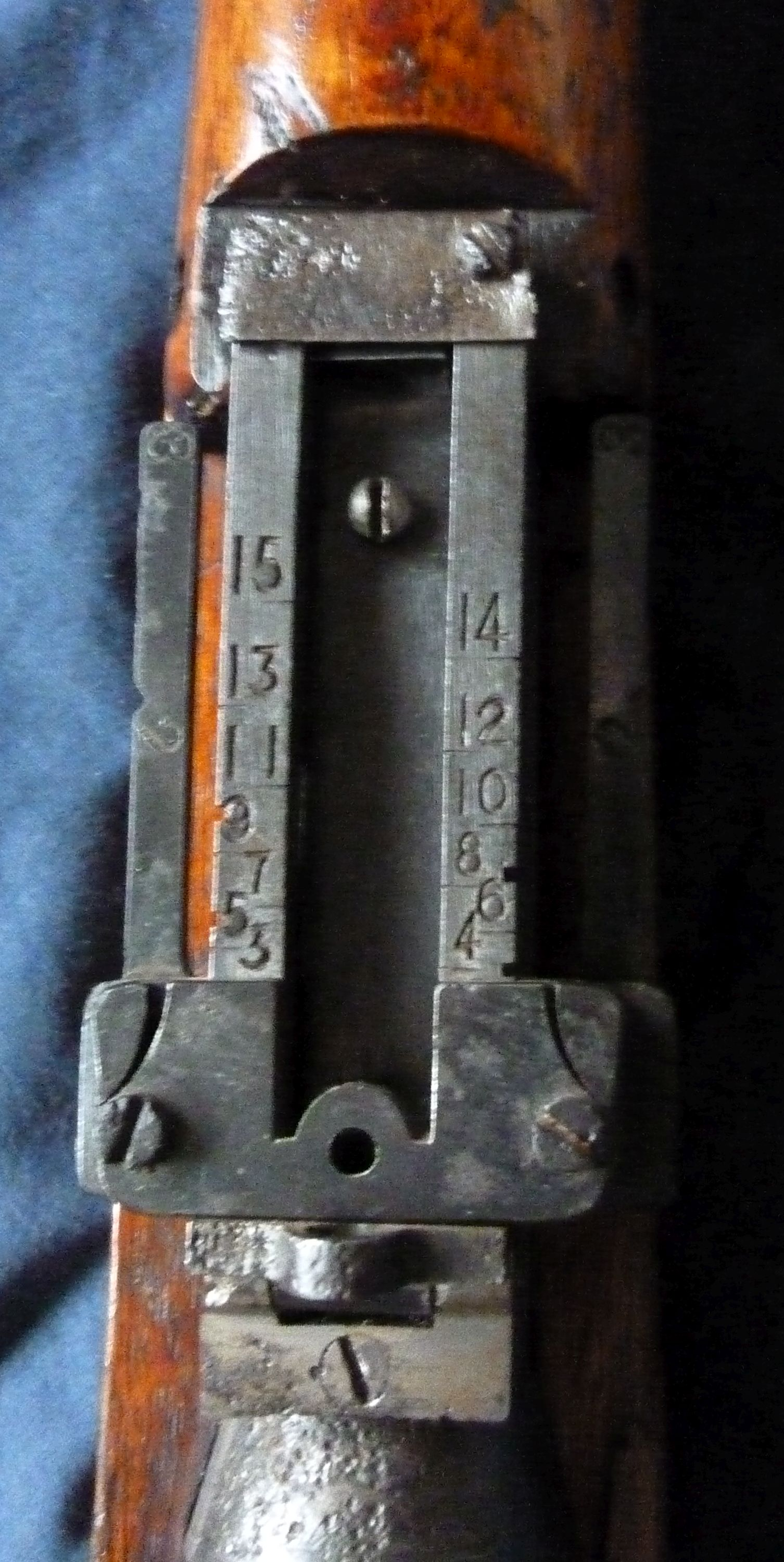
Flip-up anti-aircraft sights on Type 99, in the down position.

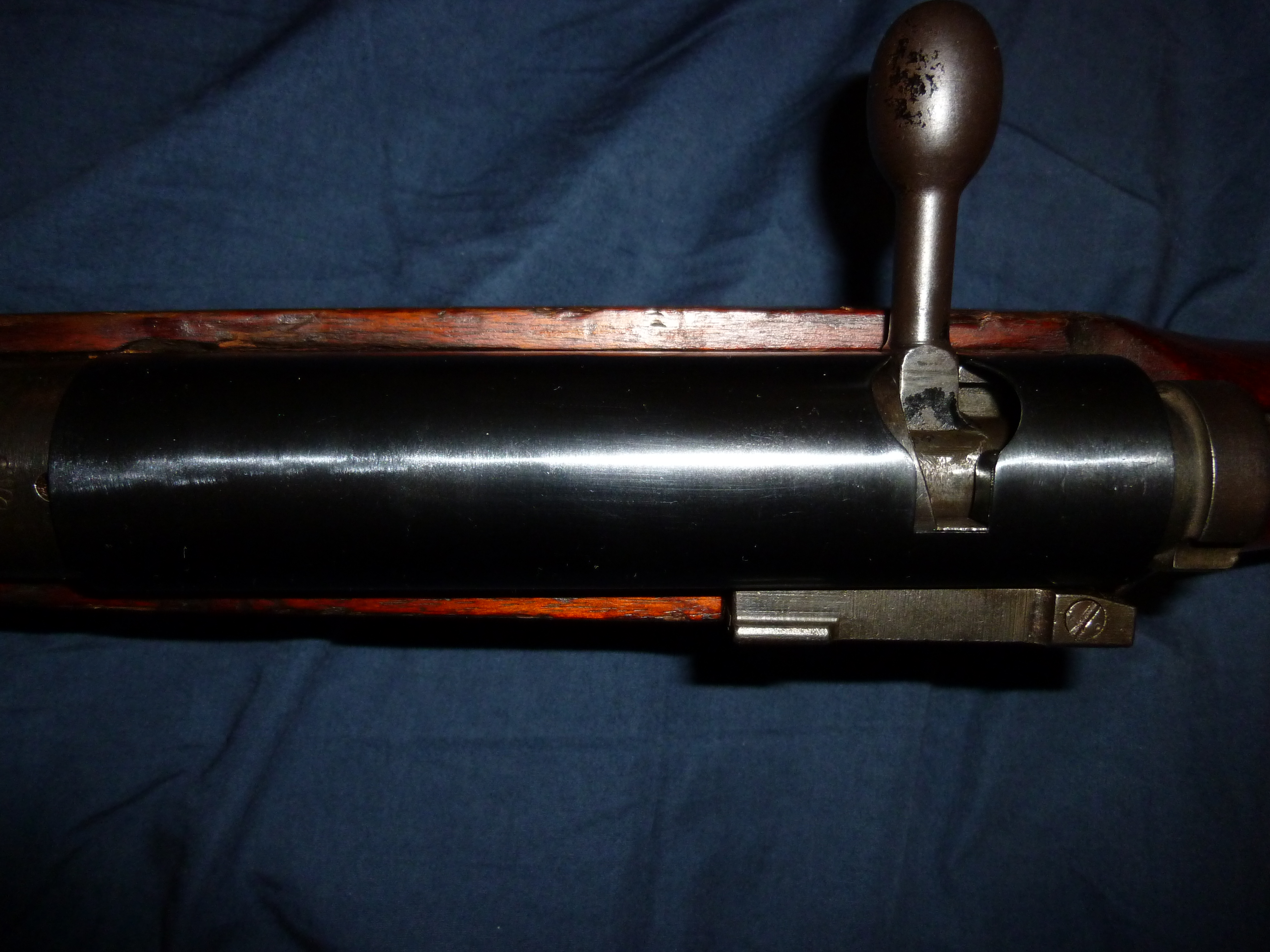
Dust cover for Type 99.

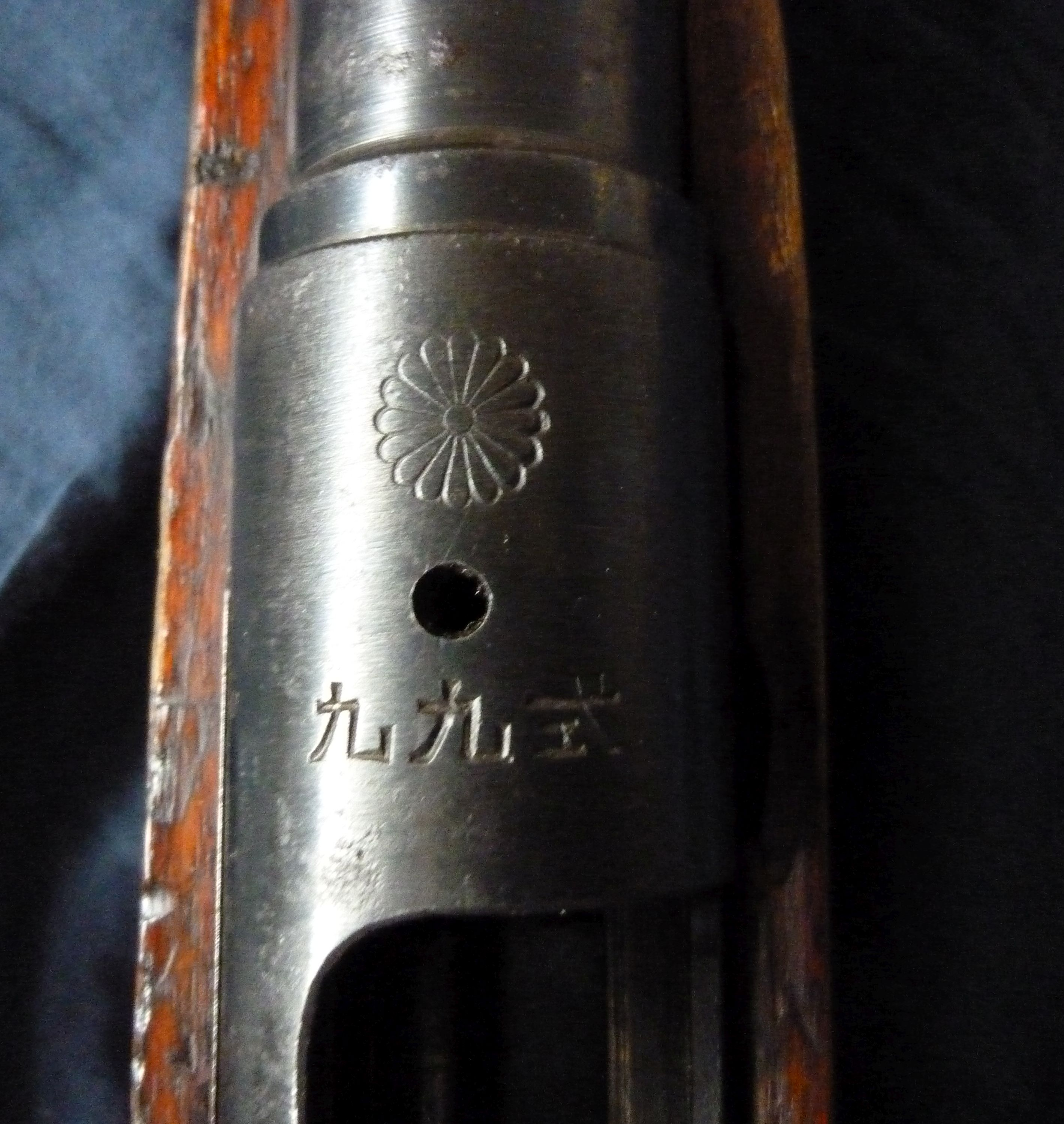
Type 99 with chrysanthemum

== Availability ==
Although the Arisaka rifle has never been exported to the United States, many are available as thousands have been brought home by US military personnel returning from the Pacific theater. In many cases, the imperial chrysanthemum atop the receiver has been defaced by the surrendering Japanese in order to preserve the Emperor's honor: the mark indicated that the rifle was the Emperor's personal property.

Rifles with an intact chrysanthemum often bring a premium on the collector market, sometimes almost double the price for a like model defaced rifle. As well, rifles retaining the original matching dust cover, anti-aircraft sights and monopod often hold extra value as well. "Last ditch" rifles hold a lower value than the early war rifles.

== Users ==
- Republic of China: Some re-chambered for the 7.92×57mm IS cartridge after 1946.
- People's Republic of China: 7.7mm (original) and 7.92mm (modified) versions still used by Chinese militias in the 1960s.
- Indonesia: Used during the Indonesian National Revolution.
- Empire of Japan
  - Japan: Type 99s converted to take .30-06 ammo used by the National Police Reserve.
- North Korea: Used during the Korean War.
- Philippines: Captured during World War II and used by Filipino guerrillas.
- South Korea: 60,000 rifles along with 500,000 rounds of ammunition were provided to Korean Constabulary in January 1946 as service rifle by the United States Army Military Government in Korea, and also obtained from Jinsen Arsenal at Incheon. The Armed Forces was equipped with 19,103 US Type 99, which chambered .30-06 Springfield, before the Korean War.
- Thailand: Some were converted to the .30-06 cartridge in the early 1950s.
- Vietnam: Used by Viet Minh during First Indochina War
