= Howa Type 64 =

Japanese battle rifle

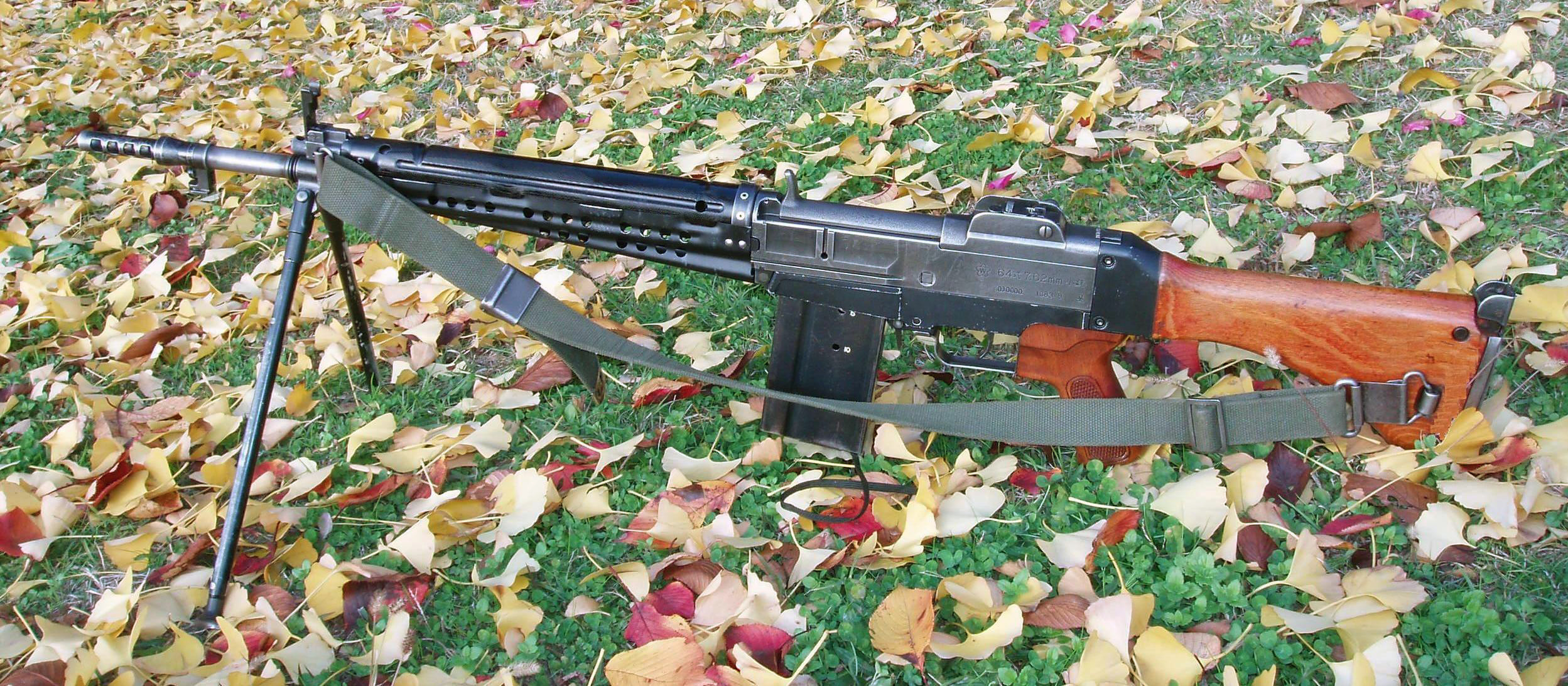
- The Type 64 battle rifle
- Type: Battle rifle
- Place of origin: Japan

Service history
- In service: 1964–present
- Used by: Japan Self-Defense Forces; Japan Coast Guard; Special Assault Team

Production history
- Designer: Iwashita Kenzō (岩下 賢蔵); Dōgane Giichi (銅金 義一)
- Manufacturer: Howa
- Unit cost: ¥188,000 (In 1985)
- Produced: 1964–1988
- No. built: 230,000
- Variants: See Variants

Specifications
- Mass: 4.4 kg (9.70 lb)
- Length: 990 mm (39.0 in)
- Barrel length: 450 mm (17.7 in)
- Cartridge: 7.62×51mm NATO (modified load)
- Action: Gas-operated short-stroke piston with tilting bolt, linear hammer fired
- Rate of fire: 500 RPM
- Muzzle velocity: 700 m/s
- Effective firing range: 400 m
- Feed system: 20-round detachable box magazine
- Sights: Iron sights

The Howa Type 64 battle rifle (64式自動小銃, Roku-yon-shiki-jidou-shoujuu), referred to as the Type 64 7.62mm rifle (64式7.62mm小銃), is a Japanese battle rifle used exclusively by the Japan Self-Defense Forces and the Japanese Coast Guard. It is a gas-operated, selective fire weapon which is chambered for the 7.62×51mm NATO round and uses a detachable 20-round box magazine.

Due to Japan's strict anti-hardware export laws, only one example of the Type 64 rifle has thus far been attested outside the country. It has been superseded by the more advanced Howa Type 89 from 1989 to 1990, but is still in service with all branches of the Self-Defense Forces and the Japanese Coast Guard. A small number of Howa Type 64 marksman versions have been used by the Special Armed Police unit.

== History ==
Roughly a decade after the creation of the Japanese Self Defense Forces, the Defense Agency decided to make a domestically designed and manufactured main battle rifle to replace the aging M1 Garand rifles that had been given to them by the United States.

It was developed by Howa Heavy Industries and eventually was produced in large numbers beginning in 1964 under the direction of General Kenzo Iwashita, who had a hand in designing the rifle. The Type 64 was given official trademark rights in 1964 on behalf of Howa with the rights granted in 1966.

Production was completed in 1988. As of 2020, the patent trademark has officially expired.

When compared to the M14 rifle for testing purposes, it was found to be superior in practical accuracy, likely because its rate of fire and recoil (from special reduced powder charge 7.62 NATO ammunition) were lower. However, it has had consistent problems during its service life due to its reportedly overcomplicated construction and is plagued by a false reputation for shedding parts during field use and overall unreliability.

The JSDF adopted the Type 64 in 1964. Some were provided to the SAP for use as DMRs when the first units were stood up.

== Development ==
The Japanese Defense Agency conducted research on which rifle the JGSDF should adopt to replace the M1 Garands in service. In response, Howa worked on creating prototype rifles for the JDA to examine.

The first prototypes, known as the R1 and R2, are based on the shape and features of the Armalite AR-10. Another prototype, known as the R3, is based on the M14 with a curved magazine. From feedback, another prototype known as the R63E was used as the basis for developing the Type 64.

=== Design ===
The Howa Type 64 fires from a linear hammer. The selector switch on the Type 64 is one of its most famous features due to the manner and order in which it is labeled: first ア (アンゼンソウチ/安全装置/Safety device (Safe)), then タ (タンシャ/単射/Semi), and レ (レンシャ/連射/Auto). Together, they spell アタレ (Atare); atare in Japanese means "Hit the target".

JASDF airmen using the Type 64

The weapon's stock was equipped with a hinged buttplate in order to improve accuracy during full-auto fire. The Type 64 has an external gas regulator to control cyclic rate as well as a rate of fire reducer to save the ammo consumption for use as a squad automatic weapon.

The iron sights consist of a flip-up rear aperture and post configuration. The rear sight, consisting of a disk aperture atop a squared housing for the circular range adjusting disk. This is located at the rear of the receiver, with short protective wings for when it is flipped down. The front sight is located at the front of the weapon by the gas block, and has a front post flanked by straight wings, which curve out slightly.

The magazine capacity is limited to 20-rounds of 7.62×51mm NATO ammunition. A notable feature of the cartridge used in this weapon is that the powder charge is reduced by about 10%, to reduce its inherently excessive recoil and muzzle climb. It was purposely produced with a reduced powder charge to be more suitable to the Japanese physique. The Type 06 rifle grenade can be used by the Type 64. To use it, the gas regulator needs to be used to cut off gas to the piston.

Because it was designed around this specialized cartridge, the rifle incurs substantially accelerated wear and tear from using full-powered ammunition. Still, the gas regulator has a setting to accommodate normal 7.62×51mm NATO ammunition.

The rifle has an empty magazine hold-open for the bolt, meaning that the bolt will stay open upon expending a magazine. But with the lack of a proper bolt hold-open device, the bolt slams forward upon removal of an empty magazine, much like the Yugoslavian Zastava M70 rifle series. The gas and bolt system is inspired by the FN FAL or the SVT-40.

== Variants ==
=== Designated marksman ===
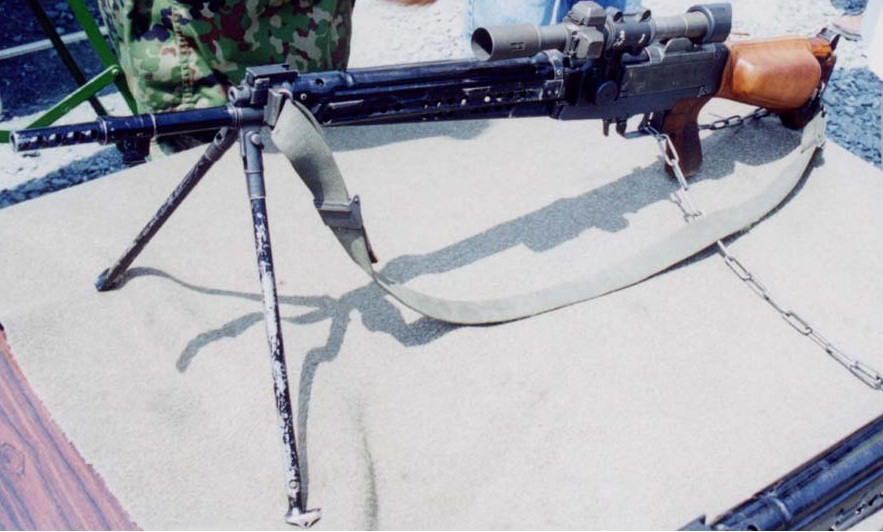
The designated marksman variant of the Type 64, equipped with a scope

Long range optics can be installed on the Type 64 rifle so it can be deployed as a sniper rifle. Issuing a Type 64 sniper rifle is usually granted to the individual with the most accurate shooting proficiency in each division (a designated marksman). However, in many cases the individual may simply be issued the scope by itself to be used only during training exercises and shooting competitions, while no specific rifle is assigned to the individual himself.

The issued optics are usually set at 2.2× magnification and may either be a surplus M1C/D sniper rifle M84 scope or a similar model produced by Nikon that replicates the M84's magnification levels. Performance is similar to the M1C/D sniper rifle but it is only possible to set the scope to view targets at 500 meters despite the elevation knob being labeled for up to 800 meters.

Some serious complaints about the accuracy of the sniper version are linked to the poorly conceived attachment system for the scope. The scope goes askew easily because it is only affixed with one screw. Since the scope is not usually assigned to any particular rifle it is often difficult to keep it static on any particular rifle's receiver. This is usually corrected by installing a piece of cloth between the receiver and scope mount, but then the iron sights of the rifle are obscured. In cases like this, it is necessary to install a cheek pad to properly align the user's eye with the scope.

The weapon has been phased out in front line units of the Ground Self-Defense Force as it was replaced with the M24 Sniper Weapon System, which entered use with the JGSDF in 2002.

== See also ==
- Madsen LAR
