= Arisaka Nariakira =

Japanese general (1852–1915)

Baron Arisaka Nariakira
- 有坂 成章
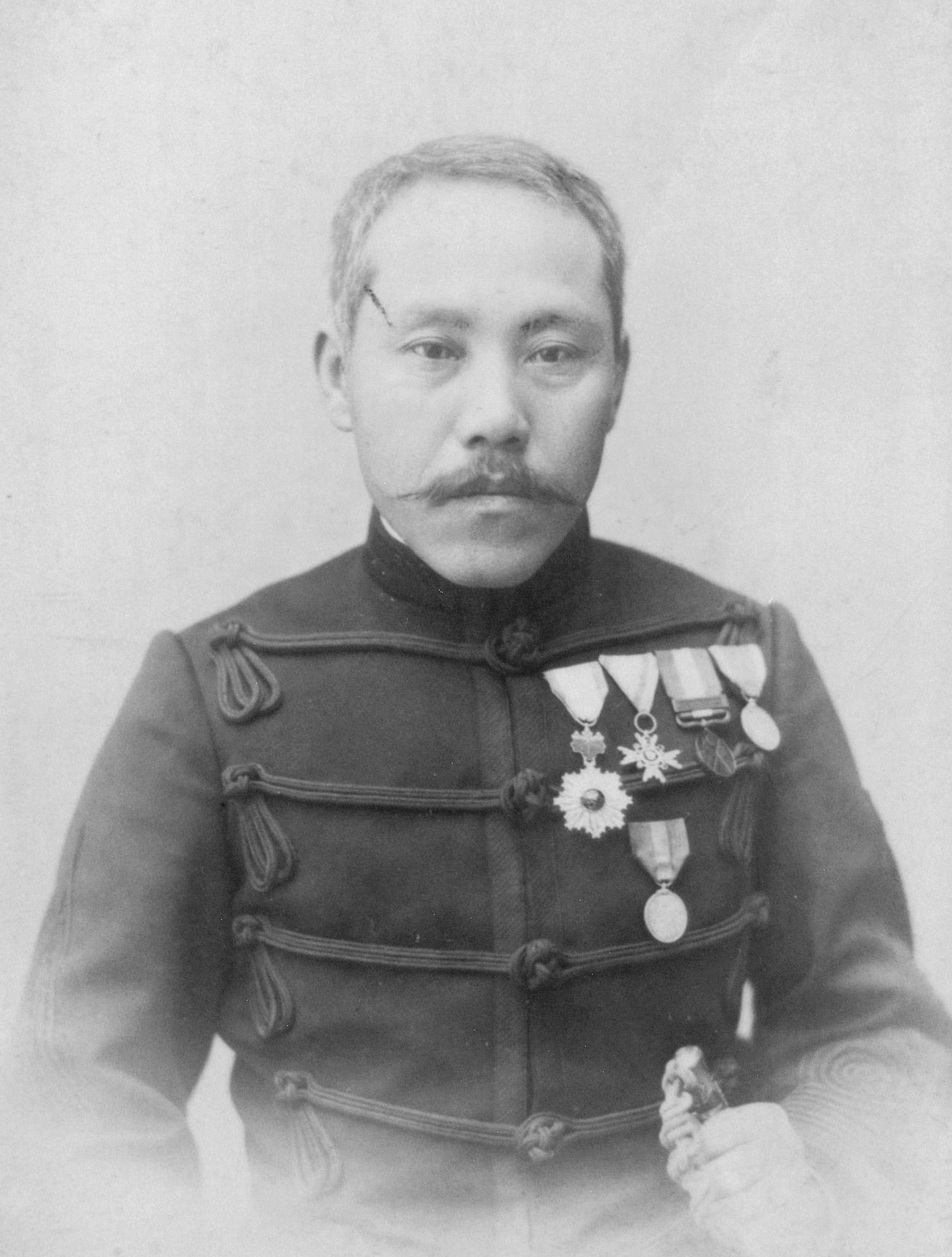
- Born: April 5, 1852; Iwakuni, Suo Province, Tokugawa shogunate
- Died: January 12, 1915 (aged 62); Tokyo, Empire of Japan
- Military career
- Allegiance: Empire of Japan
- Branch: Imperial Japanese Army
- Rank: Lieutenant General
- Commands: Army Technical Bureau
- Awards: Order of the Golden Kite (2nd class, 1906); Order of the Sacred Treasure (1st class, 1910)

Baron Arisaka Nariakira (有坂 成章; April 5, 1852 – January 12, 1915) was a lieutenant general in the Imperial Japanese Army. The inventor of the Arisaka rifle, he is regarded as one of the leading arms designers in Japanese history, alongside Kijirō Nambu.

== Biography ==
Arisaka was born in Iwakuni, Suo province (currently part of Yamaguchi prefecture) as the 4th son of a samurai retainer of Chōshū Domain. At the age of 11, he was adopted by firearms craftsman Arisaka Nagayoshi, from whom he took his family name. He served during the Boshin War and participated in the Battle of Toba–Fushimi. After the Meiji Restoration, he enlisted in the fledgling Imperial Japanese Army. In 1891, he caught the attention of General Murata Tsuneyoshi, designer of the Murata rifle, the standard Japanese Army rifle, and was appointed to a position in the Tokyo Arsenal.

In 1897, Arisaka completed work on the Type 30 rifle, an improvement on the Murata rifle, which was adopted by the Japanese Army as its standard weapon in time for the Boxer Rebellion. In 1898, he also completed design work on the Type 31 75 mm mountain gun, and his name became known in the world of artillery as well as small arms. However, his earlier designs were not well received by combat troops. The Type 30 Rifle was regarded as underpowered and lacked lethality. The Type 31 guns lacked recoil buffers and had poor accuracy.

In 1903, Arisaka was appointed head of the Army Technical Bureau. He oversaw a committee charged with improving older models, including the Type 30 rifle. The chief designer on the project was Captain Kijirō Nambu, who would later attain fame as a weapons designer on his own. The result of this project was the famous Type 38 rifle, otherwise known as the "Arisaka rifle", which was issued to front line infantry troops just in time for the end of the Russo-Japanese War of 1904–1905. The ruggedness of the Type 38 rifle was praised by combat troops, although the issue of its small caliber was not addressed until much later. The Type 38 rifle, and its various modified versions, continued to be used by the Japanese military until the end of World War II.

Throughout the Russo-Japanese War, Arisaka continued to work on improvements and variations to his rifles, and at the request of Chief of the General Staff Yamagata Aritomo, he also worked on designs for large caliber siege weapons and fortress guns. In 1906, Arisaka was awarded with the Order of the Golden Kite (2nd Class) and promoted to lieutenant general. In 1907, he was further elevated to the kazoku peerage when he was made a baron (danshaku). In 1910, he was awarded with the Order of the Sacred Treasure (1st class).

Arisaka died in 1915, and his grave is at the Yanaka Cemetery in Tokyo.

== In popular culture ==
In Cyberpunk RED and Cyberpunk 2077, Sasai Arasaka is regarded by Mike Pondsmith to be heavily inspired by Arisaka. The name of the Arasaka Corporation in the associated games is simply a modified version of his name; the corporation also began by selling firearms to the post-World War II "Federation of Japan".
