= Nagoya Arsenal =

Nagoya Arsenal was a collection of five major military facilities located in and around Nagoya, Japan. It produced various Japanese army and air war equipment during World War II including the Arisaka Type 99 rifle. Specific arsenal facilities were built, for example, in Atsuta, Chikusa, Takagi, and Toriimatsu.

== Toriimatsu ==
The Toriimatsu facility was responsible in part for production of the Type 99 rifle. The Toriimatsu facility was converted after the war into a paper plant (Oji Paper Industries), located in the city of Kasugai. Today the site may be reached from Nagoya on the Japan Railways Group Chūō Main Line, several stops northeast of Chikusa station.
