= 7.7×58mm Arisaka =

Japanese military rifle cartridge

Type 99 7.7 mm rimless
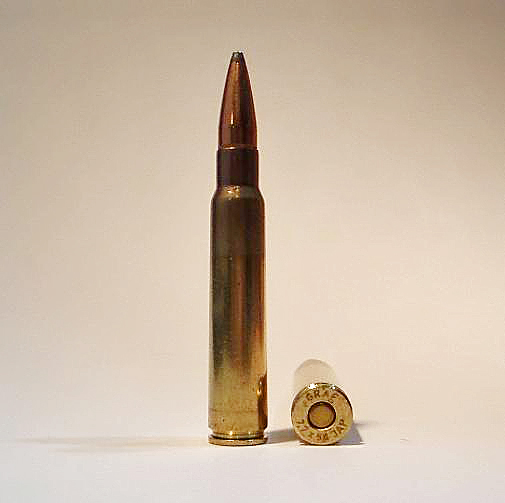
- 7.7×58mm Arisaka
- Type: Rifle
- Place of origin: Japan

Service history
- Wars: Chinese Civil War; Second Sino-Japanese War; World War II; Indonesian National Revolution; Hukbalahap Rebellion; Soviet–Japanese Border Wars; Korean War; Malayan Emergency; First Indochina War; Vietnam War

Production history
- Produced: 1940–1945 (Type 99)
- Variants: Type 92 semi-rimmed 7.7 mm, Type 99 rimless 7.7 mm (Arisaka), Navy type 7.7 mm

Specifications
- Parent case: 8×57mm IS
- Bullet diameter: 7.92 mm (0.312 in)
- Neck diameter: 8.58 mm (0.338 in)
- Shoulder diameter: 11.0 mm (0.43 in)
- Base diameter: 12.02 mm (0.473 in)
- Rim diameter: 12.07 mm (0.475 in)
- Rim thickness: 1.0 mm (0.039 in)
- Case length: 57.8 mm (2.28 in)
- Overall length: 79.6 mm (3.13 in)
- Primer type: Large rifle

Ballistic performance
Bullet mass/type	Velocity	Energy
182 gr (12 g) Type 97 ordinary cartridge	730 m/s (2,400 ft/s)	3,198 J (2,359 ft⋅lbf)
203.7 gr (13 g) type 92 ordinary cartridge	760 m/s (2,500 ft/s)	3,756 J (2,770 ft⋅lbf)
162 gr (10 g) Type 92 armor-piercing cartridge	820 m/s (2,700 ft/s)	3,363 J (2,480 ft⋅lbf)
165 gr (11 g) Type 92 incendiary cartridge	820 m/s (2,700 ft/s)	3,699 J (2,728 ft⋅lbf)
156 gr (10 g) Type 92 tracer cartridge	820 m/s (2,700 ft/s)	3,363 J (2,480 ft⋅lbf)

The 7.7×58mm Arisaka cartridge was the standard military cartridge for the Imperial Japanese Army and the Imperial Japanese Army Air Service during World War II. The 7.7×58mm cartridge was designed as the successor of the 6.5×50mmSR cartridge for rifles and machine guns but was never able to fully replace it by the end of the war.

== History ==
=== Development ===
Towards the end of WWI, the Japanese military would experience the 7.7mm projectiles in the form of the .303 British cartridge for machine guns mounted on early aircraft like the Ro-Go Ko-gata seaplane. While the Imperial Japanese Navy would continue to equip machine guns in rimmed .303 under the 7.7mm designation, the Imperial Japanese Army sought to develop their own 7.7mm cartridge in various semi-rimmed and rimless cases for the Infantry and the Army Air Service. A rimless 7.7×58mm cartridge was first tested for a prototype 7.7 mm infantry rifle in 1919. While the experiments would continue throughout the 1920s and 1930s, the development of an air-cooled aircraft machine gun took priority.

In 1920, the Imperial Japanese Army began the development of a new series of machine guns which led to the adoption of the Type 89 aircraft machine gun variants, and the 7.7×58mm semi-rimmed ball cartridge was designated in 1930. The 7.7×58mm ball bullet was lead-filled and had a cupronickel-plated jacket weighted at 10.5 g (162 gr). Tracer, armor-piercing, incendiary, and explosive rounds were also adopted as the Type 89 specialized ammunitions, and their designations would be updated in 1934 to Type 92 for air and ground use machine guns. The Type 89 ammunition would continue to be used in the Army aircraft throughout World War II. Following the adoption of the Type 92 heavy machine gun for infantry use in 1933, the 7.7×58mmSR Type 89 ball cartridge was modified to accept a 13.2 g (203.7 gr) bullet with a brass jacket as a heavier projectile was specially requested to improve the terminal ballistics. The ammunition was designated as the Type 92 ball cartridge for the infantry's heavy machine gun in 1934.

In 1937, however, rimless cartridges were found to have better performance in tests of Kijiro Nambu's ZB-30 clone, the Type 97 in-vehicle heavy machine gun fed with straight double-stack magazines (Zbrojovka Brno held a patent on a curved one for rimmed rounds, but for some reason Japanese hadn't copied it). As the result, the Type 97, 7.7×58mm rimless cartridge was adopted in late 1937 by reducing the Type 92 case rim from 12.7 to 12.0 mm while retaining the same bullet weight. The case of the Type 97 cartridge would later be modified in 1940 during the development of the Type 99 rifles and light machine guns, where it was decided that a lighter bullet of 11.8 g (182 gr) was more efficient on short range targets.

With the final adoption of the rimless Type 99 7.7×58mm ball cartridge in 1940, the rim diameter of the Type 97 cartridge was standardized to 12.1mm while the late production Type 92 ammunition was modified by reducing the diameter of the case rim from 12.7 to 12.1 mm to further simplify logistics. This effectively allowed the older 7.7×58mm variants, including the specialized ammunition, to be chambered into the Type 99 rifles and light machine guns with some discrepancy in accuracy due to the different bullet weights. Nevertheless, the existing semi-rimmed cartridges would remain in service for the Type 92 heavy machine gun during World War II.

=== Cartridge variants during World War II ===
7.7×58mm Japanese military ammunition variants during World War II
Bullet	Jacket	Marking code	Description
Ball	Gilding-metal	Pink or salmon ring	Jacketed lead-core bullet
Armor-piercing	-	Black ring	Brass bullet with a steel core
Tracer	Cupro-nickel	Green ring	Pyrotechnic core in a lead bullet
Incendiary	Cupro-nickel	Magenta ring	White phosphorus core in a lead envelope
High explosive	Gilding-metal	Purple ring	PETN core in a flat-tipped lead envelope

== Modern loadings ==
The 7.7×58mm Arisaka, as a sporting cartridge, is suitable for most big game with proper bullet selection. The 7.7 mm Arisaka can use the same .311–.312 inch bullets as the .303 British, and the standard military load delivered the same muzzle energy as the .303 British. Factory loaded ammunition and brass cases are available from Norma, Graf's, and Hornady, Sierra and Speer also produce usable bullets. Reloadable cartridge cases can be produced by reforming .30-06 brass, or by modifying and necking down the 8×57mm Mauser. Case heads derived from the .30-06 are slightly undersized and bulge slightly just ahead of the web on firing, while the 8×57mm IS derived cases are slightly short. Normal cases of the correct dimensions also bulge slightly, however, as most Japanese rifles of this era had slightly oversized chambers, intended to allow the bolt to be closed on a round even in a very dirty chamber.

== Gallery ==
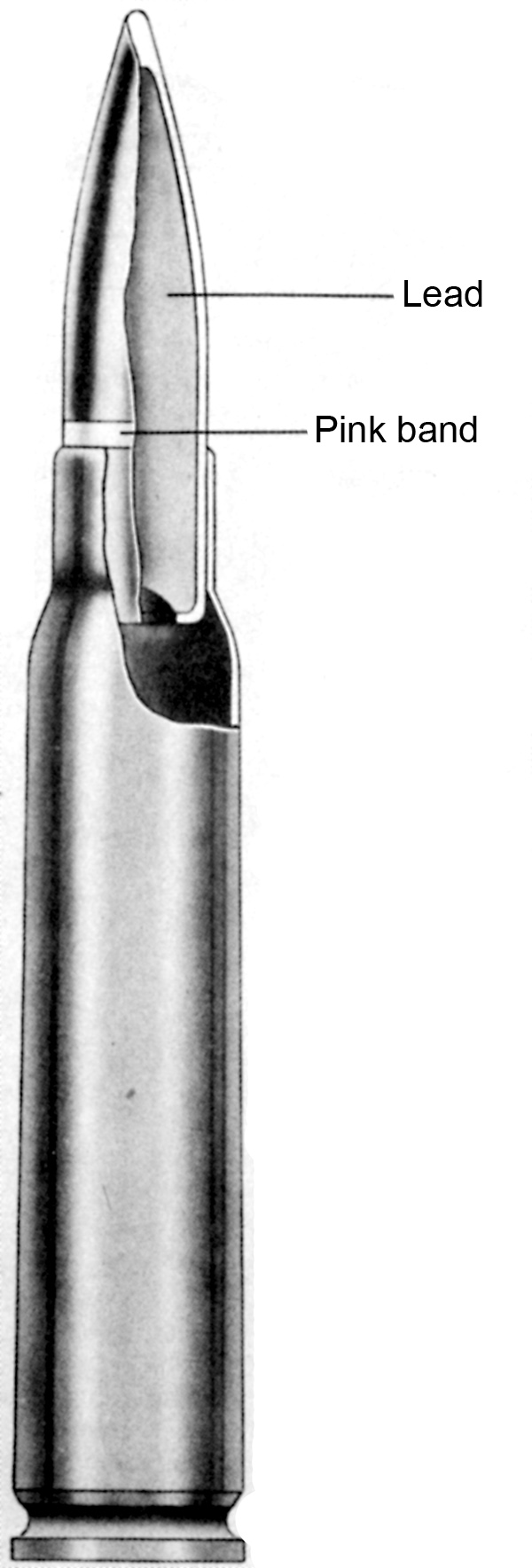
A cutaway of the round

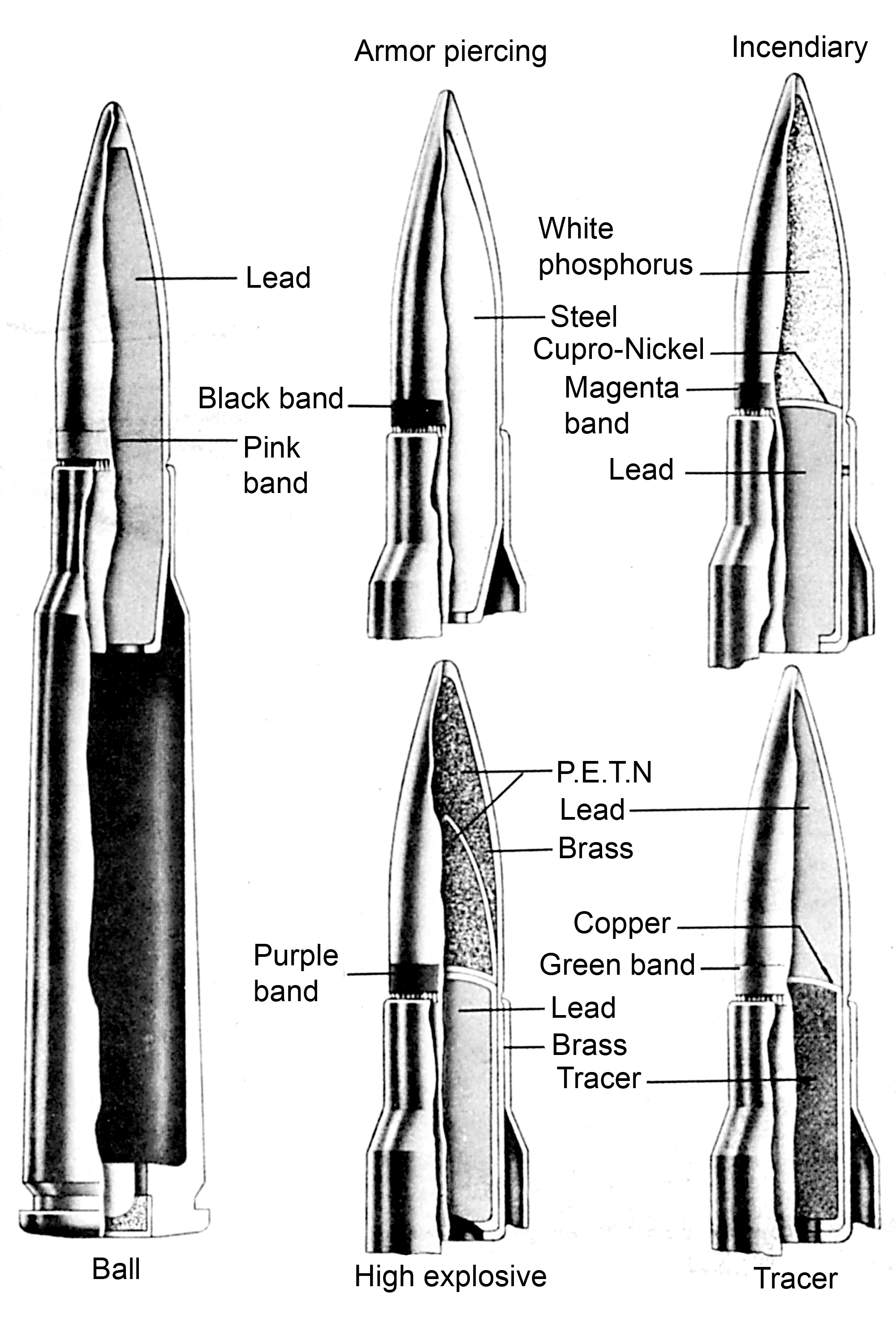
Type 92 7.7x58mmSR ammunition

== See also ==
- List of rifle cartridges
- 7 mm caliber—Other 7mm cartridges
- Table of handgun and rifle cartridges
