= Chautauqua Prize =

American literary award

- Date: Annual
- Country: United States
- Presented by: Chautauqua Institution
- First award: 2012
- Website: www.ciweb.org/prize

The Chautauqua Prize is an annual American literary award established by the Chautauqua Institution in 2012. The winner receives US$7,500 and all travel and expenses for a one-week summer residency at Chautauqua. It is a "national prize that celebrates a book of fiction or literary/narrative nonfiction that provides a richly rewarding reading experience and honors the author for a significant contribution to the literary arts."

== Honorees ==
Chautauqua Prize winners and shortlist
Year	Author	Title	Result	Ref.
2012	Andrew Krivak	The Sojourn	Winner	
2012	Geraldine Brooks	Caleb's Crossing	Shortlist	
2012	Erik Larson	In the Garden of Beasts	Shortlist	
2012	Nathaniel Philbrick	Why Read Moby-Dick?	Shortlist	
2012	Stephanie Powell Watts	We Are Taking Only What We Need	Shortlist	
2012	Leonard Rosen	All Cry Chaos	Shortlist	
2013	Timothy Egan	Short Nights of the Shadow Catcher	Winner	
2013	Nancy Gibbs and Michael Duffy	The Presidents Club	Shortlist	
2013	Ben Fountain	Billy Lynn's Long Halftime Walk	Winner	
2013	Gilbert King	Devil in the Grove	Shortlist	
2013	Madeline Miller	The Song of Achilles	Shortlist	
2013	John Colman Wood	The Names of Things	Shortlist	
2014	Elizabeth Scarboro	My Foreign Cities	Winner	
2014	Louise Aronson	A History of the Present Illness: Stories	Shortlist	
2014	Lindsay Hill	Sea of Hooks	Shortlist	
2014	Roger Rosenblatt	The Boy Detective: A New York Childhood	Shortlist	
2014	James Tobin	The Man He Became: How FDR Defied Polio to Win the Presidency	Shortlist	
2014	Margaret Wrinkle	Wash	Shortlist	
2015	Phil Klay	Redeployment	Winner	
2015	Michael Blanding	The Map Thief	Shortlist	
2015	Kim Church	Byrd	Shortlist	
2015	Brian Hart	The Bully of Order	Shortlist	
2015	Lily King	Euphoria	Shortlist	
2015	Jason Sokol	All Eyes Are Upon Us	Shortlist	
2015	Bilal Tanweer	The Scatter Here Is Too Great	Shortlist	
2015	Jean Thompson	The Witch	Shortlist	
2016	Cyrus Copeland	Off the Radar: A Father's Secret, a Mother's Heroism, and a Son's Quest	Winner	
2016	Lynsey Addario	It's What I Do: A Photographer's Life of Love and War	Shortlist	
2016	Lenore Myka	King of the Gypsies: Stories	Shortlist	
2016	Steven Niteingale	Granada: A Pomegranate in the Hand of God	Shortlist	
2016	Susan Southard	Nagasaki: Life After Nuclear War	Shortlist	
2017	Peter Ho Davies	The Fortunes	Winner	
2017	H. W. Brands	The General vs. The President: MacArthur and Truman at the Brink of Nuclear War	Shortlist	
2017	Victoria Pope Hubbell	Blood River Rising: The Thompson-Crimson Feud of the 1920s	Shortlist	
2017	Ben Winters	Underground Airlines	Shortlist	
2017	Colin Woodard	American Character: A History of the Epic Struggle Between Individual Liberty and the Common Good	Shortlist	
2017	Kao Kalia Yang	The Song Poet: A Memoir of My Father	Shortlist	
2018	Alex Marzano-Lesnevich	The Fact of a Body: A Murder and a Memoir	Winner	
2018	Hala Alyan	Salt Houses	Shortlist	
2018	Glenn Frankel	High Noon: The Hollywood Blacklist and the Making of an American Classic	Shortlist	
2018	Anne Gisleson	The Futilitarians: Our Year of Thinking, Drinking, Grieving, and Reading	Shortlist	
2018	Meg Howrey	The Wanderers	Shortlist	
2018	Andrew Krivák	The Signal Flame	Shortlist	
2018	Dalia Rosenfeld	The Worlds We Think We Know	Shortlist	
2019	Anjali Sachdeva	All the Names They Used For God	Winner	
2019	Edward Carey	Little	Shortlist	
2019	Ken Krimstein	The Three Escapes of Hannah Arendt: A Tyranny of Truth	Shortlist	
2019	Kiese Laymon	Heavy: An American Memoir	Shortlist	
2019	Richard Powers	The Overstory	Shortlist	
2019	Elizabeth Rush	Rising: Dispatches from the New American Shore	Shortlist	
2019	Elizabeth H. Winthrop	The Mercy Seat	Shortlist	
2020	Petina Gappah	Out of Darkness, Shining Light	Winner	
2020	Mikhal Dekel	Tehran Children: A Holocaust Refugee Odyssey	Shortlist	
2020	Carolyn Forché	What You Have Heard is True: A Memoir of Witness and Resistance	Shortlist	
2020	Myla Goldberg	Feast Your Eyes	Shortlist	
2020	Isabella Hammad	The Parisian	Shortlist	
2020	Imani Perry	Breathe: A Letter to My Sons	Shortlist	
2020	Pitchaya Sudbanthad	Bangkok Wakes to Rain	Shortlist	
2021	Eula Biss	Having and Being Had	Winner	
2021	Louise Erdrich	The Night Watchman	Shortlist	
2021	Danielle Evans	The Office of Historical Corrections	Shortlist	
2021	Yaa Gyasi	Transcendent Kingdom	Shortlist	
2021	Andrew Krivak	The Bear	Shortlist	
2021	Natasha Trethewey	Memorial Drive: A Daughter's Memoir	Shortlist	
2021	Matthew Van Meter	Deep Delta Justice: A Black Teen: His Lawyer, and Their Groundbreaking Battle for Civil Rights in the South	Shortlist	
2021	C Pam Zhang	How Much of These Hills is Gold	Shortlist	
2022	Rebecca Donner	All The Frequent Troubles Of Our Days: The True Story of the American Woman at the Heart of the German Resistance to Hitler	Winner	
2022	Daniel James Brown	Facing the Mountain: A True Story of Japanese American Heroes in World War II	Shortlist	
2022	Victoria Chang	Dear Memory: Letters on Writing, Silence, and Grief	Shortlist	
2022	Ash Davidson	Damnation Spring	Shortlist	
2022	Robert Jones, Jr.	The Prophets	Shortlist	
2022	Tiya Miles	All That She Carried: The Journey of Ashley's Sack, a Black Family Keepsake	Shortlist	
2022	Jason Mott	Hell of a Book	Shortlist	
2022	Samantha Silva	Love and Fury: A Novel of Mary Wollstonecraft	Shortlist	
2022	Dorothy Wickenden	The Agitators: Three Friends Who Fought for Abolition and Women's Rights	Shortlist	
2022	Hilma Wolitzer	Today a Woman Went Mad at the Supermarket: Stories	Shortlist	
2023	Siddhartha Mukherjee	The Song of the Cell: An Exploration of Medicine and the New Human	Winner	
2023	Hafizah Augustus Geter	The Black Period: On Personhood, Race, and Origin	Shortlist	
2023	Levi Vonk with Axel Kirschner	Border Hacker: A Tale of Treachery, Trafficking, and Two Friends on the Run	Shortlist	
2023	Meron Hadero	A Down Home Meal for These Difficult Times: Stories	Shortlist	
2023	Jenny Tinghui Zhang	Four Treasures of the Sky	Shortlist	
2023	Geraldine Brooks	Horse	Shortlist	
2023	Jean Hanff Korelitz	The Latecomer	Shortlist	
2023	Kristina Gorcheva-Newberry	The Orchard	Shortlist	
2023	Javier Zamora	Solito: A Memoir	Shortlist	
2023	Sidik Fofana	Stories from the Tenants Downstairs	Shortlist	
2024	Tananarive Due	The Reformatory	Winner	
2024	Nana Kwame Adjei-Brenyah	Chain-Gang All-Stars	Shortlist	
2024	Isabella Hammad	Enter Ghost	Shortlist	
2024	Paul Harding	This Other Eden	Shortlist	
2024	Kelly Link	White Cat, Black Dog: Stories	Shortlist	
2024	Emily Strasser	Half-Life of a Secret: Reckoning with a Hidden History	Shortlist	
