= Enter Ghost =

2024 novel by Isabella Hammad

- Author: Isabella Hammad
- Publisher: Random House
- Publication date: 4 April 2023
- Pages: 323
- ISBN: 9-781-52991999-8
- Dewey Decimal: 823.92

Enter Ghost is a 2023 novel by Isabella Hammad. It was the winner of the 2024 RSL Encore Award and shortlisted for the 2024 Women's Prize for Fiction amongst other awards. It has been reviewed by the New York Times and The Guardian.

The title, "Enter Ghost," refers to a stage direction from Shakespeare's Hamlet; the novel takes place during a 2017 production of the play in the West Bank. The book explores themes of homecoming and hauntings, as well as Palestinian and Arabic theatre traditions.

== Plot ==
Sonia is a British-Palestinian actress living in London, who has recently ended an affair with a theatre director. In an attempt to escape the theatre world and her former lover, Sonia takes an extended trip to Haifa to visit her sister Haneen, who teaches at an Israeli university. While she grew up visiting her grandparents and cousins as a child, Sonia has not been back to the region since the Second Intifada.

Despite claims that she is visiting Palestine to escape her life in London and visit Haneen, Sonia finds herself restless and haunted by family dynamics. She discovers that her grandparents' home in Haifa was sold to an Israeli family, and Haneen struggle to connect. Sonia reflects on her experience being brought to the bedside of a Palestinian hunger striker when she was young; this experience was formative for both sisters.

Sonia meets Haneen's friend Mariam, a theatre director currently preparing a production of Hamlet. Mariam asks Sonia to read for the parts of Ophelia and Gertrude while they try to find actresses to fill the roles. Hamlet is to be played by a young Palestinian pop star named Wael, whose fame attract more attention toward the production. Mariam's brother, Salim, is a member of the Knesset, has been helping to fund the production, which invites attention from the Israeli intelligence.

The actors discuss the play as an allegory for the Palestinian cause; at one point Mariam encourages Wael to access Hamlet's dark side by portraying him as an Israeli soldier at a checkpoint. Initially, Sonia is dismissive of this interpretation, but she finds more connections between the play and the struggle of Palestinian liberation as she continues working with the cast.

== Reception ==
Kirkus Reviews (starred review) called the book "A thorough and thoughtful exploration of the role of art in the political arena..."

Publishers Weekly (starred review) called it "soul-stirring" and said "The layered text, rich in languages and literary references, dives deep into Sonia’s consciousness, illustrating her hopes for what art can accomplish. This deeply human work will stay with readers."

Year	Award	Result	Ref.
2023	The Bridge Book Award	Won	
2024	Aspen Words Literary Prize	Won	
2024	Chautauqua Prize	Shortlisted	
2024	Gordon Bowker Volcano Prize	Shortlisted	
2024	Royal Society of Literature Encore Award	Won	
2024	William Saroyan International Prize for Writing	Shortlisted	
2024	Women's Prize for Fiction	Shortlisted	
2025	Clark Fiction Prize	Won	
