= Krag–Jørgensen =

Norwegian bolt-action rifle

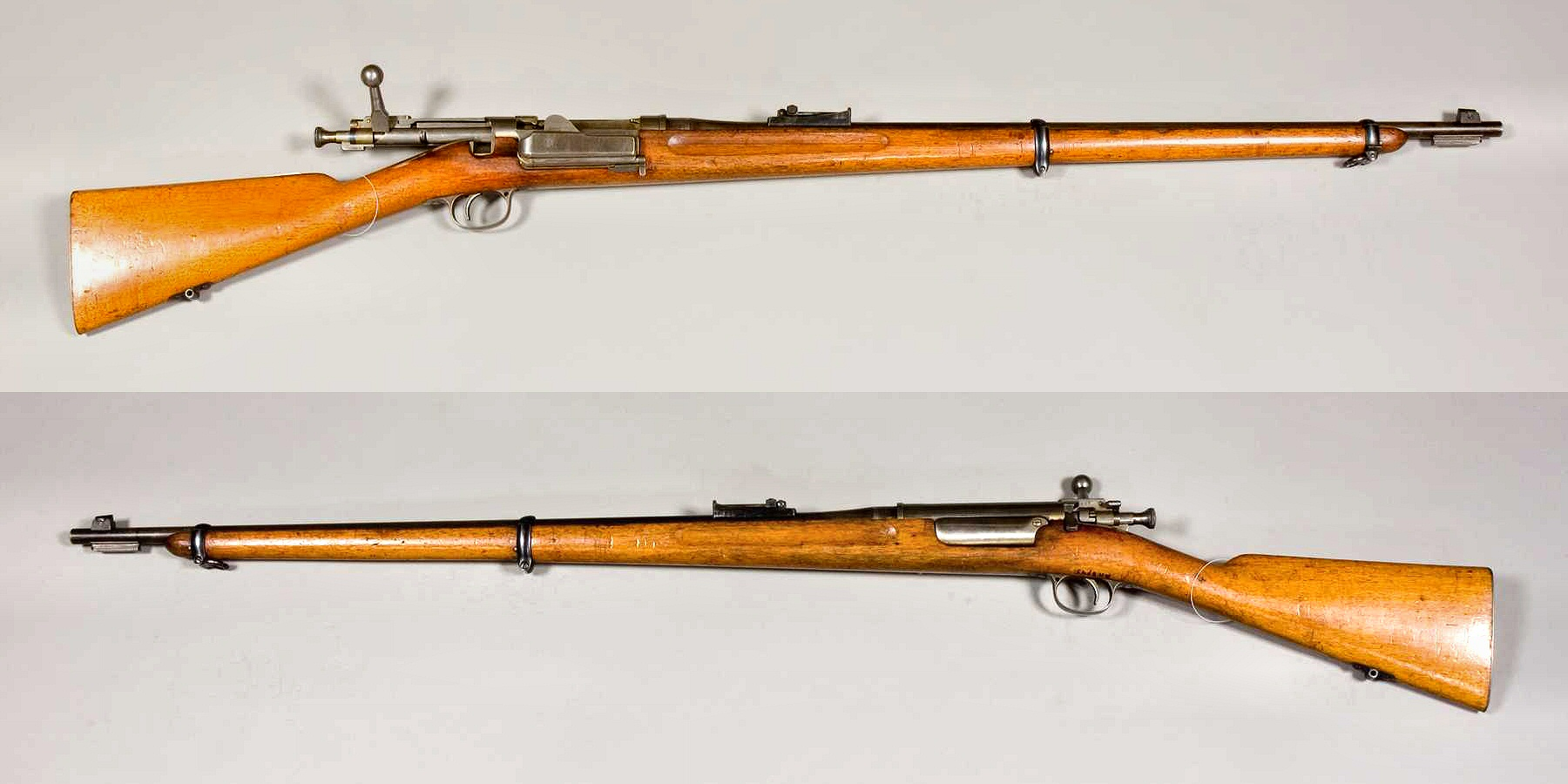
- Krag–Jørgensen, Norway. Prototype m/1892
- Type: Bolt-action rifle
- Place of origin: Norway

Service history
- In service: 1889–1945

Production history
- Designer: Ole Herman Johannes Krag and Erik Jørgensen
- Designed: 1885–1889
- Manufacturer: Kongsberg Våpenfabrikk
- Produced: 1886–1945
- No. built: +748,500
- Variants: Danish Krags: Rifle 1889; Carbine 1889; Sniper rifle 1928; US Krags: M1892 rifle; M1892 carbine; M1896 rifle; M1896 cadet rifle; M1896 carbine; M1898 rifle; M1898 carbine; M1899 carbine; M1899 constable carbine; Norwegian Krags: M1894 rifle; M1895 carbine; M1897 carbine; M1904 carbine; M1907 carbine; M1906 boy's carbine; M1912 short rifle; M1923 sniper rifle; M1925 sniper rifle; M1930 sniper rifle

Specifications
- Mass: 3.375 kg / 7.5 lb to 5.157 kg / 11.46 lb depending on model
- Length: 986 mm / 38.8 in to 1328 mm / 52.28 in depending on model
- Barrel length: 520 mm / 20.5 in to 832 mm / 32.78 in depending on model
- Cartridge: .30-40 Krag; 6.5×55mm; 8×58mmR Danish Krag
- Action: Bolt action
- Rate of fire: 21.5-30/RPM by skilled user
- Muzzle velocity: 580 m/s (1900 ft/s) to 870 m/s (2860ft/s) depending on ammunition
- Effective firing range: 900 m (980 yd)
- Feed system: 5-round magazine +1 in chamber
- Sights: V-notch and front post

The Krag–Jørgensen is a repeating bolt-action rifle designed by the Norwegians Ole Herman Johannes Krag and Erik Jørgensen in the late 19th century. It was adopted as a standard arm by Norway, Denmark, and the United States. About 300 were delivered to Boer forces of the South African Republic.

A distinctive feature of the Krag–Jørgensen action is its magazine. While many other rifles of its era use an integral box magazine loaded by a charger or stripper clip, the magazine of the Krag–Jørgensen is integral with the receiver (the part of the rifle that houses the operating parts), featuring an opening on the right hand side with a hinged cover. Instead of a charger, single cartridges are inserted through the side opening, and are pushed up, around, and into the action by a spring follower. Later, similar to a charger, a claw type clip would be made for the Krag that allowed the magazine to be loaded all at once, also known as the Krag "speedloader magazine".

The design presents both advantages and disadvantages compared with a top-loading "box" magazine. Normal loading was one cartridge at a time, and this could be done more easily with a Krag than a rifle with a "box" magazine. In fact, several cartridges can be dumped into the opened magazine of a Krag at once with no need for careful placement, and when shutting the magazine-door the cartridges are forced to line up correctly inside the magazine. The design was also easy to "top off", and unlike most top-loading magazines, the Krag–Jørgensen's magazine could be topped up without opening the rifle's bolt. The Krag–Jørgensen is a popular rifle among collectors, and is valued by shooters for its smooth action.

== Early development ==
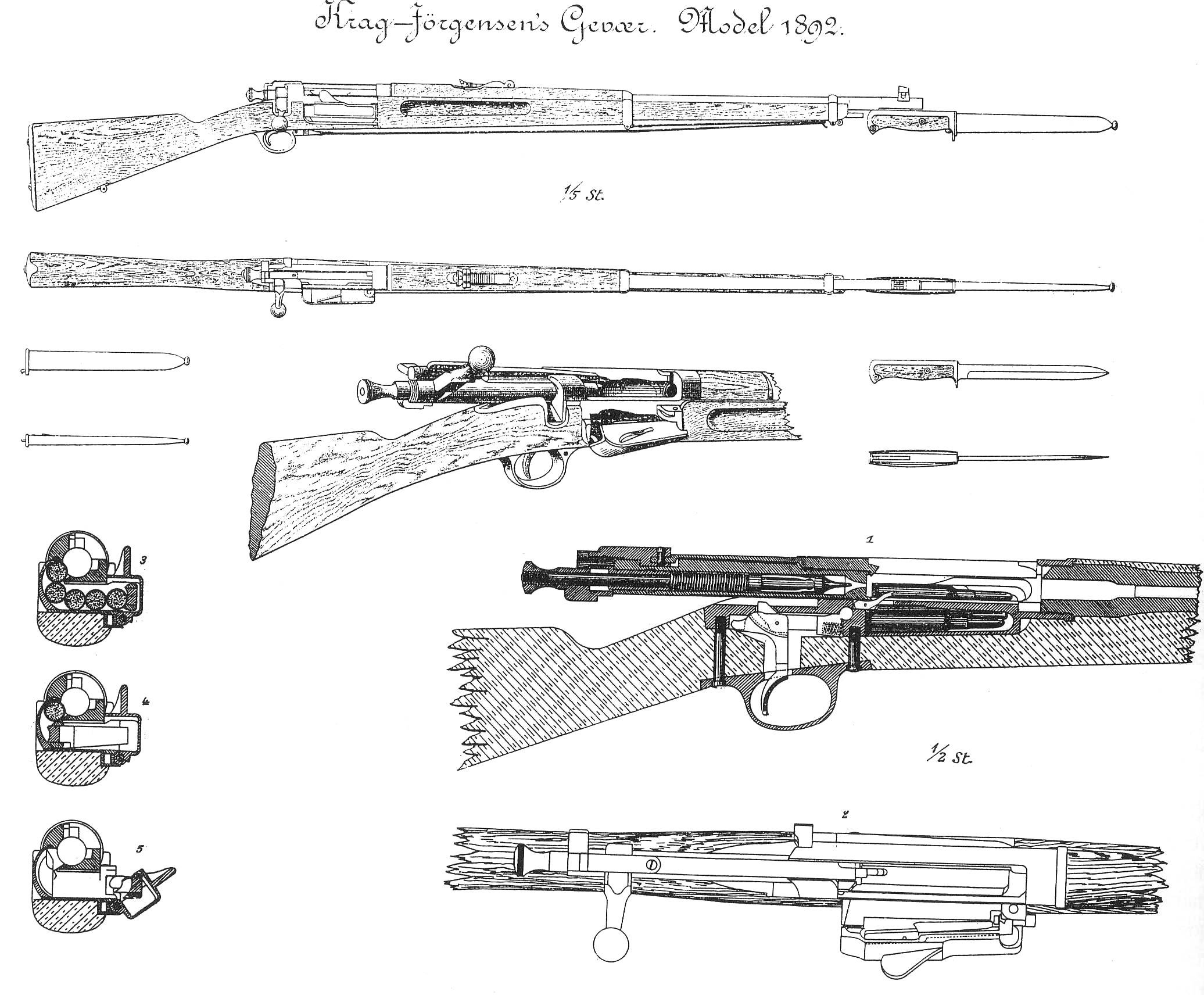
Technical drawing of an early Krag–Jørgensen

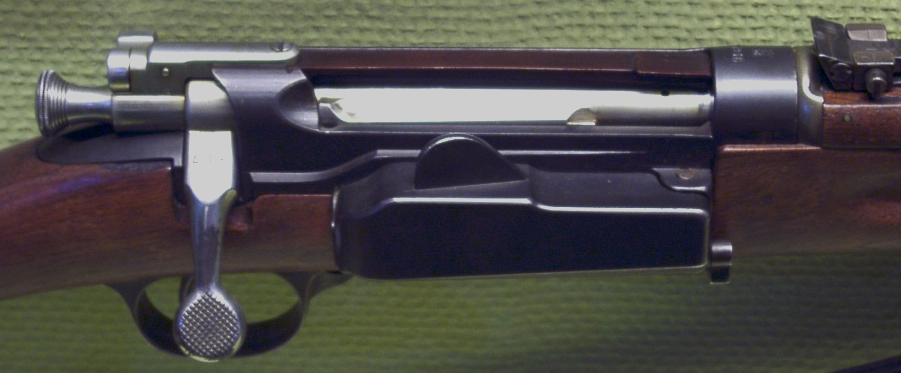
Closeup of the Krag–Jørgensen receiver and magazine door on a Norwegian M1912 carbine

The 1880s were the decade where smokeless powder came into general use, and the calibre of various service rifles diminished as new small-bore, high-velocity cartridges using smokeless propellant were developed. Many nations adopted repeating bolt-action rifles using such cartridges during this decade.

Even though Norway had adopted the repeating Jarmann rifle in 1884, it was soon clear that it was at best an interim weapon. Ole Krag, captain in the Norwegian Army and director of Kongsberg Våpenfabrikk (the government weapons factory), therefore continued the development of small arms, as he had since at least 1866. Not satisfied with the tubular magazine of the Jarmann rifle and his earlier Krag–Petersson rifle (adopted by the Royal Norwegian Navy in 1876), he enlisted the help of master gunsmith Erik Jørgensen. Together, they developed the capsule magazine. The principal feature of the capsule magazine was that instead of being a straight box protruding below the stock of the rifle, it wrapped around the bolt action. Early models contained ten rounds and were fitted to modified versions of the Jarmann—though they could be adapted to any bolt-action rifle.

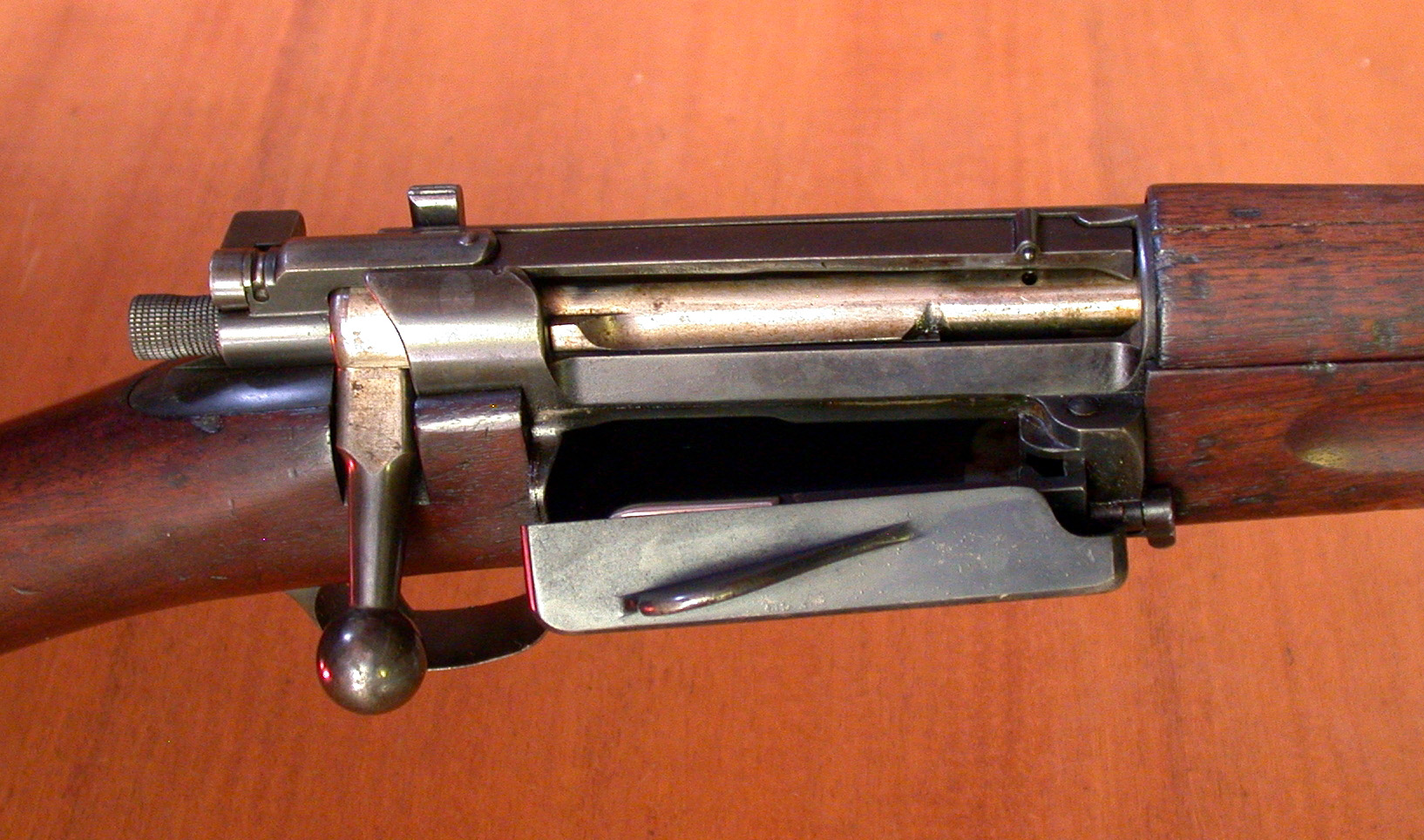
Close-up of an open American 1898 Springfield Krag magazine loading gate

In 1886, Denmark was on the verge of adopting a new rifle for its armed forces. One of the early prototypes of the new rifle was sent to Denmark. The feedback given by the Danes was vital in the further development of the weapon. The test performed in Denmark revealed the need to lighten the rifle, as well as the possible benefits of a completely new action. Krag and Jørgensen therefore decided to convert the magazine into what they referred to as a half-capsule, containing only five rounds of ammunition instead of the previous ten. They also, over the next several months, combined what they considered the best ideas from other gunsmiths with a number of their own ideas to design a distinct bolt action for their rifle. The long extractor, situated on top of the bolt, was inspired by the Jarmann mechanism, while the use of curved surfaces for cocking and ejecting the spent round was probably inspired by the designs from Mauser. For a time after the weapon was adopted by Denmark they experimented with dual frontal locking lugs, but decided against it on grounds of cost and weight. The ammunition of the day did not need dual frontal locking lugs, and the bolt already had three lugs—one in front, one just in front of the bolt handle, and the bolt handle itself—which were considered more than strong enough.

The rifle had a feature known as a magazine cut-off. This is a switch on the left rear of the receiver. When flipped up (on the Norwegian Krag-J rifles and carbines), the cut-off does not allow cartridges in the internal magazine to be fed into the chamber by the advancing bolt. This was intended to be used for when soldiers were comfortably firing at distant targets. After each shot, the soldier would take a round out of his pouch and load it directly into the chamber as if he was using single-shot rifle. The rounds in the magazine are thus held in reserve. If the enemy suddenly charged or the soldier was ordered to charge, the soldier could then retract the cut-off for up to five rounds of rapid shooting. The M1903 Springfield that replaced the Krags had a magazine cutoff, as did the SMLE (Lee–Enfield) until 1915.

== Danish Krag–Jørgensen rifles ==
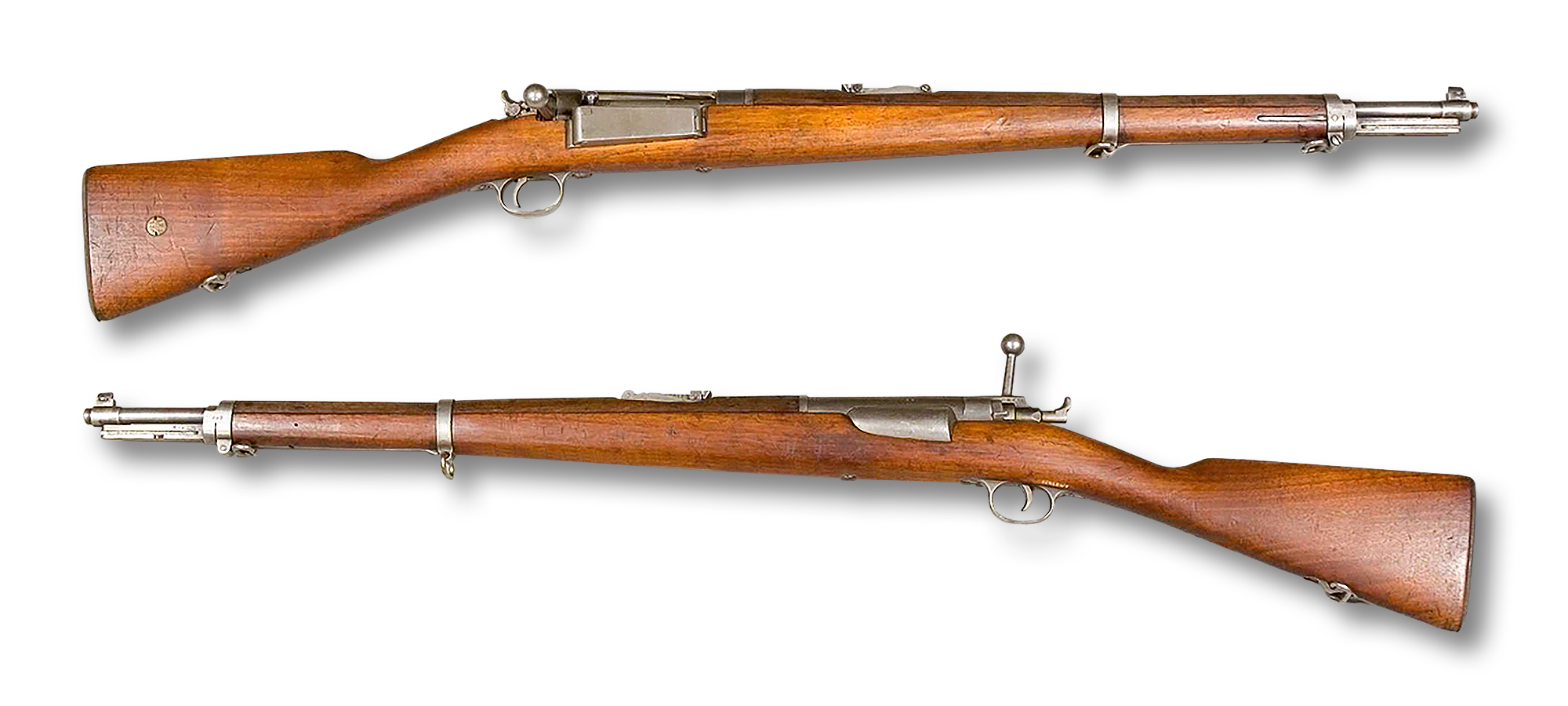
Danish M1889 Krag–Jørgensen carbines (8×58 mmR), from the collections of the Swedish Army Museum, Stockholm.

After strenuous tests, Denmark adopted the Krag–Jørgensen rifle on July 3, 1889. The Danish rifle differed in several key areas from the weapons later adopted by the United States and Norway, particularly in its use of a forward (as opposed to downward) hinged magazine door, the use of rimmed ammunition, and the use of an outer steel liner for the barrel.

The Danish Krag–Jørgensen was chambered for the 8×58R cartridge (0.31 in / 7.87 mm), and was at least in the early years used as a single shooter with the magazine in reserve. It stayed in service right up to the German invasion of Denmark on April 9, 1940. Danish Krags were given the German identification code Scharfschützen-Gewehr 312(d).

=== Subtypes of the Danish Krag–Jørgensen ===
While information on the various subtypes of the Krag–Jørgensen used in Denmark has proven difficult to find, at least the following subtypes were manufactured:

- Rifle M/89 (Gevær M/89), stocked almost to the muzzle, no hand guard, straight bolt handle and an outer steel liner for the barrel. This weapon is typical of the period in having a long barrel and stock without pistol grip. Was originally issued without a safety catch; instead, a half-cock notch on the cocking piece/firing pin assembly served this purpose. In 1910, this weapon was modified by the addition of a manual safety, which was placed on the right side of the receiver just behind the closed bolt handle.
- Cavalry carbine M/89 (Rytterkarabin M/89) and engineer carbine M/89 (Ingeniørkarabin M/89), wooden hand guard, shorter than the other carbines. The two designs differed only in placement of the barrel bands and the cavalry carbine's lack of a bayonet lug. The cavalry carbine M/89-23 (Rytterkarabin M/89-23) design added a bayonet lug.
- Artillery carbine M/89-24 (Artillerikarabin M/89) and infantry carbine M/89-24 (Fodfolkskarabin M/89-24), differed only in placement of the sling-swivel, and look like short versions of the rifle M/89.
- Sniper rifle M/89-28 (Finskydningsgevær M/89-28), an alteration of the rifle M/89 with a heavier barrel and a wooden hand guard, micrometer rear sight and hooded front sight.

== American Krag–Jørgensen rifles ==
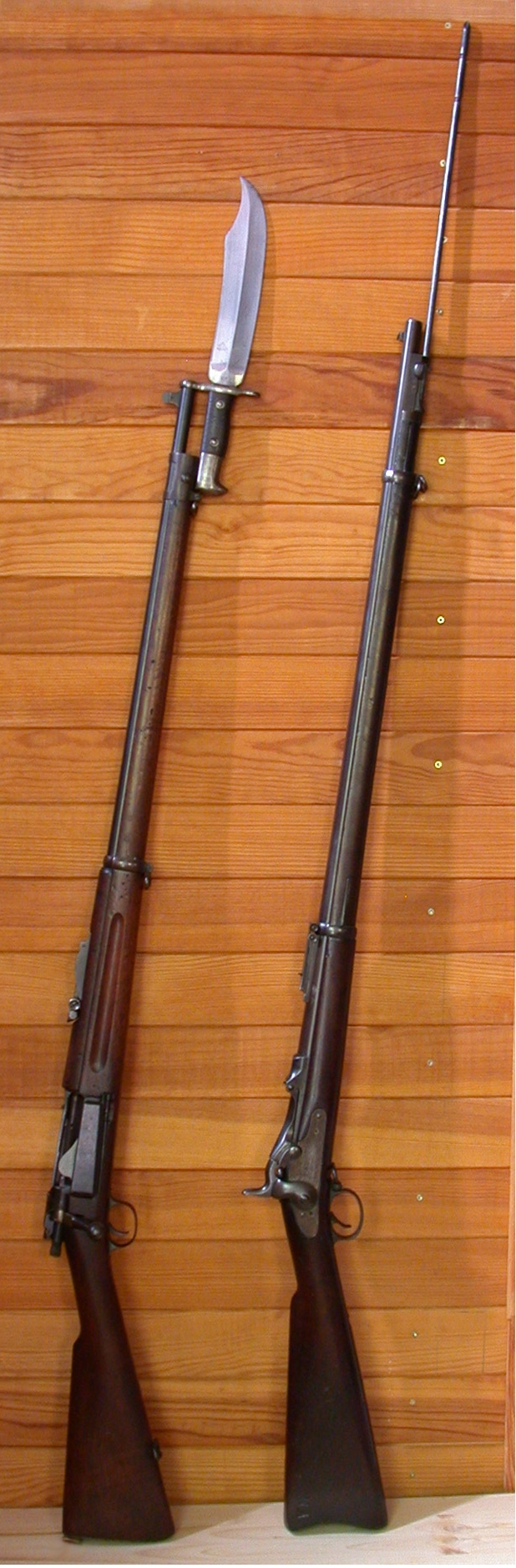
Two rifles side by side: an American Springfield M1898 Krag–Jørgensen on the left and a Springfield Model 1888 on the right.

Just like many other armed forces, the United States Military was searching for a new rifle in the early 1890s. A competition was held in 1892, comparing 53 rifle designs including Lee, Krag, Mannlicher, Mauser, and Schmidt–Rubin. The trials were held at Governors Island, New York, and the finalists were all foreign manufacturers—the Krag, the Lee, and the Mauser. The contract was awarded to the Krag design in August 1892, with initial production deferred as the result of protests from domestic inventors and arms manufacturers. Two rifle designers, Russell and Livermore, even sued the US government over the initial selection of the Krag, forcing a review of the testing results in April and May 1893. In spite of this, an improved form of the Krag–Jørgensen was again selected, and was awarded the contract. The primary reason for the selection of the Krag appears to have been its magazine design, which could be topped off as needed without raising and retracting the bolt (thus putting the rifle temporarily out of action). Ordnance officials also believed the Krag's magazine cutoff and lower reloading speed to be an advantage, one which conserved ammunition on the battlefield. This magazine design would later resurface as a distinct disadvantage once U.S. soldiers encountered Spanish troops armed with the charger-loaded 1893 7mm Spanish Mauser in the Spanish–American War.

Around 500,000 "Krags" in .30 Army (.30-40) calibre were produced at the Springfield Armory in Massachusetts from 1894 to 1904. The Krag–Jørgensen rifle in .30 Army found use in the Boxer Rebellion, the Spanish–American War, and the Philippine–American War. A few carbines were used by United States cavalry units fighting Apaches in New Mexico Territory and preventing poaching in Yellowstone National Park. Two-thousand rifles were taken to France by the United States Army 10th–19th engineers (railway) during World War I; but there is no evidence of use by front-line combat units during that conflict.

The US 'Krags' were chambered for the rimmed "cartridge, caliber 30, U.S. Army", round, also known as the .30 U.S., .30 Army, or .30 Government, and, more popularly, by its civilian name, the .30-40 Krag. The .30 Army was the first smokeless powder round adopted by the U.S. military, but its civilian name retained the "caliber-charge" designation of earlier black powder cartridges. Thus the .30-40 Krag employs a round-nose 220-grain (14 g) cupro-nickel jacketed .30 caliber (7.62 mm) bullet propelled by 40 grains (3 g) of smokeless powder to a muzzle velocity of approximately 2000 feet (600 m) per second. As with the .30-30 Winchester, it is the use of black powder nomenclature that leads to the incorrect assumption that the .30-40 Krag was once a black powder cartridge.

In U.S. service, the Krag eventually proved uncompetitive with Mauser-derived designs, most notably in combat operations in Cuba and the Philippines during the Spanish–American War. It served as the U.S. military's primary rifle for only 12 years, when it was replaced by the M1903 Springfield rifle in 1906 and many units did not receive it until 1908 and later. Surplused Krags were given to the US Navy where they remained in second line service (to arm shore parties, boarding parties, and the like or stored in crates in the holds of older ships) well into the 1930s. US Marines were still using Krags in Nicaragua in the late 1920s.

=== Subtypes of the Krag–Jørgensen used in the United States ===
There were at least nine different models of the American Krag–Jørgensen:

- M1892 rifle, is 49 inches (1,200 mm) in overall length weighing 9.3 pounds with a 30-inch (760 mm) barrel and a magazine cut off that operates in the up position. It can be identified by the cleaning rod under the barrel. Because it took two years to retool for production, Model 1892 Krags have receivers dated "1894." Most of the M1892 rifles were arsenal reconditioned to the Model 1896 configuration.
- M1892 carbine, presumably a prototype, as just two are known today. Looks like the M1892 rifle, but with a 22-inch barrel, including the long stock, and one-piece cleaning rod.
- M1896 rifle, where the magazine cut-off operates in down position and a three-piece cleaning rod is stored in a butt trap. An improved rear sight and tighter production tolerances gave better accuracy. Stock altered slightly (made thicker). This model figures prominently in the first part of Andrew Krivak's novel, The Sojourn.
- M1896 cadet rifle, which was fitted with cleaning rod like M1892 rifle. Only about 400 were made before it was discontinued. The cadet rifle did not have sling swivels, and the lower band was retained by a band spring.
- M1896 carbine, with the same modifications as the M1896 rifle.
- M1898 rifle, generally much like M1896, but with a wide range of minor changes, including reconfiguring the bolt handle recess to simplify receiver manufacture, reversing the operation of the magazine cut-off lever, and (beginning in 1901) providing windage adjustment on the rear sight.
- M1898 carbine, same minor modifications as the M1898 Rifle. Only 5000 made, originally had the same short stock (rear sight touches band) as the Model 1896 carbine; most were restocked as Model 1899s.
- M1899 carbine, generally the same as the M1898 carbine, but with a slightly longer forearm and hand guard, and without the swivel ring. Most of the M1898 carbines were arsenal reconditioned to the Model 1899 configuration and fitted with windage-adjustable rear sights.
- M1899 constabulary carbine, built for use in the Philippines. Basically a M1899 carbine fitted with a full-length stock and a bayonet lug, and the muzzle stepped down to accept bayonet.

A few prototype Model 1898 sniper rifles were assembled with Cataract telescopic sights for limited testing. In 1901, 100 Model 1898 rifles, and 100 Model 1899 carbines were fitted with a Parkhurst clip loading attachment to test use of Mauser-type stripper clips. In 1902, 100 rifles were made with 26 in (660 mm) barrels in an effort to develop one model acceptable to both infantry and cavalry. The so-called NRA carbines were rifles cut down to carbine length for sale to members of the National Rifle Association of America beginning in 1926 as a means of keeping skilled armoury workmen employed at Benicia Arsenal.

=== In the Caribbean and Latin America ===
In the early 20th century, the United States also distributed the Krag to some Caribbean countries in which US forces intervened. These included Haiti, where they equipped the Gendarmerie d'Haïti (newly founded in 1915) with surplus Krags. A 1919 letter to the Marine Commandant from the First Provisional Brigade in Port-au-Prince noted: "...[A]bout 2,000 bandits infest the hills... I don't believe that in all Haiti there are more than 400 to 500 rifles, if that many. They are very short of ammunition.. They use our ammunition and the Krag by tying a piece of goatskin on string around the base of the cartridge."

The 1916-1924 American occupation of the Dominican Republic resulted in a small flow of Krags to that country. The Guardia Nacional Dominicana issued the received Krag rifles, though the rifles broke down quickly when issued to unfamiliar Dominican troops, and spare parts were hard to obtain. The discovery of Krag bullets in victims' bodies in the 1937 Parsley massacre was taken by US observers as evidence of the government's involvement in the killings. At the start of World War II, the Dominican government had 1,860 Krags on-hand, supplementing their over 2,000 Spanish Mausers.

In Nicaragua, to support the government of Adolfo Díaz, the American government provided Krags to the newly formed Guardia Nacional in 1925. Selling them an additional 3,000 rifles in 1927. In 1961, Cuban militias were still fielding some Krag-Jørgensons during the Bay of Pigs invasion.

=== In Africa ===
In 1919, the United States provided discounted arms sales to the Liberians, giving them a number of Springfield Krag rifles, in addition to Peabody and Mauser rifles.

== Norwegian Krag–Jørgensen rifles ==
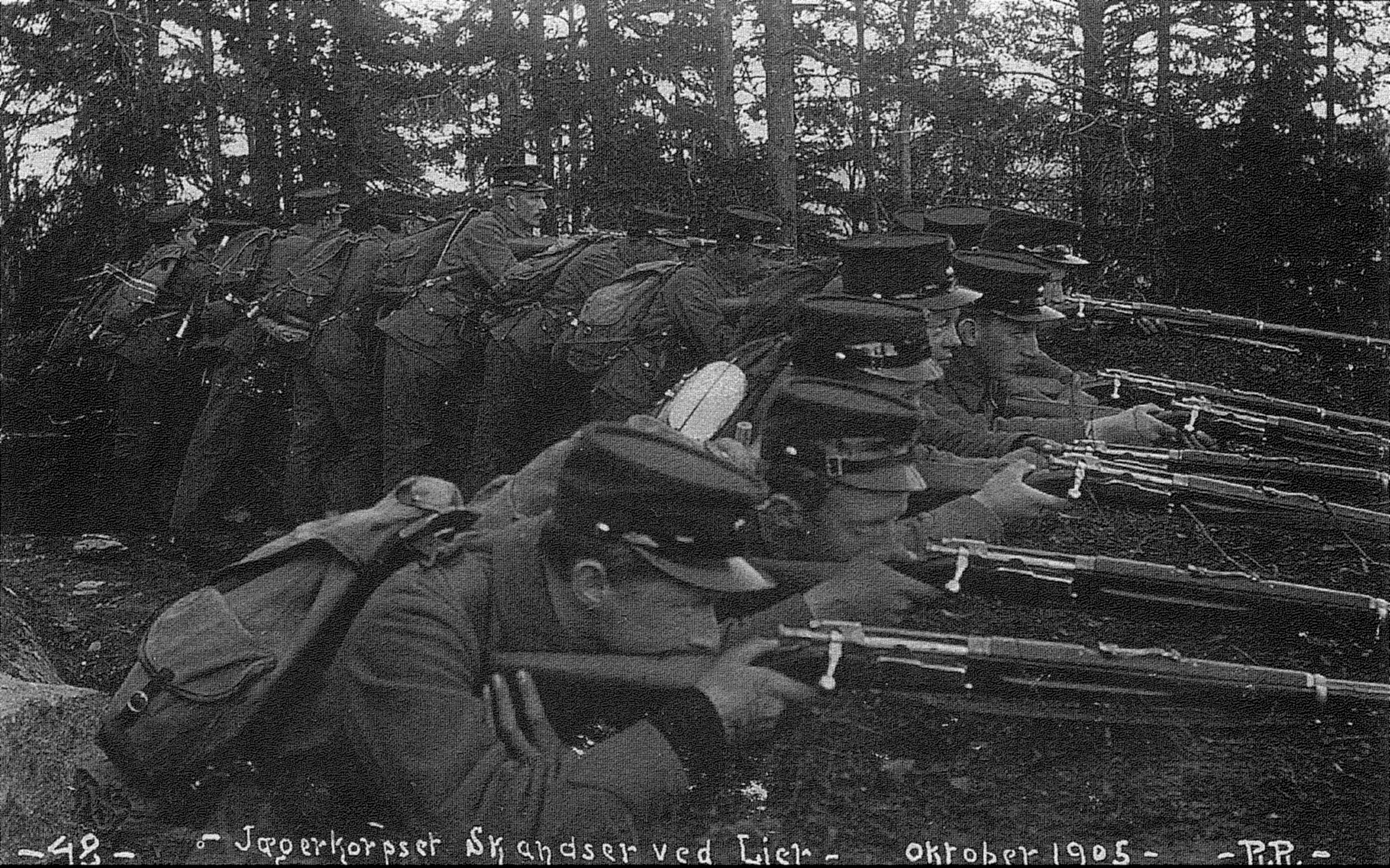
Norwegian soldiers in position at Kongsvinger in 1905, armed with Krag–Jørgensen rifles

The Swedish-Norwegian Rifle Commission started its work in 1891. One of their first tasks was to find the best possible calibre for the new weapon. After extensive ballistic tests where different calibres were tested (8 mm, 7.5 mm, 7 mm, 6.5 mm etc.), the optimal caliber was determined to be 6.5 mm (0.256 in). Following this decision, a joint Norwegian-Swedish commission was established in December 1893. This commission worked through a series of meetings to decide on the different measurements for the cartridge case. A rimless cartridge case of 55 mm length was approved, and each possible measurement (diameter at base, diameter at neck, angle of case, angle of shoulder etc.) was decided upon. The corresponding dimensions of the cartridge chamber to be used in a future service rifle was also determined. The cartridge became what is later known as 6.5×55mm. The round of ammunition is also known as 6.5×55 Krag, 6.5×55 Scan (Scandinavia), 6.5×55 Mauser, 6.5×55 Swedish, and 6.5×55 Nor (Norwegian), but they all referred to the same cartridge.

Some historians have assumed that there was a difference in cartridge blueprint measurements between Swedish and Norwegian 6.5×55mm ammunition, but this may be unintentional. Due to different interpretations of the blueprint standard, i.e. the standards of manufacturing using maximum chamber in the Krag vs. minimum chamber in the Swedish Mauser, a small percentage of the ammunition produced in Norway proved to be slightly oversize when chambered in the Swedish Mauser action, i.e. requiring a push on the bolt handle to chamber in the Swedish arm. A rumour arose not long after the 6.5×55mm cartridge was adopted that one could use Swedish ammunition in Norwegian rifles, but not Norwegian ammunition in Swedish rifles. Some even alleged that this incompatibility was deliberate, to give Norway the tactical advantage of using captured ammunition in a war, while denying the same advantage to the Swedes. However, after the rumour first surfaced in 1900, the issue was examined by the Swedish military. They declared the difference to be insignificant, and that both the Swedish and Norwegian ammunition was within the specified parameters laid down. Despite this finding, the Swedish weapon-historian Josef Alm repeated the rumour in a book in the 1930s, leading many to believe that there was a significant difference between the ammunition manufactured in Norway and Sweden. It is worth noting that Sweden would later adopt a 6.5×55mm rifle with a much stronger Mauser bolt action, the m/94 carbine in 1894 and the m/96 rifle in 1896, both of which were proof-tested with loads generating significantly more pressure than those used to proof the Norwegian Krag action.

Once the question of ammunition was settled, the Norwegians started looking at a modern arm to fire their newly designed cartridge. The processing was modelled on the US Army Ordnance selection process and considered, among other things, sharp-shooting at different ranges, shooting with defective or dirty ammunition, rapidity of shooting, conservation of ammunition, corrosion resistance, and ease of assembly and disassembly. After the test, three rifles were shortlisted:

- Mannlicher 1892
- Mauser 1892
- Krag–Jørgensen 1892

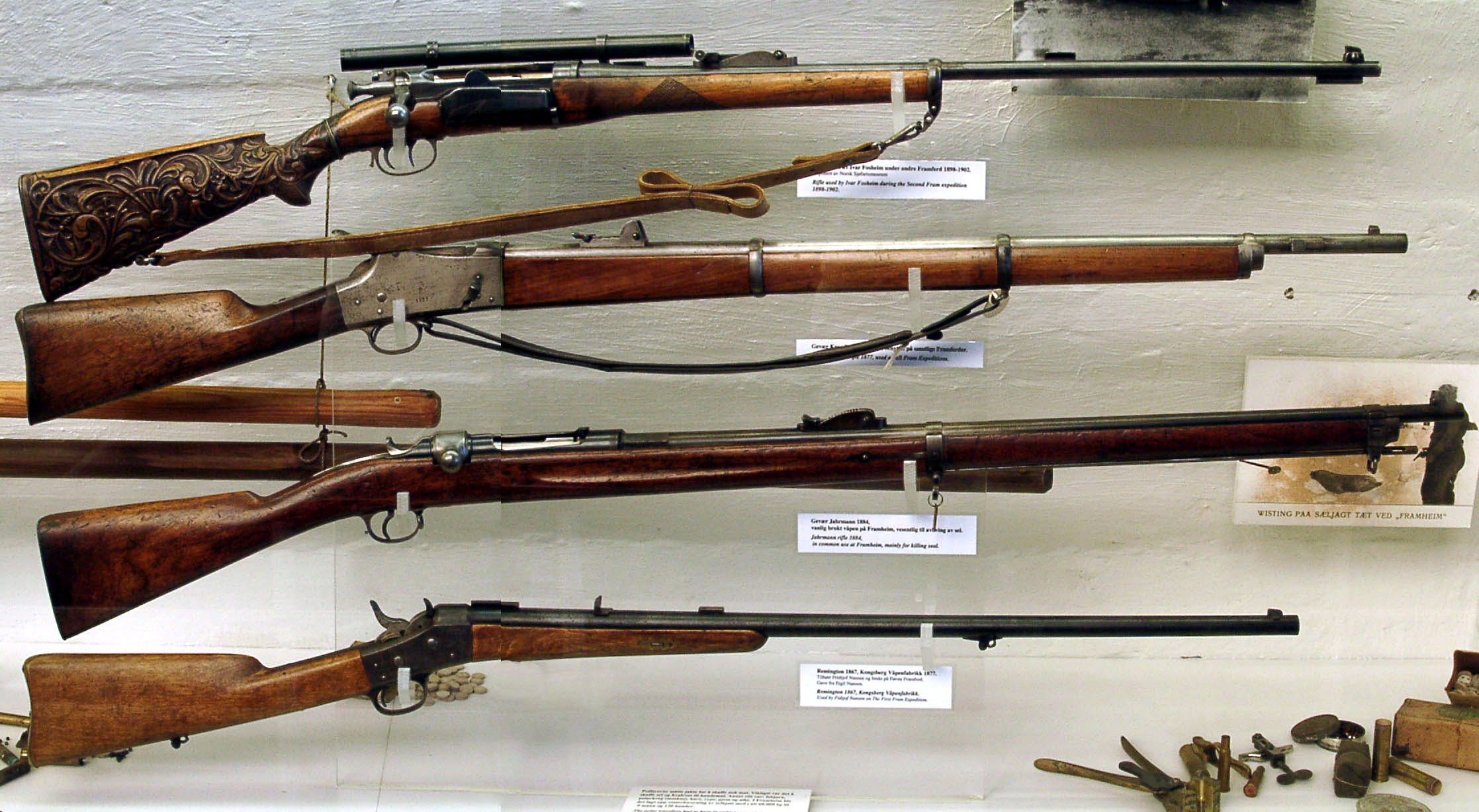
A collection of rifles on display at the Fram Museum, with a civilian Krag–Jørgensen M1894 featuring a carved stock shown on top.

About fifty Krag–Jørgensen rifles were produced in 1893 and issued to soldiers for field testing. The reports were good, and a few modifications were later incorporated into the design. For example, to prevent double feed manlfunctions, the extractor was redesigned to replace push feed with controlled feed, and sear leaf spring was replaced by a coil spring.

Despite the fact that both the Mannlicher and Mauser submissions were significantly faster to reload than the Krag, the latter, having been designed in Norway, was selected. As in the United States, rapidity of fire was deemed to be of lesser importance in an era when current military philosophy still emphasized precise aimed fire and conservation of ammunition. Instead, the magazine was looked upon as a reserve, to be used only when authorized by a commanding officer. The Krag–Jørgensen was formally adopted as the new rifle for the Norwegian Army on April 21, 1894.

A total of more than 215,000 Krag–Jørgensen rifles and carbines were built at the Kongsberg Arms Factory in Norway. 33,500 additional M/1894 rifles were produced at Steyr (Österreichische Waffenfabrik Gesellschaft) in 1896–1897 under contracts for the Norwegian Army (29,000 rifles) and the Civilian Marksmanship Organisation (4,500 rifles). The various subtypes of Krag–Jørgensen replaced all rifles and carbines previously used by the Norwegian armed forces, notably the Jarmann M1884, the Krag–Petersson and the last of the remaining Remington M1867 and modified kammerladers rimfire rifles and carbines.

=== Norwegian-style Krag rifles in Boer service ===
A number of 1896 and 1897 Steyr-manufactured Krag rifles resembling the M1894 Norwegian and chambered in 6.5×55, but lacking some Norwegian inspection markings and having serial numbers outside the sequences of those produced for Norway, were in Boer hands during the Second Boer War (1899–1902), most have serial numbers below 900. Markings show these rifles were manufactured by Steyr concurrently with a large order of M1894 rifles made for Norway. Some parts of rejected Norwegian rifles may have been used in these weapons—many small parts have serial numbers that do not match receiver numbers, these mismatched small parts sometimes have numbers in ranges of rifles made for Norway, yet appear original to the rifle. Photographs of high-ranking Boer officers holding M1894-like rifles exist. Cartridge casings in 6.5×55 have been found on the Magersfontein battlefield and may have been fired by such M1894-like rifles. Some sources state that about 100 1896-date and at least about 200 1897-date rifles reached the Boers. Some rifles meeting this description exist in South African museums with Boer-war documentation, and in England documented as captured bring-backs. A few rifles having Norwegian inspector stamps and serial numbers in the civilian marksmanship organization serial number range are also known to be in South African museums and may have been used by Boer forces—it is suspected that these may have arrived in South Africa with a small Scandinavian volunteer force that fought for the Boers. A small number of Steyr 1897 M1894-like 6.5×55 rifles with 3-digit serial numbers outside the Norwegian contract ranges and in the same range as these Boer Krags, and lacking Norwegian inspection stamps like the low-numbered 1897 rifles in South African museums, are known to exist in the US—it is not known if these have Boer connections or were initially delivered elsewhere.

=== Subtypes of the Krag–Jørgensen used in Norway ===
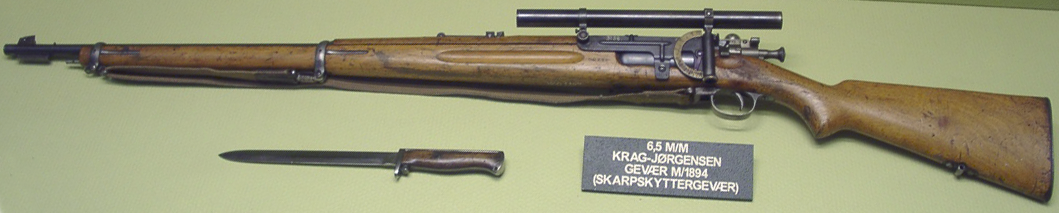
M1894 with telescopic sight

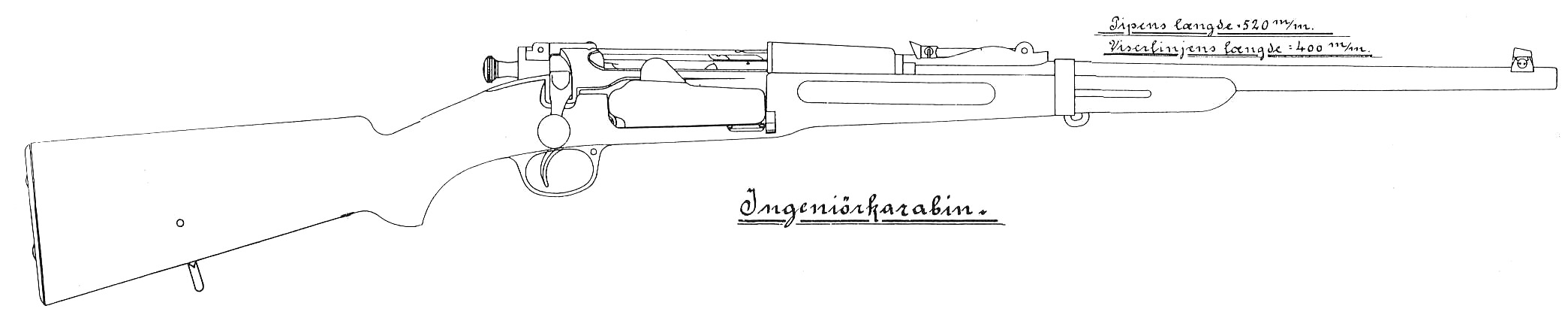
M1897

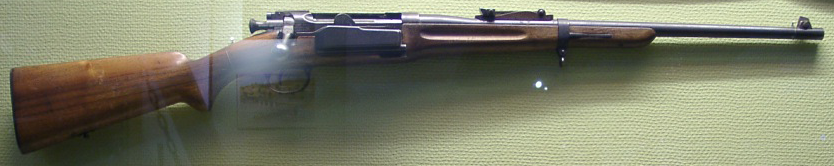
M1906

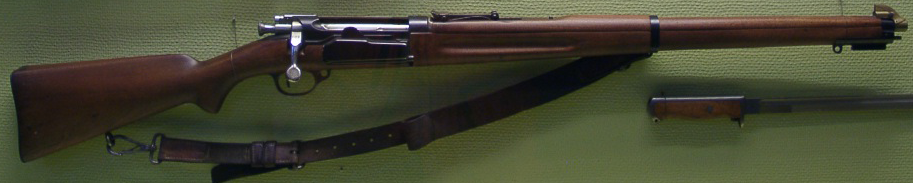
Unmodified M1912

The Krag–Jørgensen was produced in Norway for a very long time, and in a number of different variations. The major military models are the following:

- The M1894 rifle, "long Krag", was the most common Krag in Norway. A total of about 122,817 were produced for the Norwegian Army at Kongsberg until 1922 when production ended. An additional 29,000 were bought from Steyr weapons factory in Austria 1896–1897. In 1910, after some initial tests, 1,000 of the M1894s (serials 89602 to 90601) were fitted with telescopic sights on a specially constructed bracket. Issued five to each company, they were meant to be used against enemy officers and other high-value targets. Since the model was considered to be less than satisfactory, further production was stopped. 3396 M/1894 rifles were produced in a special serial range for the Norwegian Navy. For the civilian market in Norway (competition shooters and hunters), afbout 33,600 M/1894 rifles in a special serial range were made from 1895 to 1940. An additional 4500 M/1894 rifles were procured from Steyr in a special series for the civilian marksmanship organization in 1897 (serials 3001–7500). All in all, the M/1894 is by far the most common model of the Norwegian Krag models.
- The M1895 cavalry carbine and M1897 mountain artillery and engineer carbine differed only in how the sling swivel was fitted to the stock, and were issued in one series. A total of 9,309 were made between 1898 and 1906.
- The M1904 engineer carbine and M1907 field artillery carbine differed from the earlier carbines mainly by being stocked to the muzzle. The difference between the two models was only in the attachment of the sling, and again they were issued as one series. A total of 2,750 M/1904 and 750 M/1907 were produced between 1906 and 1908.
- The M1906 Guttekarabin (boy's carbine) was a simplified M1895 carbine, with a shortened stock and no hand guard. They were issued to schools in Norway, and used to train boys aged 14 to 17 to shoot. Special "school ammunition" was developed to allow shooting in restricted areas. A total of 3,321 were made, of which some 315 were later modified to fire .22 Long Rifle ammunition. Shooting was on the syllabus for Norwegian teens until World War II.
- The M1912 carbine / M1912/16 carbine / M1912/18 carbine, "short rifle", was made after it became clear that the long barreled M1894 left something to be desired. The M1912 was adopted after experiments with shorter, thicker barrels and different projectiles. It differed from the earlier models by being stocked all the way to the muzzle; the bracket for the bayonet was moved from the barrel to under the stock. The M1912 carbine also featured an improved (strengthened) action which differed from the M/94 action on several points. It was soon clear that the nose band was too weak, which led to the /16 and /18 modifications of the basic design. A total of 30,118 were produced in the military serial number range between 1913 and 1926. It was also decided that any further production would be of this model. About 1592 M1912 were produced in a special serial number range for sale to civilians.
- The M1923 sniper rifle was the first attempt to produce a sniper rifle, but it was not solid enough for use in the field. A total of 630 were built between 1923 and 1926, about half of which were sold to civilian sharpshooters. Most were later converted to M1930 or hunting rifles.
- The M1925 sniper rifle was an improved version of the M1923 built for the civilian market. A total of 1,900 were made from 1925 to the German invasion on April 9, 1940. A further 250 were built for the Germans during the war, and the last 124 were put together in 1950.
- The M1930 sniper rifle was another improvement of the M1923 and M1925, featuring a heavier barrel, a different stock, sights, and a fine tuned trigger. It was a successful weapon, but no more than 466 were built between 1930 and 1939. In 1950 and 1951, an additional 404 M/30 rifles were produced, then with laminated stocks, improved rear (diopter) sights and M/12 actions as the basis. The pre-war M/30 rifles used the M/94 action as the basis.

In addition, most models were produced for the civilian market as well. After World War II a limited number of Krag–Jørgensens were made in purely civilian models.

=== Bayonets for Norwegian Krag–Jørgensen ===
The Swedish-Norwegian Rifle Commission only briefly looked into bayonets, focusing on selecting the best possible rifle. However, their report mentions that they have experimented with knife bayonets and spike bayonets, both in loose forms and in folding forms. Very few of the experimental bayonets are known today.

The bayonet that was finally approved, probably alongside the rifle itself, was a knife bayonet. Later on, longer bayonets were approved as well, and renewed experiments with spike bayonets took place during the development of the M/1912.

- Bayonet M/1894 was a knife bayonet, with a blade length of 21.5 cm, a blade width of 1.9 cm and a total length of 33.5 cm. The scabbard was made of steel, hanging from a leather strap, and was 22.7 cm long. A total of 101750 was manufactured by Kongsberg Våpenfabrikk, Husqvarna and Steyr.
- Bayonet M/1912 was constructed during the development of the "short rifle" that became the M1912 carbine. It was significantly longer than the M/1894, to maintain the "reach" of the soldier. The total length of the bayonet was 48.5 cm, of which 38.5 cm was blade. The very long blade proved to be too weak for actual use (it had "double fullers" on each side of the blade), and the Bayonet M/1913 was adopted instead. Most likely less than 50 M/1912 bayonets were produced.
- Bayonet M/1913 was stronger, but heavier (only one "fuller" on each side), than the M/1912 but was of identical size. However, it soon became clear that the short rifles were too weak in the stock to be used with the very long bayonets, which led to the development of the strengthened M1912/16 and M1912/18 carbines. Production of the M/1913 bayonet was ended in favour of the M/1916 after about 3000 M/1913 bayonets had been manufactured by Kongsberg Våpenfabrikk. The M/1913 bayonets were issued with a leather scabbard.
- Bayonet M/1916 was meant to be used on both the short carbines and the long rifles. Of almost identical size to the previous M/1913, it was stronger and had a sharpened edge along both sides of the blade's point. The scabbards to the M/1916 were initially made of leather (for M/1912 carbine serials 12159–12178, 13179-16678 og 21479–21678), but were later changed to steel (for M/1912 carbine serials 21679–30118 and M/1894 rifle serials 121000–152000).
- Bayonet M/1894/1943 was a variation of the bayonet M/1894 manufactured during the war for delivery to Nazi Germany. Only 3,300 were manufactured, all of them lower quality than the bayonets delivered before the German invasion.

A number of special bayonets and oddities were experimented with during the time the Krag–Jørgensen was a Norwegian service rifle, two of which are mentioned here.

- The officers bayonet was an attempt to replace the traditional side arm for officers in dress uniform with a high quality, decorated M/1916. The prototype was made in 1928, with two different scabbards (one in black lacquered steel, the other in brown leather), polished blade and the coat of arms inlaid in the handle. The bayonet was never issued, and the prototype is lost.
- The bayonet lengthener' was a special scabbard for the M/1894 with a bayonet mount added. By mounting the bayonet to the scabard, and the scabbard to the rifle, a total length of 47 cm was achieved. It is speculated that the reason was to achieve the same reach as with the M/1916 without having to scrap the huge quantities of M/1894 in storage. The lengthener was never issued.

== Production for Nazi Germany during World War II ==
During the occupation of Norway by Nazi Germany, the German forces demanded that Kongsberg Våpenfabrikk build weapons for the German armed forces. They placed large orders for the Krag–Jørgensen, the Colt M1914 (license-produced Colt M1911), and 40 mm anti-aircraft guns. However, production was kept down by sabotage and slow work by the employees. Out of the total of 13,450 rifles ordered by the Germans, only between 3,350 and 3,800 were actually delivered. Early deliveries were identical to the M1894, but with German proof marks and substandard workmanship compared to M1894 produced earlier. During the war the model was altered to be externally more like the German Kar98K. This was achieved by shortening the barrel by 15 cm (6 inches) down to 61.3 cm (24 inches) and shortening the stock by 18 cm (7 inches), and adding a front sight hood similar to that of the Kar98K. These shortened Krag–Jørgensen's were known in Norway as the Stomperud-Krag, nicknamed after the main character from Norwegian comedy comic strip Nr. 91 Stomperud. A number of the Krag–Jørgensens manufactured for the Germans have been described as "bastards", created from mismatched parts left over from previous production.

Experiments with using the German standard issue 7.92×57mm ammunition, a cartridge as powerful as the .30-06 and the modern 7.62 mm NATO, also took place.

While information on the Wehrmacht's use of the Krag–Jørgensen is hard to find, it is assumed that it was issued primarily to second line units since the Wehrmacht attempted to only issue firearms in standard calibres to front line troops. It was also issued to the Hird—the armed part of Nasjonal Samling (NS) ("National Unity"), the national-socialist party of Vidkun Quisling's puppet government. It is further likely that the experiments with 7.92 mm ammunition means that the Germans considered a wider use of the Krag–Jørgensen.

== Post-war production ==
A few Krag–Jørgensen rifles were put together after 1945, for sale to civilian hunters and sharpshooters, among them 1600 of the so-called Stomperud Krag. While there were at no point any plans for re-equipping the Norwegian Army with the Krag–Jørgensen, attempts were made to adapt it to firing more modern, high-powered ammunition like the .30-06 and 7.62mm NATO rounds. While this was found to be possible, it required a new barrel (or relined barrels) and modification to the bolt and receiver. The resulting cost of the conversion was about the same as that of a new gun of a more modern design. The last Krag–Jørgensen rifles in production were the M/1948 Elgrifle (moose rifle), of which 500 were made in 1948–49 and the M/1951 Elgrifle (moose rifle), of which 1000 were made in 1950–51.

=== As a civilian target rifle ===
Before the Sauer 200 STR was approved as the new standard Scandinavian target rifle, rebarreled and re-stocked Krag–Jørgensen rifles were the standard Norwegian target rifle together with the Kongsberg-Mauser M59 and M67. The Krag was preferred for shooting on covered ranges and in fair weather, and dominated on the speed-shooting exercises due to its smooth action, and very fast loading with a spring speedloader, however it was known to change its point of impact under wet conditions due to the single front locking lug. Thus, many shooters had both a Krag and a "Mauser" for varying conditions.

== Special Krag–Jørgensen rifles / carbines and oddities ==
The Krag–Jørgensen was manufactured for almost 60 years in Norway. During this time several special models and prototypes were designed and manufactured. Some of these special weapons were meant as an aid in production or to meet a specific demand, but there were also various attempts to increase the firepower of the weapon.

=== Model rifles ===
The so-called "model rifles" were used both when the various sub types were approved and as a guide for manufacturing. Basically, the model rifle or model carbine was a specially manufactured weapon that showed how the approved weapon should be. They were numbered and stored separately. Several model rifles and carbines were manufactured for things like a change in surface treatment or other seemingly minor things. There were especially many model rifles made for the M1894, since several were sent to Steyr in Austria to work as controls and models.

=== Harpoon rifles ===
A small number of Krag–Jørgensen rifles were converted into harpoon guns, in the same fashion as Jarmann M1884s were converted to Jarmann harpoon rifles. It was realized that converting the Jarmann was more cost efficient than converting the Krag–Jørgensen, so further conversions was halted. It is not known how many were converted in this way.

=== Modified for belt feed ===
The factory museum at Kongsberg Weapon Factory preserved a prototype of an M1894 modified for belt feed. Although no documentation has been uncovered, it's clear that the rifle has been modified at an early stage in the manufacturing process to use the same feed belts that were used on the Hotchkiss heavy machine gun in use in the Norwegian Army at the time.

The backward and forward movement of the bolt operates a mechanism that moves the belt through the receiver, presenting fresh rounds for the weapon. While this may have been advantageous while fighting from fixed fortifications, it cannot have been very practical for the user of the rifle to carry a long feed belt with him in the field. Even so, it is an interesting and early attempt to increase the firepower of the Krag–Jørgensen.

=== Lieutenant Tobiensen's "speed loader" ===
In 1923 Lieutenant Tobiesen, working at Kongsberg Weapon Factory, designed what he called a speed loader for repeating rifles. It can be seen as a new attempt to increase the firepower of the Krag–Jørgensen, just as the attempt to convert it to belt feed. The design consisted of a modified cover that let the user of the rifle attach a magazine from the Madsen light machine gun. The cover had a selector switch, allowing the user to select if he wanted to use the Krag–Jørgensen's internal magazine with its 5 rounds of ammunition, or if he wanted to use the external magazine with 25 rounds.

The design was considered promising enough that eight prototypes were manufactured and tested. However, in testing it was revealed that the heavy magazine mounted on the side of the weapon not only made the rifle more cumbersome to carry and use, but also made it twist sideways. It was decided that the "speed loader" was not a practical design for military use and no further manufacture took place.

In 1926, a group of seal hunters approached Kongsberg Weapon Factory and asked to purchase a number of speedloaders for use when hunting seals from small boats. They were turned down due to the high cost of manufacturing a limited number of the devices.

=== Modified to self loaders ===
At the same time that the Hotchkiss heavy machine gun was introduced to the Norwegian Army, some people started considering modifying the Krag–Jørgensen to semi-automatic fire. Doing so would have multiplied the firepower of the infantry, allowing more weight of fire to be brought at a target. Most of the designs put forward were not very well thought out and few of the designers knew enough about firearms to be able to calculate the pressures and dimensions necessary. However, two designs were investigated further, and eventually one prototype was built.

==== Sunngaard's automatic rifle ====
In 1915 Sergeant Sunngaard proposed a design for making the Krag–Jørgensen into a selfloading rifle. The design was considered over a period of time before it was declared to be 'quite without value', primarily because the requisite pressure would not be attainable without major redesign of the rifle. For this reason, no prototype was made.

==== Self-loading device SNABB 38 ====
In 1938 a Swedish design called the SNABB was considered. This was a modification that could be made to virtually any bolt-action rifle allowing it to be converted into a self-loading weapon, therefore presenting a chance to cut costs as compared to manufacturing new weapons. The device used gas pressure to operate the bolt handle with the help of a runner. The modification was deemed by some to be unnecessarily complicated. A separate pistolgrip was needed, and the receiver needed major modifications.

A prototype was manufactured in the autumn of 1938 and tested for several months. While moderately successful, the modification would cost about three times as much as originally thought, and the project was dropped due to lack of funds.

== Ammunition ==
The various Krag–Jørgensens were manufactured for a wide variety of ammunition. Apart from various civilian calibres, the rifle was manufactured for the following service ammunition:

- US 30–40, a 7.62 mm (0.30 in) rimmed round loaded with 40 grains (3 grams) of smokeless powder. It gave a chamber pressure of 40000 lbf/in² (276 MPa), which resulted in a muzzle velocity of 609.6 m/s (2000 ft/s) in the rifles, and 597.4 m/s (1960 ft/s) from the shorter barrel of the carbines.
- 6.5×55mm, a 6.5 mm (0.256 in) rimless round. Most variations are loaded for a chamber pressure of 350 MPa (roughly 51000 lbf/in²). Early rounds, with a 10.1 grams (156 grains) long round nosed bullet (B-projectile) had a muzzle velocity of around 700 m/s (roughly 2300 ft/s), while later rounds with a 9 grams (139 grains) spitzer bullet (D-projectile) offered a muzzle velocity up to 780 m/s (2559 ft/s).
- Danish 8×58mmR, a 7.87 mm (0.31 in) rimmed round. Early rounds had a 15.3 grams (236 grains) long round nosed bullet, and was loaded so that it produced a muzzle velocity of about 580 m/s (roughly 1900 ft/s), while later rounds had a 12.8 grams (198 grains) spitzer bullet and gave a muzzle velocity of 823 m/s (2740 ft/s).

Contrary to some rumors, the Krag–Jørgensen action can be modified to fire modern, high-power cartridges. During World War II, and also in the early 1950s, several were produced in 7.92×57mm, which can hardly be considered a low-power cartridge. A number of Krag–Jørgensens have also been converted to .30-06 and 7.62×51mm NATO for target shooting and hunting. However, it must be stressed that these were all late-production Norwegian Krag–Jørgensen rifles, made in an era when metallurgy was vastly more advanced than when the American Krag–Jørgensen rifles were made. Krag–Jørgensen rifles also only have a single locking lug.

Nonetheless, older rifles may benefit from milder loads. Modern European 6.5×55mm rounds are sometimes loaded to a CIP maximum of 55000 PSI, but 6.5×55mm rounds marked "safe for the Krag" are loaded to a milder 40600 PSI. SAAMI specifications call for maximum average pressure of 46000 PSI, sufficient for 2,380 ft/s (730 m/s) with a 160 grain bullet.

== Comparison of service rifles ==
What follows is a comparison between the Danish, American and Norwegian service weapons.

Nation	Model	Length	Barrel length	Weight
Denmark	Rifle 1889	1328 mm / 52.28 in	832 mm / 32.78 in	4.275 kg / 9.5 lb
Denmark	Carbine 1889	1100 mm / 43.3 in	610 mm / 24 in	3.96 kg / 8.8 lb
Denmark	Sniper rifle 1928	1168 mm / 46 in	675 mm / 26.6 in	5.265 kg / 11.7 lb
US	M1892 rifle	1244.6 mm / 49 in	762 mm / 30 in	4.221 kg / 9.38 lb
US	M1892 carbine	1046.5 mm / 41.2 in	558.8 mm / 22 in	3.735 kg / 8.3 lb
US	M1896 rifle	1244.6 mm / 49 in	762 mm / 30 in	4.023 kg / 8.94 lb
US	M1896 cadet rifle	1244.6 mm / 49 in	762 mm / 30 in	4.05 kg / 9.0 lb
US	M1896 carbine	1046.5 mm / 41.2 in	558.8 mm / 22 in	3.488 kg / 7.75 lb
US	M1898 rifle	1247.1 mm / 49.1 in	762 mm / 30 in	4.05 kg 9.0 lb
US	M1898 carbine	1046.5 mm / 41.2 in	558.8 mm / 22 in	3.51 kg / 7.8 lb
US	M1899 carbine	1046.5 mm / 41.2 in	558.8 mm / 22 in	3.542 kg / 7.87 lb
US	M1899 constable carbine	1046.5 mm / 41.2 in	558.8 mm / 22 in	3.614 kg / 8.03 lb
Norway	M1894 rifle	1267,5 mm / 49.9 in	760 mm / 29.9 in	4.221 kg / 9.38 lb
Norway	M1895 & M1897 carbines	1016 mm / 40 in	520 mm / 20.5 in	3.375 kg / 7.5 lb
Norway	M1904 & M1907 carbines	1016 mm / 40 in	520 mm / 20.5 in	3.78 kg / 8.4 lb
Norway	M1906 boy's carbine	986 mm / 38.8 in	520 mm / 20.5 in	3.375 kg / 7.5 lb
Norway	M1912 short rifle	1107 mm / 43.6 in	610 mm / 24 in	3.96 kg / 8.8 lb
Norway	M1923 sniper rifle	1117 mm / 44 in	610 mm / 24 in	4.05 kg / 9.0 lb
Norway	M1925 sniper rifle	1117 mm / 44 in	610 mm / 24 in	4.455 kg / 9.9 lb
Norway	M1930 sniper rifle	1220 mm / 48 in	750 mm / 29.5 in	5.157 kg / 11.46 lb

== Comparison with contemporary rifles ==
At the time of adoption in Denmark, the United States and Norway, the Krag–Jørgensen was seen as the best available rifle. Here it is compared with rifles of later decades. In the U.S. trials, the Krag competed against the Mauser Model 92 (as well as many other designs), not the improved Model 98. The Japanese Type 38 was adopted starting 1905, nearly two decades after the first Krag design.

Rifle	Danish Krag–Jørgensen 1889	US Krag–Jørgensen M1892	Norwegian Krag–Jørgensen M1894	Japanese Type 38 Rifle	German Gewehr 98	British Lee–Enfield (late model)
Effective range	unknown	unknown	unknown	unknown	1,000 m	800 m
Magazine capacity	5	5	5	5	5	10
Calibre	8×58R (7.87 mm)	.30-40 (7.62 mm)	6.5×55mm	6.5x50mm Arisaka	7.92×57mm Mauser	.303 (7.7×56R mm)
Muzzle velocity	580 m/s (early rounds); 823 m/s (late rounds)	609.6 m/s	700 m/s (early rounds); 780 m/s (late rounds)	765 m/s	639 m/s (early rounds); 878 m/s (late rounds)	774 m/s
Barrel length	83.2 cm	76.2 cm	76 cm	79.7 cm	74 cm	64 cm
Total length	132.8 cm	124.5 cm	126.8 cm	128 cm	125 cm	112.8 cm
Loaded weight	4.28 kg	4.22 kg	4.22 kg	3.95 kg	4.09 kg	4.17 kg

== Users ==
- Congo Free State: Used by Norwegian mercenaries
- Cuba
- Dominican Republic
- Denmark
- Haiti
- Liberia
- Mexico: Springfield Model Krag purchased by the Huerta regime; issued to Constitutionalist forces after the US recognized Carranzas government in 1914.
- Nazi Germany
- New Zealand
- Nicaragua
- Norway
- First Philippine Republic: Used the Springfield Model Krag in Philippine-American War
- South African Republic:100 Steyr made M1894 ordered after the Jameson Raid.
- United States: Produced by the Springfield Armory as the Springfield Model Krag
- Iceland

== Conflicts ==
- Apache Wars
- Spanish-American War
- Battle of Sugar Point
- Philippine American War
- Second Boer War
- Boxer Rebellion
- Mexican Revolution
- World War I
- Banana Wars
- Battle of Blair Mountain
- World War II
- Bay of Pigs Invasion

== See also ==
- Antique guns
- Krag–Jørgensen pistol
- List of individual weapons of the U.S. Armed Forces

Other Norwegian rifles:

- Kongsberg Skarpskyttergevær M59 – The Norwegian sniper rifle
- Kongsberg Skarpskyttergevær M67 – The 1967 redesign of the M59
- Våpensmia NM149 – the rifle that replaced the M59F1 as a Norwegian sniper rifle

Contemporary rifles

- M1895 Navy Lee – another rifle in US service at the time.
- Mosin–Nagant – the Russian service rifle from 1891.
