= Kongsberg M67 =

- Type: Bolt Action Repeating Target rifle
- Place of origin: Norway

Service history
- In service: N/A
- Used by: Norway

Production history
- Designer: Kongsberg Small Arms
- Designed: 1967
- No. built: N/A

Specifications
- Mass: 6.4 kg
- Barrel length: 700 mm barrel
- Cartridge: 7.62×51mm NATO, 6.5×55mm, .22LR
- Action: Bolt action
- Rate of fire: N/A
- Muzzle velocity: 860-880 m/s
- Effective firing range: 800 m
- Feed system: 5-round magazine
- Sights: Target aperture sight

The Kongsberg M67 is a bolt-action sharpshooter rifle made by Kongsberg Våpenfabrikk (currently Kongsberg Small Arms) of Norway, based on actions from Mauser M98k left by German armed forces in 1945. The M67 replaced the M59 in 1967 and was produced until the 1990s. The rifle is sometimes unofficially referred to as Mauser M67. However, both M59 and M67 were not licensed products of Mauser, but were produced by Kongsberg and marketed as such.

Before the SIG Sauer 200 STR was approved for Scandinavian target shooting, the M67 and the Krag–Jørgensen were the most popular target rifles in Norway. Due to the Krag's propensity to change its point of impact under wet conditions, many shooters preferred to use the Krag for shooting on covered ranges and the M67 for field shooting.

Most parts of this rifle, like the M59, were made from former Mauser M98 rifles but fitted with a heavy target barrel, a new oversize target stock, Busk target front and rear peep sight with 0.1 mrad adjustments (1 cm at 100 meters), and a rubber recoil pad. From 1975 the rifles had an adjustable trigger (M75), before that they had military M98K triggers. From 1990 the rifles had an adjustable UIT target stock.

The gun weighed 6,400 grams and was available in 7.62×51 (.308 Win), 6.5×55 Mauser/Skan and .22 LR for the recruit-class.

In the .22LR version, the barrel was switched, the magazine follower and spring was removed and the bolt was changed to be able to fire rimfire ammunition. This model had no magazine and was a single-shot rifle.

This rifle does not have a peep rear sight but rather a diopter rear sight.

== See also ==
- List of firearms

Other Norwegian rifles:

- Kammerlader - the first breech-loading rifle in service in Norway.
- Remington M1867 - the first rifle for metallic cartridges adopted by the Norwegian Army
- Krag–Petersson - the first rifle designed by Ole H J Krag that was adopted by an armed force.
- Jarmann M1884 - the rifle the Norwegian Krag–Jørgensen replaced.
- Krag–Jørgensen - the most successful Norwegian firearm to date
- Kongsberg Skarpskyttergevær M59 - The 1959 Norwegian sniper rifle and the predecessor of the M67
- Våpensmia NM149 - the rifle that replaced the M59F1 as a Norwegian sniper rifle

== References and notes ==
- Hanevik, Karl Egil (1998). Norske Militærgeværer etter 1867. Hanevik Vapen. ISBN 82-993143-1-3
