= Lesnevich =

Lesnevich is a surname. Notable people with the surname include:

- Alex Marzano-Lesnevich, American author and lawyer
- Gus Lesnevich (1915–1947), American boxer
