= Kongsberg M59 =

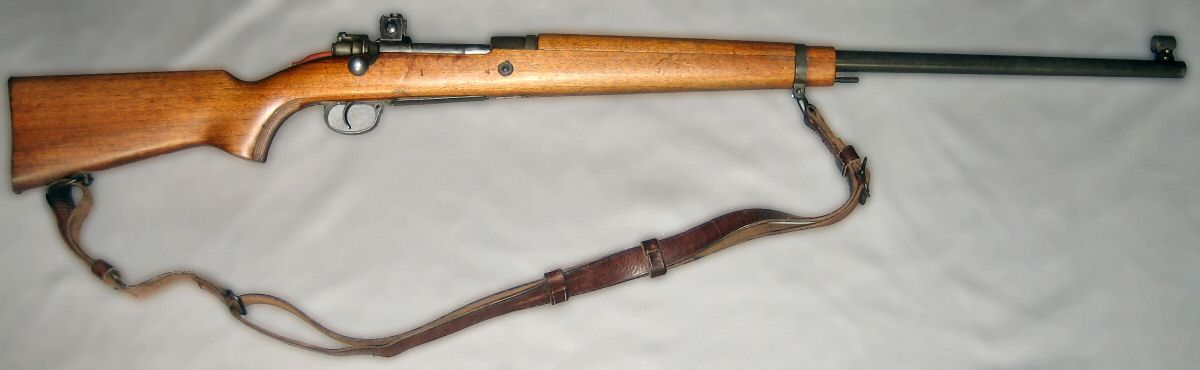
- Kongsberg Våpenfabrikk M59
- Type: Sniper rifle
- Place of origin: Norway

Service history
- In service: 1959 - ca. 2000
- Used by: Norway

Production history
- Designer: Kongsberg Small Arms
- Designed: 1959
- No. built: N/A
- Variants: M59 and M59F1

Specifications
- Cartridge: .30-06 (M59) 7.62 × 51 mm NATO (M59F1)
- Action: Bolt action
- Rate of fire: N/A
- Muzzle velocity: 860-880 m/s
- Effective firing range: 800 m
- Feed system: 5-round magazine
- Sights: Target aperture sight

The Kongsberg M59 (also known as KV59) is a sniper rifle produced by Kongsberg Arms of Norway based on left-behind K98k actions from the German World War 2 occupation, in a similar fashion to the later Kongsberg M67. Even though these rifles are sometimes called Mauser M59 and Mauser M67, they were not licensed products of Mauser, but were produced by Kongsberg and marketed as such.

== Mauser rifles in Norway ==
After WW2, large numbers of German Mauser 98k were confiscated by Norwegian forces. Most of the rifles were re-barrelled to .30-06 and used as normal service rifles, but a number of Mauser 98 actions were used as the basis for building both military sniper and civilian target rifles at Kongsberg Våpenfabrikk. Target shooting is very popular in Norway, and stocks of the Krag–Jørgensen M1894 were scarce after the end of the war. The Mauser rifles were available and very well suited to conversion into target rifles for use by the Norwegian DFS. The M59, M67 and the Krag–Jørgensen were the official target rifles of the Norwegian DFS until the adoption of the SIG Sauer 200 STR in the 1990.

== Kongsberg Våpenfabrikk Skarpskyttergevær M59, "Mauser M59" ==
Kongsberg Våpenfabrikk introduced the M59 (also denoted KV59) in 1959, first chambered in .30-06, but shortly afterwards production was changed to accommodate the new 7.62 NATO round, and M59 rifles chambered for the 7.62 NATO were denoted M59F1. The M59F1 served first as a sniper rifle for the regular armed forces. After the NM149 was introduced, the M59F1 served with the Norwegian Home Guard (Heimevernet) until the 1990s. It was also used as a civilian target rifle, having the advantage over the Krag–Jørgensen M1894 that it did not suffer from changing point of impact in rainy weather. Thus, many shooters had a Krag–Jørgensen for the sunny days and one Mauser for rainy days.

=== Technical details and images ===
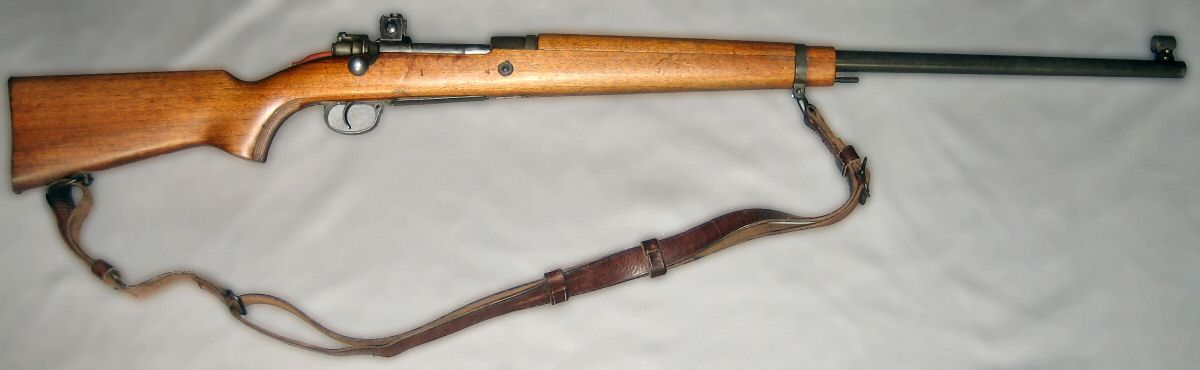
Kongsberg Våpenfabrikk used German Mauser 98k actions for the manufacture of the M59. The picture shows a civilian M59.

Closeup of the action and re-profiled bolt handle:

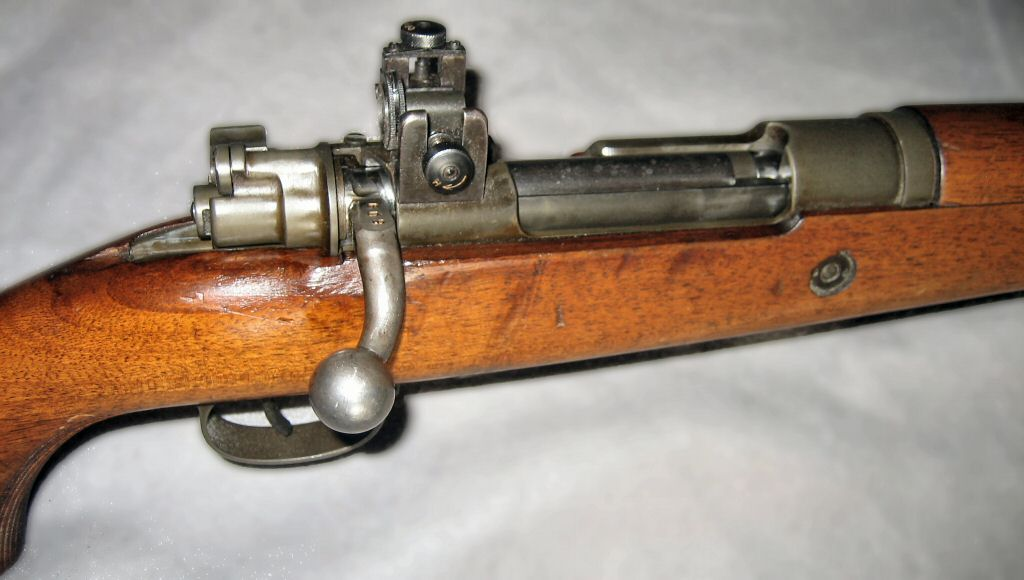

Old markings were removed, and the front receiver bridge was opened to accommodate loading of the somewhat longer (compared to the 7.92×57 mm Mauser) .30-06 cartridge,

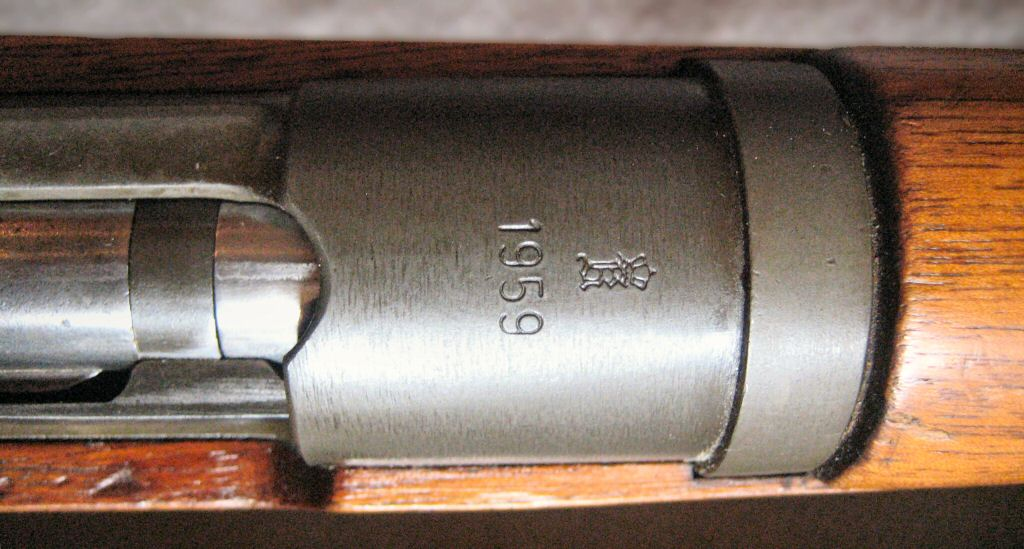

This is also found on the M59 rifles which were re-chambered to the 7.62×51mm NATO cartridge. On the civilian version, only the extractor claw was blued, while the rest of the bolt was polished, while on the army issue M59F1, the whole bolt was blued.

The pistol grip:

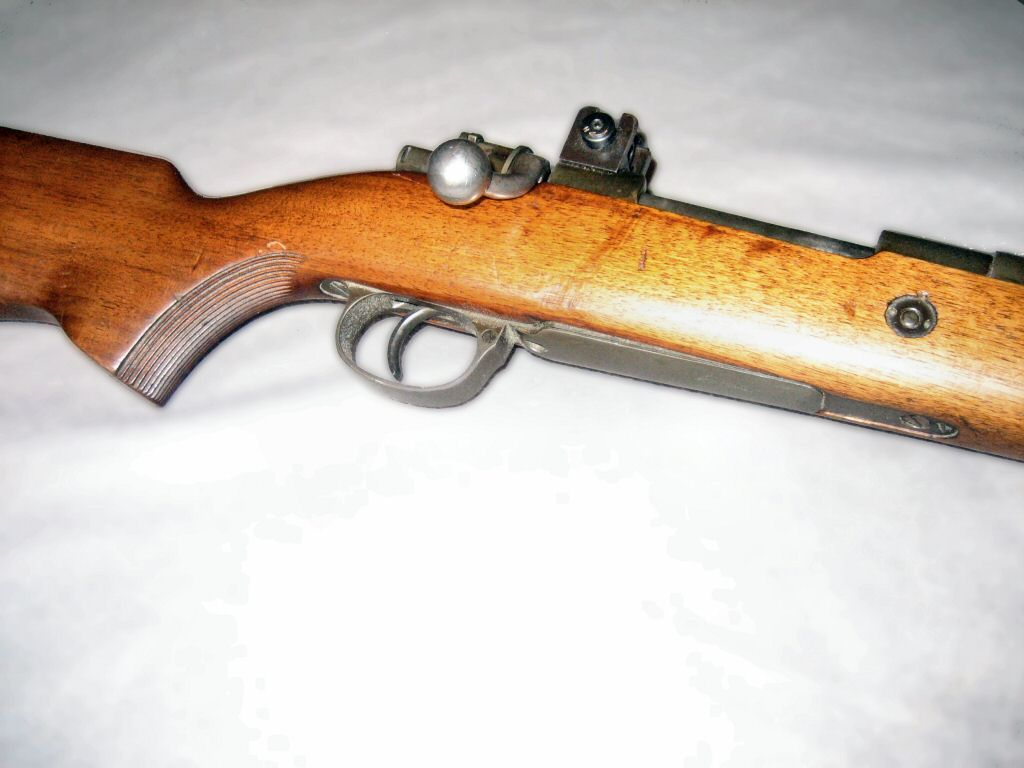

The magazine follower on the 98k would lock the bolt's forward motion on an empty magazine. This feature was retained on the M59:

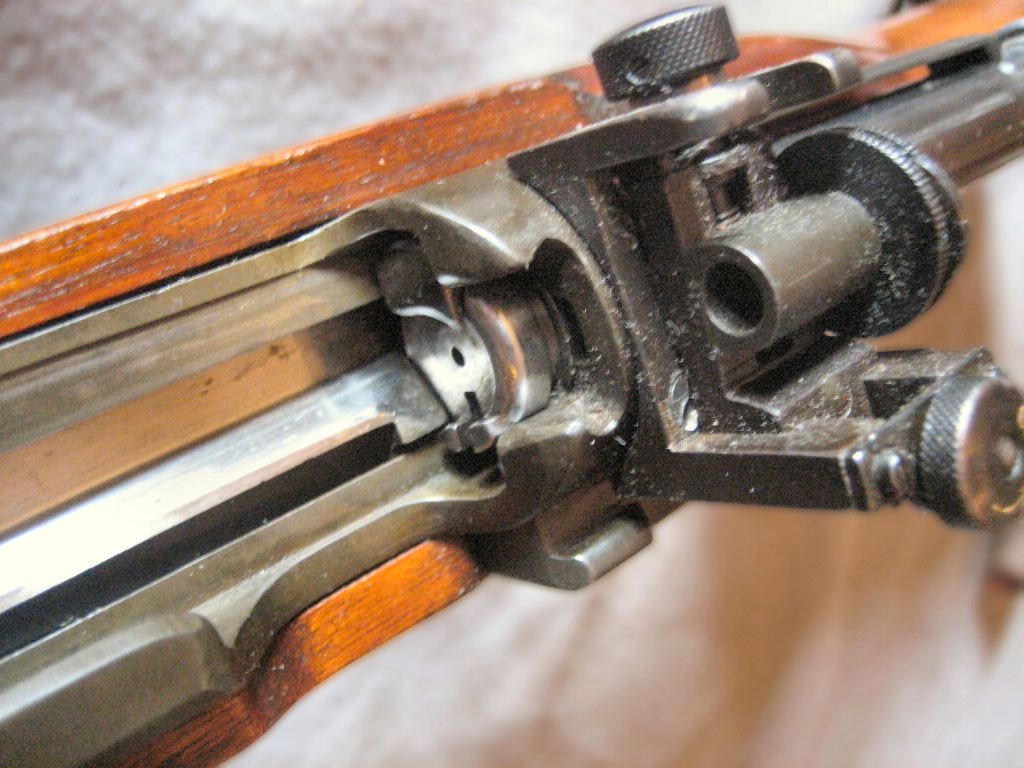

The half-length cleaning rod was screwed into the fore-end. Two to three of these were required to assemble a rod of sufficient length:

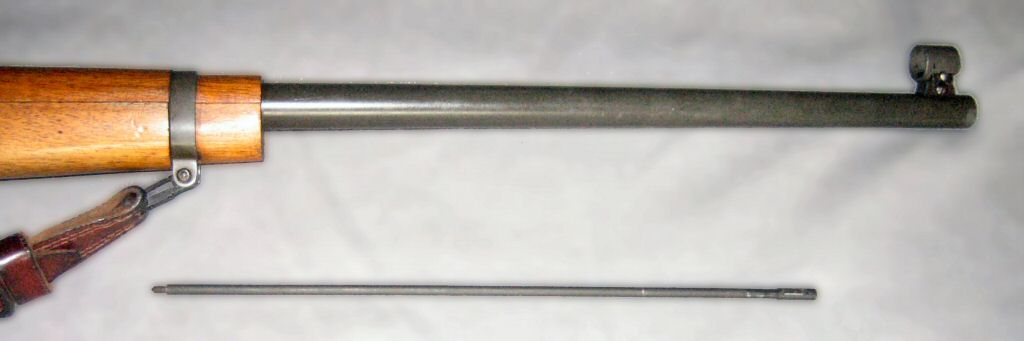

A civilian M59 (top) in .30-06 and the army issue M59F1 in 7.62×51mm NATO (bottom, with a side-mounted scope). Note the blued bolt and absence of the cut-out in the front receiver bridge on the M59F1. Note also the different markings on the front receiver bridge.

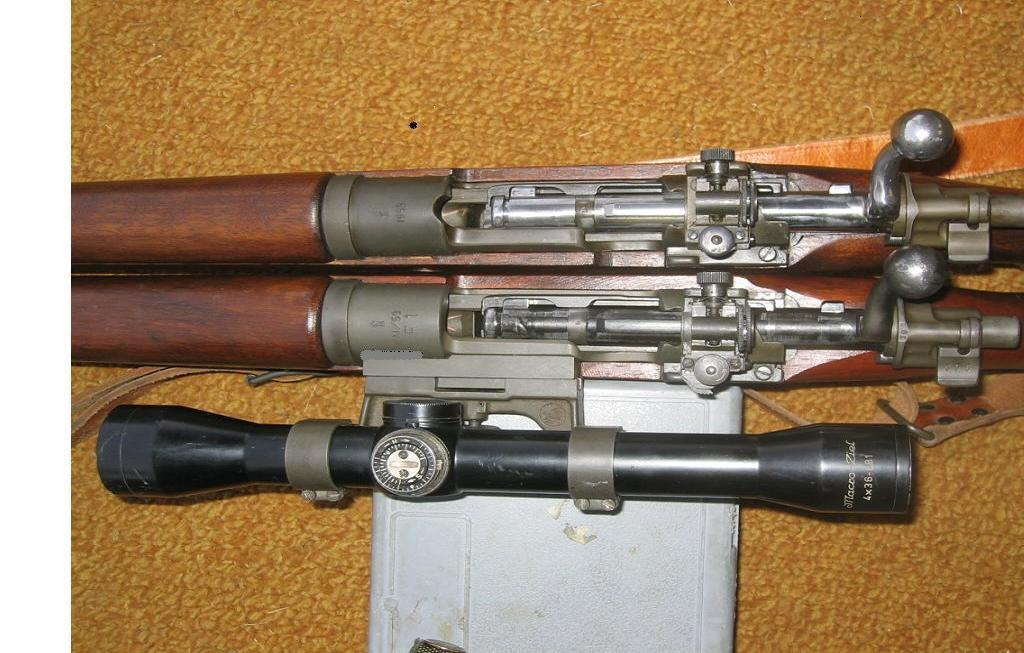

=== Alternative model designations (unofficial) ===
- Kongsberg Våpenfabrikk Modell 1959
- Kongsberg-Mauser M59
- KV59
- KV M59
- Modell 1959 Skarpskytter
- Skarpskytterrifle M59
- Skarpskytterrifle Modell 1959

== Kongsberg Våpenfabrikk Skarpskyttergevær M67, "Mauser M67" ==
The M59 was redesigned in 1967, hence the M67, and was made using a captured World War II German M98 action, fitted with a heavy target stock and barrel. It was usually fitted with Busk diopter sights. It was chambered in 6.5×55mm, 7.62 NATO and in .22 LR as a single shot.

== See also ==
- M59 versions of the SKS rifle
- List of firearms
- List of sniper rifles

Other Norwegian rifles:

- Kammerlader - the first breech-loading rifle in service in Norway.
- Remington M1867 - the first rifle for metallic cartridges adopted by the Norwegian Army
- Krag–Petersson - the first rifle designed by Ole H J Krag that was adopted by an armed force.
- Jarmann M1884 - the rifle the Norwegian Krag–Jørgensen replaced.
- Krag–Jørgensen - the most successful Norwegian firearm to date
- Kongsberg Skarpskyttergevær M67 - The 1967 redesign of the M59
- Våpensmia NM149 - the rifle that replaced the M59F1 as a Norwegian sniper rifle

== References and notes ==
- Karl Egil Hanevik; Hanevik våpen (1998). Norske militærgeværer etter 1867. ISBN 978-82-993143-1-2.
