= Peter Ho Davies =

British writer of Welsh and Chinese descent (born 1966)

- Born: 1966 (age 59–60); Coventry, England
- Education: Manchester University; Cambridge University
- Occupation: Writer
- Notable work: The Ugliest House in the World (1997); The Fortunes (2016)
- Awards: Oregon Book Award; John Llewellyn Rhys Prize; PEN/Macmillan Silver Pen Award; Anisfield-Wolf Book Award; Chautauqua Prize
- Website: peterhodavies.com

Peter Ho Davies (born 30 August 1966) is a contemporary British writer of Welsh and Chinese descent.

== Biography ==
Born and raised in Coventry, England, Davies was a pupil at King Henry VIII School. He studied physics at Manchester University and then English at Cambridge University.

In 1992, he moved to the United States to study in the graduate creative writing program at Boston University. He has taught at the University of Oregon and at Emory University and is currently a professor in the Helen Zell MFA Program in Creative Writing at the University of Michigan in Ann Arbor.

== Awards and honours ==
Davies has received grants from the Guggenheim Foundation and the National Endowment for the Arts. In 2003, he was named by Granta magazine as one of twenty "Best of Young British Novelists".

Both A Lie Someone Told You About Yourself and Equal Love were named as New York Times Notable Book.

His short fiction has appeared in The Atlantic, Harper's and The Paris Review and been widely anthologized, appearing in Prize Stories: The O. Henry Awards 1998, and Best American Short Stories 1995, 1996, and 2001. The Boston Globe named The Welsh Girl one of the best fiction books of 2007, and People magazine named A Lie Someone Told You About Yourself one of the ten best books of the year.

Awards for Davies's writing
Year	Title	Award	Category	Result	Ref.
1998	The Ugliest House in the World	John Llewellyn Rhys Prize	—	Won	
1998	The Ugliest House in the World	Oregon Book Award	—	Won	
1999	The Ugliest House in the World	PEN/Macmillan Silver Pen Award	—	Won	
2000	Equal Love	Los Angeles Times Book Prize	Fiction	Finalist	
2007	The Welsh Girl	Man Booker Prize	—	Longlisted	
2008	—	PEN/Malamud Award	—	Won	
2017	The Fortunes	Anisfield-Wolf Book Award	Fiction	Won	
2017	The Fortunes	Chautauqua Prize	—	Won	
2022	A Lie Someone Told You About Yourself	Aspen Words Literary Prize	—	Longlisted	

== Publications ==
=== Short-story collections ===
- The Ugliest House in the World (1997)
- Equal Love (2000)

=== Novels ===
- The Welsh Girl (2007)
- The Fortunes (2016)
- A Lie Someone Told You About Yourself (2021)

=== Non fiction ===
- The Art of Revision: The Last Word (2021)
