= Erik Jørgensen (gunsmith) =

Norwegian gunsmith (1848–1896)

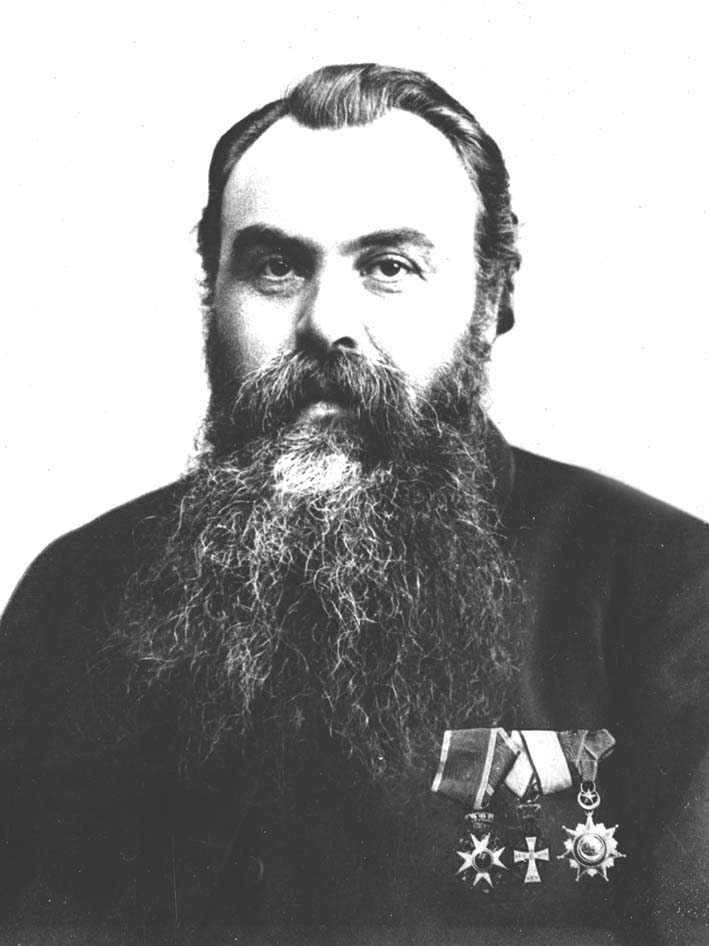
- Jørgensen in a publication by Kongsberg Våpenfabrikk
- Born: 17 May 1848; Asker, Norway
- Died: 15 September 1896 (aged 48)
- Occupation: gunsmith
- Known for: Developing first successful Krag–Jørgensen rifle

Erik Jørgensen (17 May 1848 – 15 September 1896) was a Norwegian master gunsmith, well known for his cooperation with Ole Herman Johannes Krag in developing the first successful Krag–Jørgensen rifle.

== Biography ==
Erik Jørgensen was born in the parish of Asker in Akershus on 17 May 1848 in Norway, and grew up on the farm Solstad. He educated himself to be a gunsmith and started working at Kongsberg Våpenfabrikk (the most important Norwegian weapon factory) in 1870. It was here that he met Ole H J Krag, and from 1871 Jørgensen worked with Krag on his rifles. As time went on, Jørgensen turned from just doing work for Krag to be an active participant in the development of the rifle which later became known as the Krag–Jørgensen.

== Other sources ==
- Norske Militærgeværer etter 1867, by Karl Egil Hanevik, ISBN 82-993143-1-3
