= Isabella Hammad =

British-Palestinian author

- Born: 1990/91; Hammersmith, London, England
- Education: University of Oxford (BA); New York University (MFA)
- Occupation: Writer
- Writing career
- Years active: 2017–present
- Genres: literary fiction, historical fiction, nonfiction
- Notable works: The Parisian (2019); Enter Ghost (2023)
- Notable awards: Palestine Book Award (2019); Sue Kaufman Prize (2020); Encore Award (2024)

Isabella Mariam S. Hammad (Arabic: إيزابيلا حماد; born 1990/91) is a British-Palestinian author. In 2023, she was included on the Granta Best of Young British Novelists list.

== Early life and education ==
Hammad was born in Hammersmith to a Palestinian father and a British-Irish mother. She grew up in Acton, West London. Her Palestinian father, whose family were from Nablus, had previously lived in Lebanon. Hammad studied English at the University of Oxford. After undertaking a literature fellowship at Harvard University, she went on to complete an MFA in creative writing at New York University.

== Career ==
Hammad's writing has appeared in Conjunctions, Granta, The Paris Review, The New York Times, and elsewhere. Her award winning short story, "Mr. Can’aan", was published in The Paris Review in the fall of 2017.

In 2019, Hammad was a National Book Foundation's 5 Under 35 Honoree. The same year, The New York Times named her debut novel, The Parisian, published by Jonathan Cape and Grove Press, one of the Notable Books of the year, and The Guardian included Hammad on their list of the year's "writers of exceptional first novels". Christopher Benfey for The New York Times called the novel "dazzling" and said the book "delves back into the confusing past while remaining wholly anchored in the precarious present." Jehanne Moharram at World Literature Today stated "This is a lovely tale of a gentle person in ungentle times and a wonderful reminder of the great variety of Palestinian people and the wounds they have had to endure."

The Guardian described her second book, Enter Ghost, published in 2023, as being "a story of Palestine, driven by questions of identity and belonging." The novel won 2024 Encore Award given by the Royal Society of Literature to celebrate the "difficult second novel" that follows an author's literary debut. In a starred review, Kirkus Reviews called the book "A thorough and thoughtful exploration of the role of art in the political arena..."

In 2020, Hammad received a Lannan Foundation Literary Fellowship, and in 2023, she was included on the Granta Best of Young British Novelists list, compiled every 10 years since 1983, identifying the 20 most significant British novelists aged under 40.

She has also received a Gerald Freund Fellowship from MacDowell and an Axinn Foundation Fellowship from New York University. She was a speaker at the Palestine Writes Literature Festival in Philadelphia, Pennsylvania on September 22, 2023.

Hammad delivered the Edward Said Memorial Lecture, entitled "Recognizing the Stranger", at Columbia University at the end of September 2023. The lecture was turned into an essay and published in paperback with the title Recognizing the Stranger: On Palestine and Narrative in September 2024. It was longlisted for the 2024 National Book Critics Circle Award for Criticism.

She was the 2024–2025 Mary Ellen von der Heyden Fellow at the Cullman Center at the New York Public Library. In 2026, Hammad was the recipient of a Civitella Ranieri Fellowship in Writing.

She has taught literature and creative writing at Brown University, Al Quds Bard College, and New York University, where she is currently a Writer-in-Residence.

Hammad's third novel, Our Names, will be released by Jonathan Cape on July 1, 2027.

== Awards and honours ==
Awards for Hammad's writing
Year	Title	Award	Result	Ref.
2018	“Mr. Can’aan”	Plimpton Prize for Fiction	Won	
2019	“Mr. Can’aan”	O. Henry Prize for Short Story	Won	
2019	The Parisian	Palestine Book Award	Won	
2020	The Parisian	Betty Trask Award	Won	
2020	The Parisian	Chautauqua Prize	Shortlisted	
2020	The Parisian	Sue Kaufman Prize for First Fiction	Won	
2020	The Parisian	Walter Scott Prize for Historical Fiction	Shortlisted	
2023	Enter Ghost	The Bridge Book Award	Won	
2024	Enter Ghost	Aspen Words Literary Prize	Won	
2024	Enter Ghost	Chautauqua Prize	Shortlisted	
2024	Enter Ghost	Gordon Bowker Volcano Prize	Shortlisted	
2024	Enter Ghost	Royal Society of Literature Encore Award	Won	
2024	Enter Ghost	William Saroyan International Prize for Writing	Shortlisted	
2024	Enter Ghost	Women's Prize for Fiction	Shortlisted	
2024	Recognizing the Stranger: On Palestine and Narrative	National Book Critics Circle Award for Criticism	Longlisted	
2025	Enter Ghost	Clark Fiction Prize	Won	

== Partial bibliography ==
=== Novels ===
- The Parisian. Jonathan Cape, Grove Press. 2019. ISBN 9780802129437.
- Enter Ghost. Grove Press. 2023. ISBN 9780802162380.
- Our Names. Grove Press. 2027. ISBN 9780802169525.

=== Nonfiction ===
- Recognizing the Stranger: On Palestine and Narrative. Grove Press, Black Cat. 2024. ISBN 9780802163929.
