= Chiara Valerio =

Italian author and essayist (born 1978)

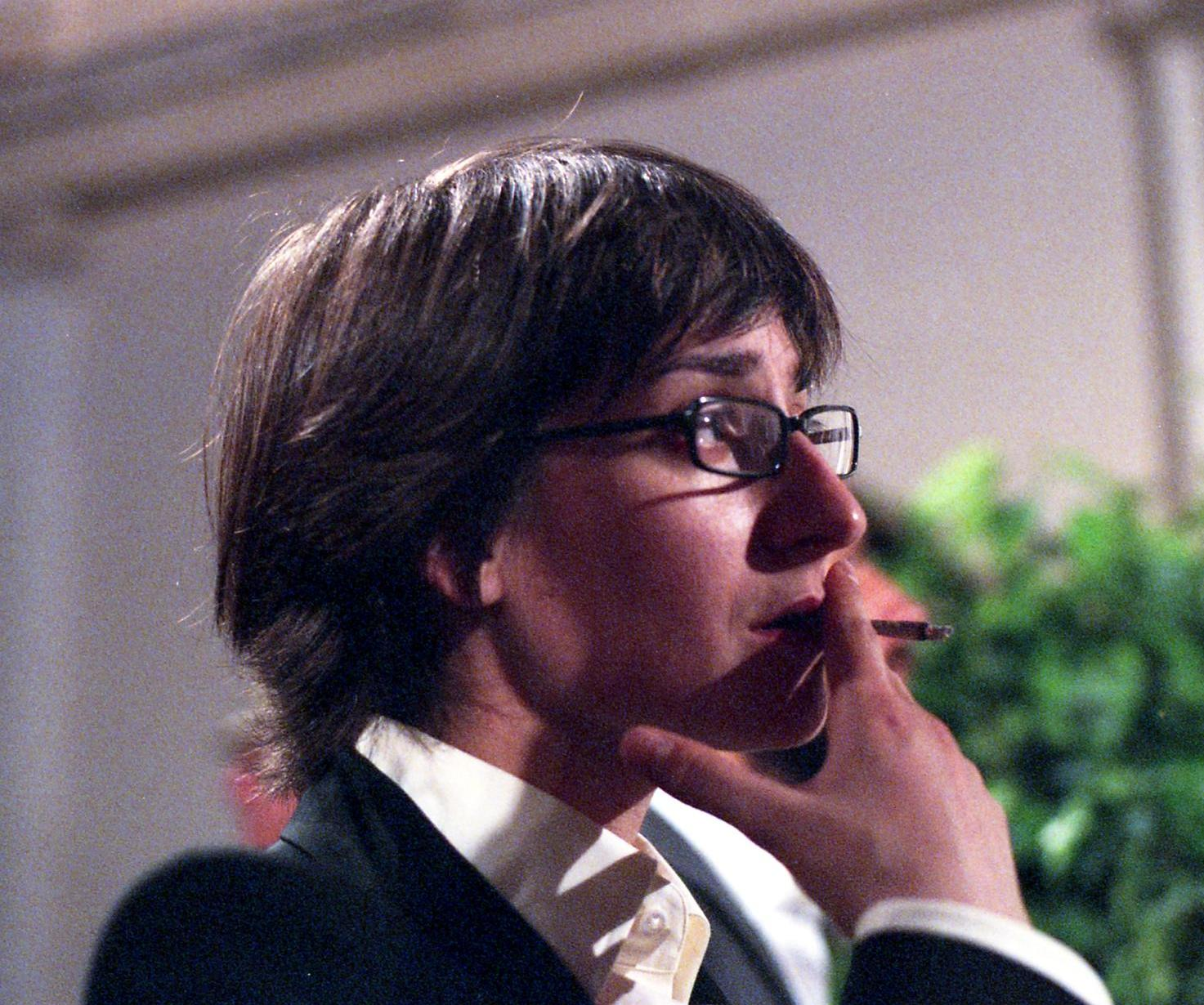
Valerio in 2016

Chiara Valerio (born 3 March 1978) is an Italian author and essayist.

== Early life and education ==
Valerio was born in Scauri, in the province of Latina as part of the Lazio region, in 1978. Although she went on to live in Rome, she spent her childhood and youth in Scauri. She studied and later taught mathematics for many years. With a thesis about probability, Valerio obtained a PhD in mathematics at the University of Naples Federico II, and started working as editor.

== Career ==
Valerio began her career as editor for the Italian magazine Nuovi Argomenti, and contributed to the literary blog Nazione Indiana. During her career, she wrote for the radio and theatre, and worked with the newspapers Domani, La Repubblica, Il Sole 24 Ore, and L'Unità, the magazine Vanity Fair, the weekly publication L'Espresso, and the monthly publication Amica, as well as with the cultural broadcasting Pane quotidiano on the Italian national television channel Rai 3, among other TV programms. Valerio directed the series Narrativa.it for the publishing house Nottetempo, which is dedicated to the emerging writers of Italian fiction. Together with Anna Antonelli, Fabiana Carobolante, and Lorenzo Pavolini, she started working as editor for the radio broadcast Ad alta voce and L'isola destra on Rai Radio 3. In 2010, one of her radio plays, titled "È vostra la vita che ho perso", was broadcast on Radio 3.

Valerio participated in the writing of the main character of Nanni Moretti's film Mia Madre, together with Moretti, Valia Santella, and Gaia Manzini, as well as in that of Gianni Amelio's film Tenderness, together with Amelio and Alberto Taraglio. In 2018, she became an editor-in-chief for the section dedicated to Italian narrative of the publishing house Marsilio, and ideated the PassaParola series. In October 2016, Valerio was named cultural director for Tempo di Libri, the newly created Milan book fair. Her pamphlet Matematica è politics was part of the five finalists for the 2021 Galileo Literary Prize for Scientific Dissemination. With Michela Murgia, she wrote the theatre show Phon – Istruzioni per l'uso, bringing it to the stage on 9 May 2022 at the Teatro Carcano in Milan. In 2023, Valerio worked as editor for the 22nd edition of the book fair Più libri più liberi, and wrote her second pamphlet, published by Giulio Einaudi and titled La tecnologia è religione. In 2024, she wrote Chi dice e chi tace, which was published by Sellerio Editore and nominated to the Premio Campiello.

== Awards ==
In 2004, Valerio won the Premio Carver Narrativa for A complicare le cose. In 2007, the literature festival of the city of Mantua, Festivaletteratura, chose Valerio as the Italian author for "Yound Writings 2007". In 2014, she won the Premio Fiesole Narrativa Under 40 with Almanacco del giorno prima. In 2020, she won the Premio Mondello for Il cuore non si vede. In 2022, Valerio won the Premio The Bridge Narrativa for Così per sempre.

== Works ==
- A complicare le cose, Rome, Robin, 2003, ISBN 978-88-7371-338-8.
- Fermati un minuto a salutare, Rome, Robin, 2007, ISBN 978-88-7371-275-6.
- Ognuno sta solo, Rome, Perrone, 2007, ISBN 978-88-6004-096-1.
- Nessuna scuola mi consola, Rome, Nottetempo, 2009, ISBN 978-88-7452-198-2.
- Spiaggia libera tutti, Rome/Bari, Laterza, 2010, ISBN 978-88-420-9373-2.
- La gioia piccola d'esser quasi salvi, Rome, Nottetempo 2009, ISBN 978-88-7452-206-4.
- Almanacco del giorno prima, Turin, Einaudi, 2014, ISBN 978-88-06-21592-7.
- Storia umana della matematica, Turin, Einaudi, 2016, ISBN 978-88-06-23006-7.
- Il cuore non si vede, Turin, Einaudi, 2019, ISBN 978-88-06-24222-0.
- La matematica è politica, Turin, Einaudi, 2020, ISBN 978-88-06-24487-3.
- Così per sempre, Turin, Einaudi, 2022, ISBN 978-88-06-25256-4.
- La tecnologia è religione, Turin, Einaudi, 2023, ISBN 978-88-06-25186-4.
- Chi dice e chi tace, Palermo, Sellerio, 2024, ISBN 978-8838946257.
- La fila alle poste, Palermo, Sellerio, 2025, ISBN 978-88-3894-844-2.

== Translations and editorships ==
- Virginia Woolf, Flush, Rome, Nottetempo, 2012, ISBN 978-88-7452-343-6.
- Virginia Woolf, Freshwater, Rome, Nottetempo, 2013, ISBN 978-88-7452-422-8.
- Virginia Woolf, Tra un atto e l'altro, Rome, Nottetempo, 2015, ISBN 978-88-7452-546-1.
- Virginia Woolf and Lytton Strachey, Ti basta l'Atlantico? Lettere 1906-1931, Rome, Nottetempo, 2022, with Alessandro Giammei, ISBN 978-88-7452-770-0.
