= Out of Darkness, Shining Light =

2019 historical novel by Petina Gappah

First edition (UK)

Out of Darkness, Shining Light is a 2019 historical novel by Zimbabwean writer and lawyer Petina Gappah. Her fourth novel, it was published by Faber & Faber in the UK and by Scribners in the US. The novel was nominated for an NAACP Image Award in 2020 in the category of Outstanding Literary Work and won the 2020 National Arts Merit Awards for Outstanding Fiction Book.

Colin Grant in The Times Literary Supplement called the book a "powerful and poignant lament to those rendered invisible in the past". Reviewing it for World Literature Today, Sean Guynes concluded: "We need novels like Gappah's Out of Darkness, Shining Light, for they remember the stories that have been papered over by history—by whiteness and empire. As Gappah notes in her acknowledgments, these stories may not be real, but we also know that the histories we read are not totally real either, and stories like Halima's and Jacob's, told through Gappah's expert characterization, are not not-real. They are the possibilities always at the edges of the master narratives we learn; they need only to be brought out of the darkness."
