= Petina Gappah =

Zimbabwean writer, journalist and business lawyer (born 1971)

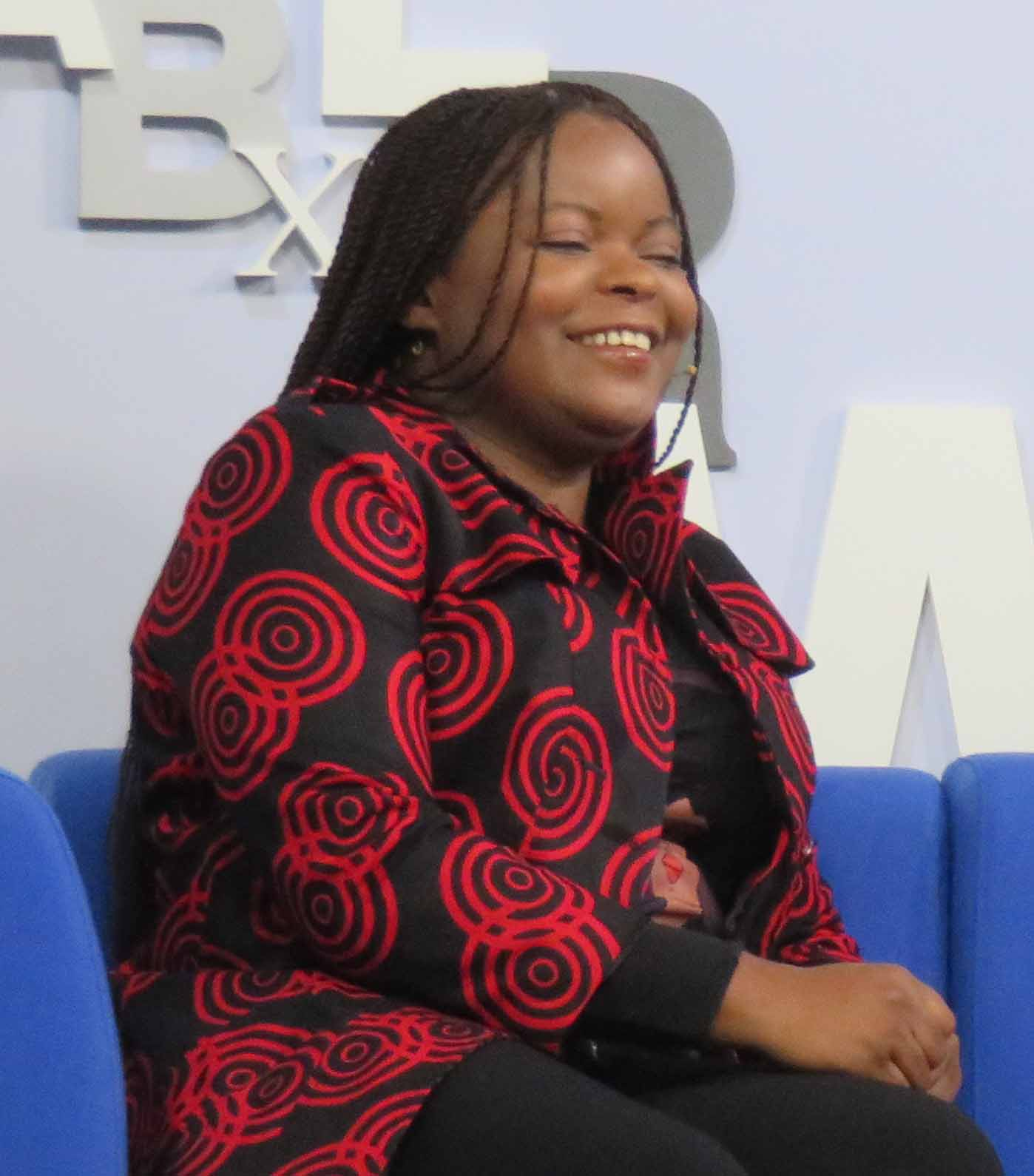
- Born: 1971 (age 54–55); Copperbelt Province, Zambia
- Education: University of Zimbabwe; University of Graz; University of Cambridge
- Occupations: Legal counsel, writer
- Children: 1 son
- Writing career
- Notable work: An Elegy for Easterly (2009)
- Notable awards: Guardian First Book Award

Petina Gappah (born 1971) is a Zimbabwean lawyer and writer. She writes in English, though she also draws on Shona, her first language. In 2016, she was named African Literary Person of the Year by Brittle Paper. In 2017 she had a DAAD Artist-in-Residence fellowship in Berlin.

== Biography ==
=== Early years ===
Petina Gappah was born in Zambia, in Copperbelt Province. She has said: "My father, like many skilled black workers who could not get jobs in segregated Rhodesia, sought his fortune elsewhere. He and my mother moved to Kitwe, a town on the booming Zambian copper belt." She was brought up in Zimbabwe, where her parents returned when she was nine months old. After the country's Independence her family moved to a formerly white area in what is now Harare, and she was one of the first black pupils in a primary school formerly reserved for white children. She started writing aged about 10 or 11, and her first published story was in the St. Dominic's Secondary School magazine when she was 14.

=== Education and career ===
She has a law degree from the University of Zimbabwe, then in 1995 went to Austria to do a doctorate in international trade law at the University of Graz, combined with a master's degree at the University of Cambridge, and since 1998 was based in Geneva, Switzerland, working as an international lawyer.

Gappah said in a 2009 interview: "I started writing seriously in May 2006. I joined the Zoetrope Virtual Studio, a story I posted there caught the attention of an editor at the online journal Per Contra, I entered some stories in competitions, I did well in one competition, and when I was sufficiently confident, I looked for an agent who looked for a publisher on my behalf." Her first book, An Elegy for Easterly, a short-story collection, was published in 2009, and she subsequently published two novels: The Book of Memory in 2015 and Rotten Row in 2016.

Since 2017, she has been a DAAD Fellow and Writer-in-Residence in Berlin.

In June 2017, she delivered the Journal of Southern African Studies Annual Lecture, entitled "Looking for Dr Livingstone's African Companions", at the School of Advanced Study, London University.

== Writing ==
Gappah's first book, An Elegy for Easterly, a story collection that she says is "about what it has meant to be a Zimbabwean in recent times", was published by Faber and Faber in April 2009 in the United Kingdom and in June 2009 in the United States. It was shortlisted for the Frank O'Connor International Short Story Award, the richest prize for the short-story form, as well as for the Orwell Prize and the Los Angeles Times Art Seidenbaum Award for First Fiction. The book has been described as "a collection of stories about every layer of Zimbabwean culture: from the educated and the elite to the quirky, the completely mad and the children running in the street." It won the Guardian First Book Award in 2009, at which time Gappah spoke of her objection to being labelled by her publisher (and subsequently Amazon) as "the voice of Zimbabwe", commenting in an interview: "It's very troubling to me because writing of a place is not the same as writing for a place.... If I write about Zimbabwe, it's not the same as writing for Zimbabwe or for Zimbabweans." An Elegy for Easterly has been translated into several languages, including Chinese, Dutch, Finnish, French, Japanese, Norwegian, Serbian and Swedish.

In 2010, Gappah moved back to Harare for three years to work on her first novel, The Book of Memory. Published in 2015, it is the fictional testament of an imprisoned albino woman on death row, who is hoping for a presidential reprieve. The Book of Memory was described by Maya Jaggi in The Guardian as "a powerful story of innocent lives destroyed by family secrets and sexual jealousy, prejudice and unacknowledged kinship", and by Anita Sethi in The Observer as "a moving novel about memory that unfolds into one about forgiveness, and a passionate paean to the powers of language". In a 2016 interview, Gappah said: "I'm a frustrated historian, which is probably clear from the book. I'm interested in excavating the social histories of Zimbabwe.... History's always distorted to suit a political purpose, but fiction can try to redress the balance. And those are the stories I'm interested in telling—the stories of everyday normal people, who even in this injustice still managed to find their humanity." The Book of Memory was awarded the McKitterick Prize from the Society of Authors in 2015, as well as being longlisted for the Bailey's Women's Prize for Fiction and shortlisted for the Prix Femina étranger.

Her passion for her work remains strong as she writes about Zimbabwe's failings and injustices in the hope that in the face of darkness, change can be achieved.

Gappah's second collection of stories, Rotten Row, was published by Faber in 2016. It was chosen as a "Book of the Day" by The Guardian, whose reviewer FT Kola concluded:

"Rotten Row hums with life, and it delivers one of the keenest and simplest pleasures fiction has to offer: a feeling of true intimacy, of total immersion, in situations not our own, in the selves of others. In its strongest moments, we want to stay there. Gappah has achieved the difficult task of rendering places some of her readers may never know or visit with such intimacy and aliveness that they feel instantly familiar. While this is an entrancing feature of the collection, its greatest achievements are due to her sensitivity to both human tragedy and the comedy inherent in existence. Gappah throws open the doors of a million lighted houses, and lets us look inside them. In each we find something wondrous and strange, not least a reflection of ourselves."

Gappah's 2019 book, Out of Darkness, Shining Light, was nominated for an NAACP Image Award in 2020 in the category of Outstanding Literary Work and won the 2020 National Arts Merit Awards for Outstanding fiction book. Gappah worked with the David Livingstone Birthplace Museum to re-interpret the Charles d'Orville Pilkington Jackson Tableaux. These tableaux feature a range of individuals including Jacob Wainwright, who feature in the book.

Gappah has also written for such outlets as The Financial Times, The New York Times, The Guardian and Süddeutsche Zeitung, and has been a columnist for OmVärlden, the Swedish magazine on development and global affairs.

== Bibliography ==
- —— (2009). An Elegy for Easterly.
- —— (2015). The Book of Memory.
- —— (2016). Rotten Row.
- —— (2019). Out of Darkness, Shining Light.
