= The Bridge Book Award =

Italian-american Literary Prize

The Bridge Book Award (Italian: Premio letterario The Bridge) is an international literary award founded in 2015 with the aim of promoting cultural exchange between Italy and the United States through the translation and dissemination of contemporary fiction and non-fiction from the two countries. The prize was conceived and is curated by Maria Ida Gaeta in collaboration with Maria Gliozzi.

The prize is awarded annually to four literary works: one Italian fiction book, one Italian non-fiction book, one American fiction book, and one American non-fiction book. Winners receive a financial contribution intended for the translation of the work into the language of the other country and take part in meetings and award ceremonies held between Rome and New York City.

== Prize structure ==
The Bridge Prize is divided into an Italian section and an American section, both further divided into fiction and non-fiction categories. Each year, twenty finalist titles are selected: five fiction works and five non-fiction works from each country.

Italian works are evaluated by American juries, while American works are evaluated by Italian juries, according to a system described by the organizers as "specular".

Over the years, the prize has been supported, among others, by the Italian Cultural Institute of New York, the Federazione Unitaria Italiana Scrittori (FUIS), the American Academy in Rome, the Centro Studi Americani, and the Centro per il libro e la lettura (CEPELL).

== Juries ==
The prize includes four juries, two Italian and two American, dedicated respectively to fiction and non-fiction. Jurors include literary critics, translators, scholars, writers, and cultural journalists. According to the regulations, jury members who have a conflict of interest with competing works are temporarily excluded from the relevant edition of the prize.

== Winners ==
Edition	Year	Winning author	Winning work	Publishing house	Category
1st	2015	Domenico Starnone	Lacci	Einaudi	Italian fiction
1st	2015	Quinto Antonelli	Storia intima della Grande Guerra	Donzelli	Italian non-fiction
1st	2015	Laird Hunt	Neverhome	Little, Brown	American fiction
1st	2015	Robert Pogue Harrison	Juvenescence	University of Chicago Press	American non-fiction
2nd	2016	Nadia Terranova	Gli anni al contrario	Einaudi	Italian fiction
2nd	2016	Marco Belpoliti	Primo Levi di fronte e di profilo	Guanda	Italian non-fiction
2nd	2016	Eli Gottlieb	Best Boy	Liveright	American fiction
2nd	2016	Margo Jefferson	Negroland	Pantheon Books	American non-fiction
3rd	2017	Andrea Inglese	Parigi è un desiderio	Ponte alle Grazie	Italian fiction
3rd	2017	Antonella Tarpino	Il paesaggio fragile	Einaudi	Italian non-fiction
3rd	2017	Jennifer Haigh	Heat & Light	HarperCollins	American fiction
3rd	2017	Anna Harwell Celenza	Jazz Italian Style	Cambridge University Press	American non-fiction
4th	2018	Luciano Funetta	Il grido	Chiarelettere	Italian fiction
4th	2018	Sandra Petrignani	La corsara	Neri Pozza	Italian non-fiction
4th	2018	Lesley Nneka Arimah	What It Means When a Man Falls from the Sky	Riverhead Books	American fiction
4th	2018	Arielle Saiber	Measured Words	University of Toronto Press	American non-fiction
5th	2019	Romana Petri	Pranzi di famiglia	Neri Pozza	Italian fiction
5th	2019	Massimo Castoldi	Insegnare libertà	Donzelli	Italian non-fiction
5th	2019	Maaza Mengiste	The Shadow King	W. W. Norton & Company	American fiction
5th	2019	Pamela O. Long	Engineering the Eternal City	University of Chicago Press	American non-fiction
6th	2021	Emanuele Trevi	Due vite	Neri Pozza	Italian fiction
6th	2021	Elisabetta Rasy	Le indiscrete	Mondadori	Italian non-fiction
6th	2021	Danielle Evans	The Office of Historical Corrections	Riverhead Books	American fiction
6th	2021	Patricia Gaborik	Mussolini's Theatre	Cambridge University Press	American non-fiction
7th	2022	Chiara Valerio	Così per sempre	Einaudi	Italian fiction
7th	2022	Walter Siti	Contro l'impegno	Rizzoli	Italian non-fiction
7th	2022	Sara Freeman	Tides	Grove Atlantic	American fiction
7th	2022	Hendrik W. Dey	The Making of Medieval Rome	Cambridge University Press	American non-fiction
8th	2023	Ada D'Adamo	Come d’Aria	Elliot	Italian fiction
8th	2023	Paolo Chiesa	Marckalada	Laterza	Italian non-fiction
8th	2023	Isabella Hammad	Enter Ghost	Grove Atlantic	American fiction
8th	2023	Alison Cornish	Believing in Dante	Cambridge University Press	American non-fiction
9th	2024	Carmen Pellegrino	Dove la luce	La nave di Teseo	Italian fiction
9th	2024	Carlo Vecce	Il sorriso di Caterina	Giunti	Italian non-fiction
9th	2024	Aaron Hamburger	Hotel Cuba	HarperCollins	American fiction
9th	2024	Millicent Marcus	Italian Film in the Present Tense	University of Toronto Press	American non-fiction
10th	2025	Nicoletta Verna	I giorni di vetro	Einaudi	Italian fiction
10th	2025	Giulio Ferroni	Natura vicina e lontana	La nave di Teseo	Italian non-fiction
10th	2025	Julia Phillips	Bear	Penguin Random House	American fiction
10th	2025	Aaron Robertson	The Black Utopians	Farrar, Straus and Giroux	American non-fiction
