= Elizabeth Hartley Winthrop =

American writer (born 1979)

- Born: 1979 (age 45–46); New York City, U.S.
- Occupation: Writer
- Education: Harvard University (BA); University of California, Irvine (MFA)

Website
- www.elizabethwinthrop.net

Elizabeth Hartley Winthrop (born 1979) is an American writer.

She was born in New York City in 1979. She attended Harvard University and graduated Phi Beta Kappa and summa cum laude in 2001, with a B.A. in English and American Literature and Language. She earned an M.F.A. degree in fiction from the University of California, Irvine in 2004, where she was the recipient of the Schaeffer Writing Fellowship.

In addition to her novels, she has written short fiction for Wind, The Evansville Review, The Missouri Review, The Red Rock Review, and Indiana Review. She lives in Gloucester, Massachusetts with her husband and daughter, and she is Associate Professor of English/Creative Writing at Endicott College.

== Works ==
- Fireworks (2006)
- December (2008)
- The Why of Things (2013)
- The Mercy Seat (2018)
