= Andrew Krivak =

American writer

Andrew Krivák
- Born: Pennsylvania, U.S.
- Education: St. John's College (BA); Columbia University (MFA); Fordham University (MA); Rutgers University (PhD)
- Occupations: Writer, poet, professor
- Writing career
- Genres: historical fiction, nonfiction, literary fiction, dystopian fiction
- Notable works: The Sojourn; The Bear
- Website: www.andrewkrivak.com

Andrew Krivák is an American novelist and poet. He is the author of five novels, two chapbooks of poetry, and one book of nonfiction.

== Early life and education ==
Krivák grew up in Wilkes-Barre, Pennsylvania. Both of his parents are the children of Slovak immigrants. Krivák grew up listening to stories about his grandmother’s life in Czechoslovakia and emigrating to the United States by herself at age 16.

Both of his grandfathers worked in coal mines. His paternal grandfather died in a mine cave-in, while his maternal grandfather died of black lung. This family history inspired the events in his novel Mule Boy.

Krivák holds a BA from St. John's College, an MFA in poetry from Columbia University, an MA in philosophy from Fordham University, and a PhD in literary modernism from Rutgers University.

== Career ==
His debut novel, The Sojourn (2011) was nominated for the National Book Award for Fiction, won the Dayton Literary Peace Prize, and was well received critically. The Sojourn in the first book in the Dardan Trilogy, a historical fiction series set in the fictional town of Dardan, Pennsylvania. The trilogy chronicles the lives of two war-haunted Slovakian-immigrant families across generations, inspired by his own family's history. The second and third books of the trilogy are The Signal Flame (2017) and Like the Appearance of Horses (2023). The Signal Flame received a starred review from Publishers Weekly. Like the Appearance of Horses received a starred review from Kirkus Reviews. The Sojourn received starred reviews from both.

Krivák wrote a memoir about his time in the Jesuit order, where he spent eight years pursuing becoming a priest before deciding to leave the order, A Long Retreat: In Search of a Religious Life (2008).

He is editor of The Letters of William Carlos Williams to Edgar Irving Williams, 1902-1912, published in 2009, which won the Louis Martz Prize for scholarly research on William Carlos Williams.

Krivák's third novel, The Bear, a dystopian literary novel, was published in early 2020. It is about a girl and her father, who are the last of humankind, living in the shadow of a mountain as the father prepares his daughter to live a life in harmony with nature. The book received a starred review from Kirkus Reviews, calling it "A moving post-apocalyptic fable for grown-ups... Ursula K. Le Guin would approve. An effective, memorable tale." Wendy Smith at The Washington Post wrote, "Krivak’s serene and contemplative novel invites us to consider a vision of time as circular, of existence as grand and eternal beyond the grasp of individuals".

He received the 2025 Moth Poetry Prize for his poem "Raccoon Baculum Good Luck Charm".

His fifth novel, Mule Boy, was released February 24, 2026. It received a starred review from Kirkus Reviews, "Krivak manages to portray an entire life as a fever dream through the anxious propulsion of an entire book that unfolds as a single sentence." The novel also received a starred review from Publishers Weekly, which said, "Krivak brilliantly succeeds at plumbing the depths of the human spirit and showing how the dead live on in memory. This is flawless."

Krivák is a visiting lecturer for the English department at Harvard University. He previously taught at Boston College. He is a volunteer discussion facilitator in the New Hampshire Department of Corrections Family Connections Center.

== Personal life ==
Krivák lives with his wife and three children in Somerville, Massachusetts, and Jaffrey, New Hampshire. He has previously lived in London, Moscow, and Slovakia. He has previously worked in Santo Domingo and the Bronx.

== Partial bibliography ==
=== Novels ===
==== The Dardan Trilogy ====
  - The Sojourn (2011)
  - The Signal Flame (2017)
  - Like the Appearance of Horses (2023)

==== Standalone novels ====
- The Bear (2020)
- Mule Boy (2026)

=== Poetry collections ===
- Islands (1999)
- Ghosts of the Monadnock Wolves (2021)

=== Nonfiction/Memoir ===
- A Long Retreat: In Search of a Religious Life (2008)

=== As editor ===
- The Letters of William Carlos Williams to Edgar Irving Williams, 1902-1912 (2009)
