= Ken Krimstein =

American author and lecturer

Ken Krimstein is an American author and lecturer. He works as a cartoonist in The New Yorker, where he has been publishing cartoons since 2011. Krimstein has published in Forbes Magazine, Forward, The New York Observer, among others, and has authored two books: Kvetch as Kvetch Can: Jewish Cartoons (2010) and The Three Escapes of Hannah Arendt (2018). In addition to his work as a writer and cartoonist, Krimstein is an advertising creative director and teaches at DePaul University, The School of the Art Institute of Chicago and YIVO Institute for Jewish Research.

== Works ==
=== When I Grow Up: Lost Autobiographies of Six Yiddish Teenagers ===
This 2021 graphic non-fiction work is based on six of the rescued Yiddish entries for a 1930's contest offered by the Vilna Ghetto's Paper Brigade, 40 members of the Yivo Library at that time. At the foot of many pages, Krimstein has included explanatory text for Yiddish expressions related to the Jewish tradition and experiences described in these selected entries. More information from this review published by The Forward: Ken Krimstein brings six Yiddish teenagers back to life (forward.com).

=== The Three Escapes of Hannah Arendt ===
Ken Krimstein published a graphic biography about the turbulent and prolific life of German-Jewish philosopher Hannah Arendt with Bloomsbury. Since its release in September 2018, the book received high praise and critical acclaim: Forbes and The Comics Journal selected it as one of the best graphic novels of 2018 and it was one of the finalists of the 2018 National Jewish Book Award. The book was featured in other media outlets such as The Guardian, the Chicago Reader, The New York Times and PEN American.

=== Einstein in Kafkaland ===
Einstein in Kafkaland: How Albert Fell Down the Rabbit Hole and Came Up with the Universe (2024) is about Albert Einstein and Franz Kafka, who both lived in Prague in 1911–1912.
