= Alex Marzano-Lesnevich =

American author and former lawyer

- Education: Columbia University (BA); Emerson College (MFA); Harvard Law School (JD)
- Occupations: Writer, professor
- Awards: Grand prix des lectrices de Elle (2019); Lambda Literary Award for Lesbian Memoir or Biography (2018); Chautauqua Prize (2018)

Alex Marzano-Lesnevich is an American author and former lawyer.

== Biography ==
Marzano-Lesnevich received their B.A. from Columbia University, M.F.A. from Emerson College, and J.D. from Harvard Law School. They were a three-time MacDowell fellow and 2023 United States Artists fellow.

Marzano-Lesnevich is the author of The Fact of a Body: A Murder and a Memoir, which received the 2018 Lambda Literary Award for Lesbian Memoir or Biography, the 2018 Chautauqua Prize, the 2019 Grand prix des lectrices de Elle in nonfiction, and was optioned by HBO to develop into a limited series.

The book recounts the unfolding effects of Marzano-Lesnevich being assigned as an intern to defend a pedophile and child murderer in Louisiana who killed and likely molested a six-year-old boy in 1992. Their faith in opposing the death penalty was shaken after watching the man's videotaped confession. The book is also a memoir of the intern reflecting on having been sexually abused as a child.

Marzano-Lesnevich is Assistant Professor and Rogers Communications Chair in Creative Non-Fiction at the University of British Columbia. They were previously an Assistant Professor of English at Bowdoin College. They write extensively about transgender issues.
