= The Sojourn =

2011 novel by Andrew Krivak

- First edition (publ. Bellevue Literary Press)
- Author: Andrew Krivak
- Language: English
- Publisher: Bellevue Literary Press
- Publication date: 2011
- Dewey Decimal: 813.54
- LC Class: PS3561.R569 S65

The Sojourn is a 2011 debut novel by Andrew Krivak which was shortlisted for the National Book Award for Fiction. The novel is a Family Saga which deals with American emigrant to Austria-Hungary, Jozef Vinich who gets dragged into World War I. Multiple reviewers compared the novel favourably to A Farewell to Arms.

== Reception ==
Reception of the novel was overwhelmingly positive. NPR reviewer Alan Cheuse called the novel "splendid", marking surprise that such a short novel can do such a good job examining the experience of the war. The Christian Science Monitor, similarly gave praise to the novel's simple language and compelling story telling, which effectively challenges the glorification of war, creating an "anti-war novel with all the heat of a just-fired artillery gun". Kirkus review noted that the novel is late to the World War I in literature genre, it's "an assured, meditative novel that turns on a forgotten theater in a largely forgotten war."
