= Våpensmia NM149 =

- Type: Sniper rifle
- Place of origin: Norway

Service history
- In service: 1988–2012
- Used by: Norway

Production history
- Designer: Våpensmia A/S
- Designed: 1985
- No. built: N/A
- Variants: NM149-F1

Specifications
- Mass: 5.6 kg (12.3 lb)
- Length: 1,120 mm (44.1 in)
- Barrel length: 600 mm (23.6 in)
- Cartridge: 7.62 × 51 mm NATO
- Action: Bolt action
- Rate of fire: N/A
- Muzzle velocity: 860-880 m/s
- Effective firing range: 800 m (875 yd)
- Feed system: 5-round magazine
- Sights: Schmidt & Bender 6×42 telescopic sight Simrad KN250 night scope AG-3 iron sight (NM149-F1 only)

The NM149 sniper rifle was developed by Våpensmia A/S in close cooperation with the Norwegian Army and is based on the tried and true Mauser M98 controlled feed bolt action. These actions originate from Mauser Karabiner 98k rifles left by German armed forces in Norway at the end of World War II in 1945. It is used by both the Norwegian military and police forces, though it was originally designed at the request of the Norwegian Army. The NM149 replaced the Kongsberg M59F1 in the Norwegian Army.

The NM149 stock is laminated beech veneer, pillar bedded and is adjustable for length of pull via a spacer system, the barrel is a German made cold-hammered barrel with 4 grooves right hand twist, of heavy contour and the system shoots very well. There was a problem with the early versions of the stock cracking, but that problem has since been solved. The rifles have an easily adjustable match quality trigger, but come from the factory with a pull weight of only 1.5 kg (3.3 lbs). The standard telescopic sight for the Norwegian military and police is a Schmidt & Bender 6×42, but the scope rings are basically NATO standard, and can be removed and replaced with rings which allow the mounting of other Western telescopic sights. They can also be removed entirely, and replaced with a mount allowing the use of most NATO-compatible night vision devices. The rifles were given the serial numbers of the Schmidt & Bender 6×42 telescopic sight to make a matching pair. The system was very capable and effective and served in the Norwegian army from 1988 to 2013. It was replaced in service by the Heckler & Koch HK417.

An improved model, the NM149-F1, has since been developed and produced. It has a better and stronger laminated and weatherproofed beech stock, and American heavy contour barrel (diameter 21mm) with a permanent front sight, and a flash suppressor from the AG-3 service rifle. The stock is not pillar bedded, which makes it somewhat more susceptible to weather changes. A bipod and suppressor can be fitted as needed.

== See also ==
- Bolt action
- Sniper rifle
