= Kongsberg Skiing Museum =

Museum in Kongsberg, Norway

Coordinates: 59°39′58″N 9°39′03″E

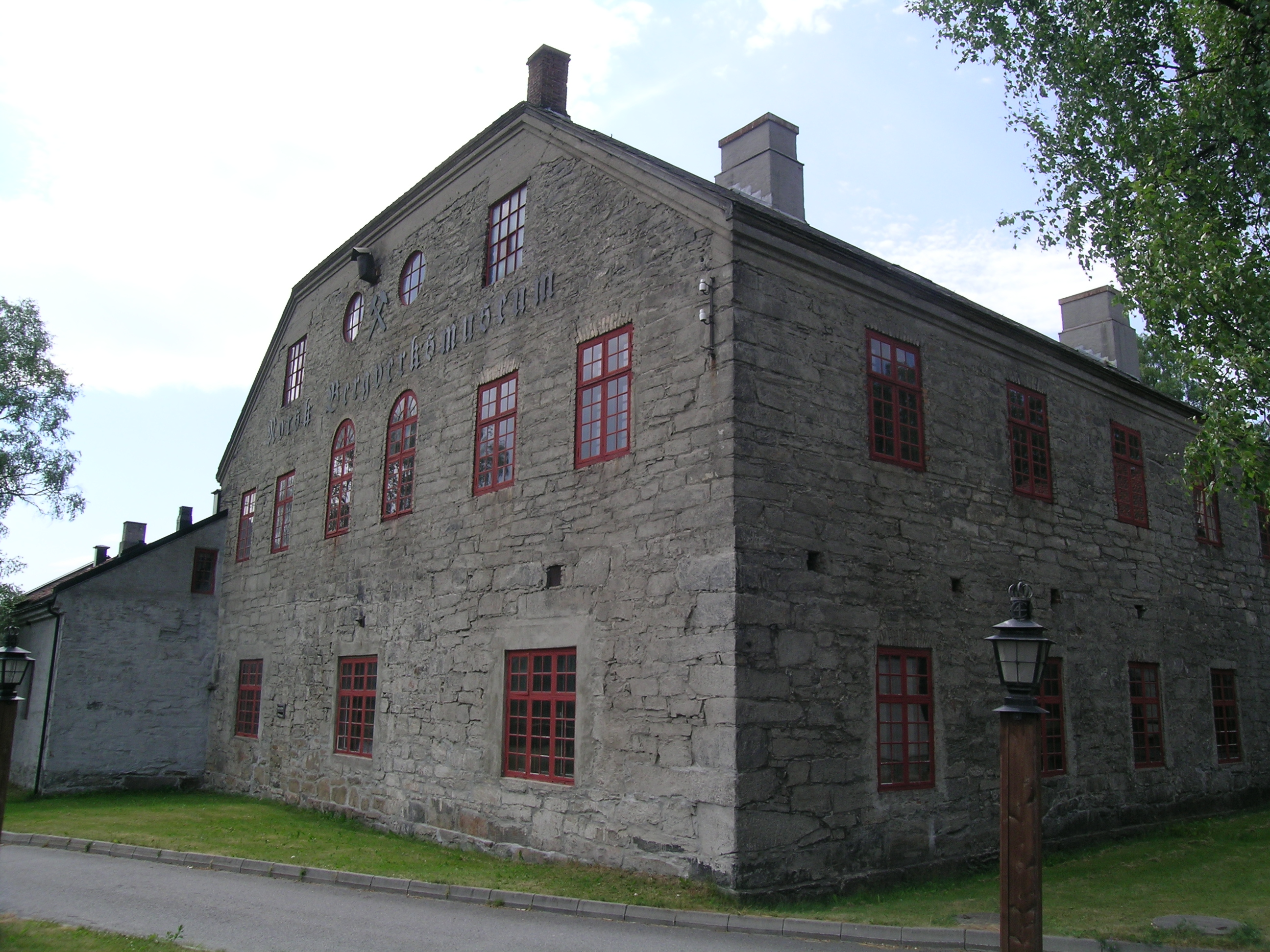
Former Kongsberg melting house, which now houses the Norwegian Mining Museum and the Kongsberg Ski Museum

Kongsberg Skiing Museum (Norwegian: Kongsberg Skimuseum) is a museum of skiing, located at Kongsberg in Buskerud, Norway.

It was initially created by two Olympic champion ski jumpers, Birger Ruud and Petter Hugsted. The museum focuses on the golden age of ski jumping in Norway, from 1924 to 1952, when jumpers from Kongsberg dominated ski jumping on the national as well as international level.

The museum collection documents skiing, ski equipment and ship production equipment from the late 1700s to around 1950. It also displays awards issued to skiers from Kongsberg. The museum is located in central Kongsberg, together with the Norwegian Mining Museum (Norsk Bergverksmuseum).
