= Olaf Hassel =

Norwegian astronomer

Olaf Hassel (12 May 1898 – 22 August 1972) was a Norwegian amateur astronomer. He was born in Øvre Sandsvær. He is known for his discoveries of the comet Jurlov-Achmarof-Hassel in April 1939 and the nova V446 Herculis on 7 March 1960. Hassel was born deaf.
