= Bonden =

Mountain in Buskerud, Norway

Highest point
- Elevation: 642 m (2,106 ft)
- Prominence: 81 m (266 ft)
- Parent peak: Blåfjell
- Isolation: 1.9 km (1.2 mi)
- Coordinates: 59°25′33″N 9°39′06″E

Geography
- Location: Buskerud, Norway

Bonden is a hill in Kongsberg Municipality in Buskerud county, Norway. It is located near the border with both Siljan Municipality and Skien Municipality which are in the neighboring Telemark county. The lake Mykle lies just northeast of the hill, about 23 kilometres (14 mi) south of the town of Kongsberg.

== Name ==
The name is the finite form of farmer (bonde), so the literal meaning is the farmer.

== See also ==
- List of mountains of Norway by height
