= Iver Heltzen =

Norwegian priest and naturalist

Iver Ancher Heltzen (4 March 1785 – 30 June 1842) was a Norwegian priest, naturalist, and an author on topographical-economical topics.

== Biography ==
Iver Ancher Heltzen was born in Kongsberg in Buskerud county. He was the son of Christian Ernst Heltzen (1745-1825) and his wife Anne Christine von Haxthausen (1743-1815). His Grand uncle was Michael Heltzen, director of the Kongsberg Silver Mines. In 1814, he married Christence Elisabeth Dass (1796-1877).

He was educated in University of Copenhagen, graduating in theology in 1809. He spent his professional career in Nordland, first as chaplain in Rana and from 1814 as pastor at Hemnes Church.

He was the author of several scientific and sociological papers. In particular, he was interested in plants and herbs for medical use. In 1841 started the science magazine Almue-Magazin for Nordlændinge

== Selected works ==
- Bidrag til en rigtigere Kundskab om Øen Tren (1823)
- Førsøg til Helgelands Flora efter Rafn’s, Funkes, Hornemans, Strøms og Bomares Værker (1828)
- Forsøg til en kort Anviisning for Nordlandenes Beboere til at samle, bruge og anvende medicinske og oeconomisk nyttige Planter (1831)
- Forsøg til Physisk og Oeconomisk Beskrivelse over Ranens Præstegjeld i Nordlandene (1834)
