= V446 Herculis =

1960 Nova event in the constellation Hercules

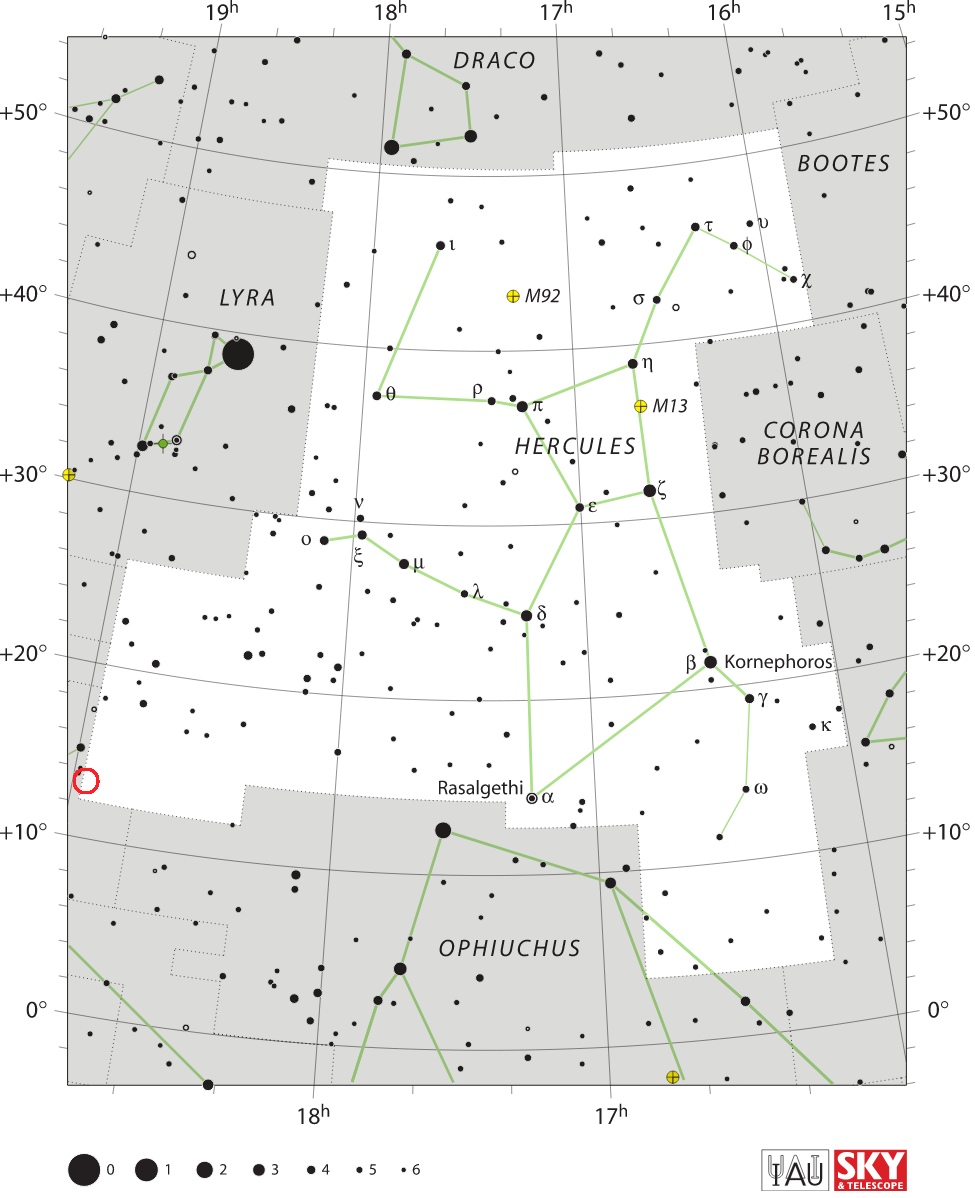
- Location of V446 Hercules (circled in red)

Observation data Epoch J2000.0 Equinox ICRS
- Constellation: Hecules
- Right ascension: 18^{h} 57^{m} 21.59^{s}
- Declination: +13° 14′ 29.3″

Astrometry
Distance	1361+185 −100 pc

Characteristics
- Variable type: Nova, Dwarf Nova

Other designations
- V446 Her, Nova Her 1960, AAVSO 1852+13

Database references
SIMBAD	data

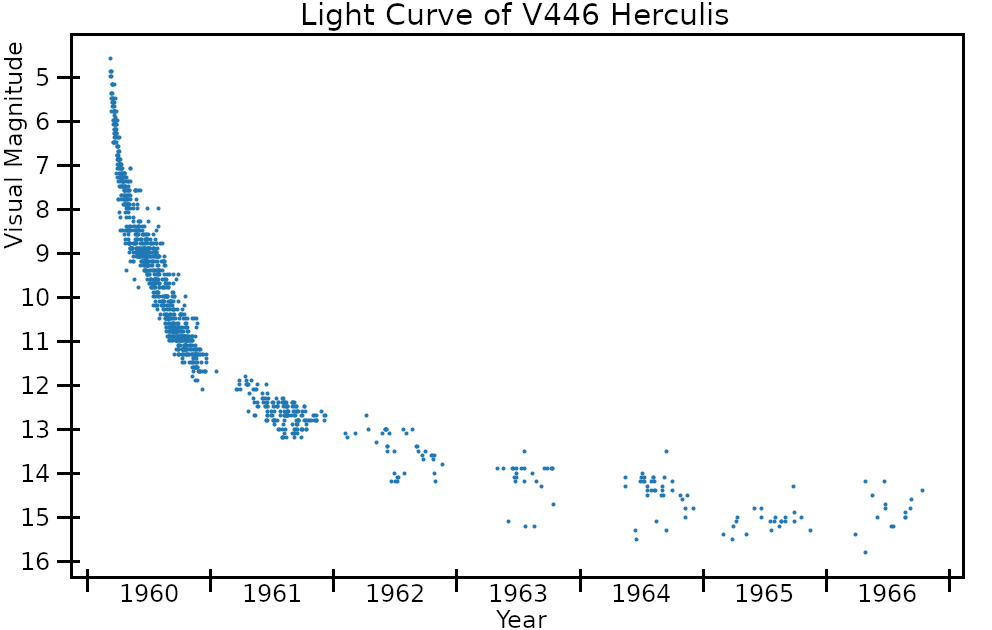
Visual band light curve of V446 Herculis, plotted using AAVSO data

V446 Herculis was a nova in the constellation Hercules in 1960. It reached magnitude 2.8. The nova was first observed by Olaf Hassel in the early morning hours of 7 March 1960, when it was a 5th magnitude star. Pre-discovery photographs showed that it was about three days past peak brightness, and had faded by 2 magnitudes during that time. The star was so near the border between the constellations of Hercules and Aquila that accurate measurements of its position were needed to determine which constellation contained it.

V446 Herculis was the first nova to have the degree of linear polarization of its light measured. It was determined that the polarization did not arise from the star itself.

Like all novae, V446 Herculis is a close binary star system with a "donor" star transferring matter to its white dwarf companion. In the case of V446 Herculis the donor star is a red dwarf and the pair's orbital period is 4.97 hours. Unlike many novae, V446 Herculis is not an eclipsing binary, but it does show dwarf nova outbursts every 13 to 30 days.
