= Ytre Sandsvær Municipality =

Former municipality in Norway

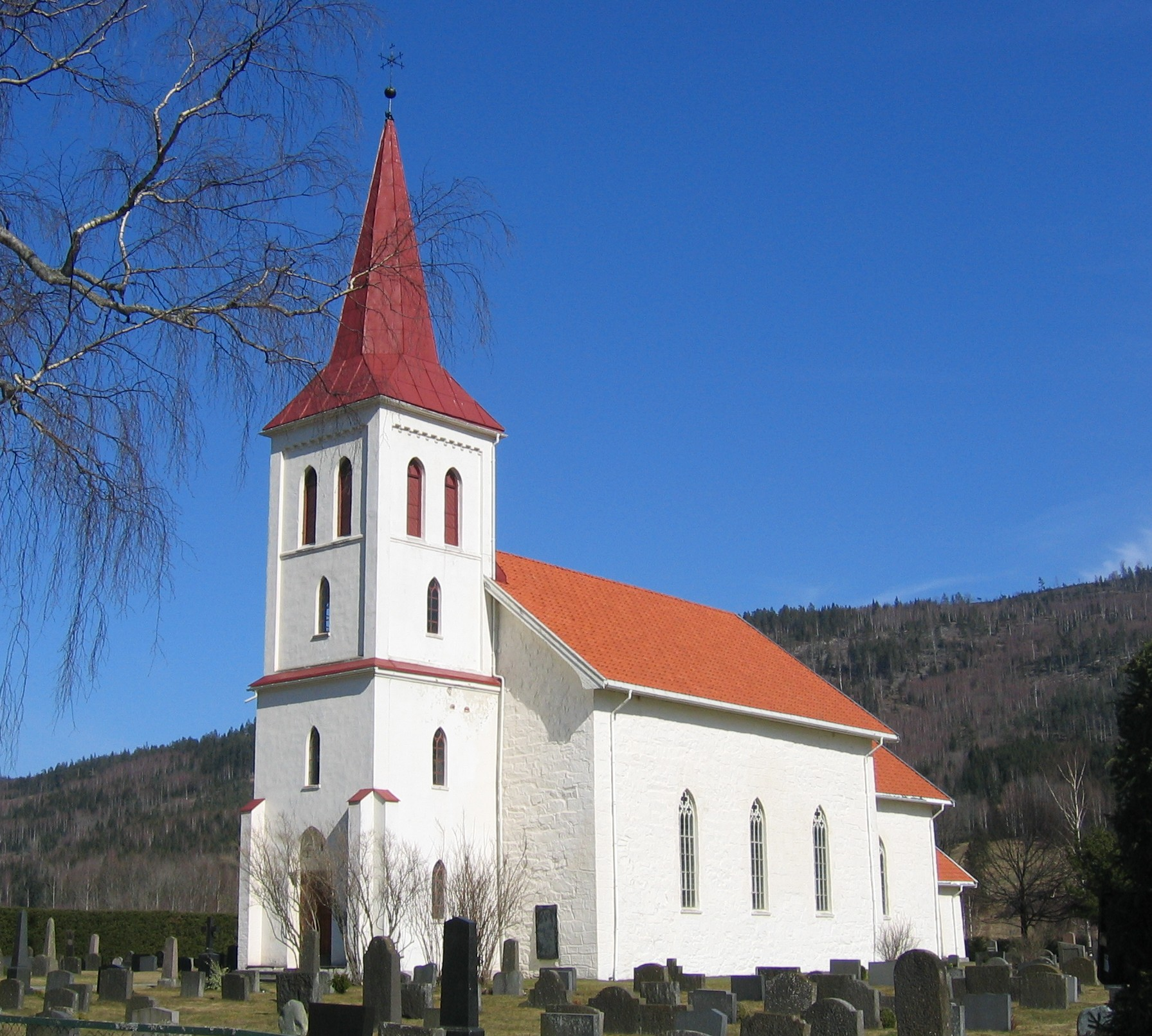
Efteløt Church in Ytre Sandsvær

Ytre Sandsvær is a former municipality in Buskerud county, Norway.

It was created when Sandsvær was split into Ytre and Øvre Sandsvær on 1 January 1908. At that time Ytre Sandsvær had a population of 3,245. On 1 January 1964 the two municipalities were incorporated into Kongsberg municipality. Prior to the merger Ytre Sandsvær had a population of 3,140.

Ytre Sandsvær in the site of Efteløt Church (Efteløt kirke) which is located in the village of Efteløt (59°33′03″N 9°48′35″E). The church was built in Romanesque architecture style and dates from approx. 1184. The church was constructed of natural stone up to 1 meter thick. The church was rebuilt into a more Gothic architecture style in 1876. Efteløt Church has 190 seats and was restored internally during 1953. Efteløt Church is in the Kongsberg Joint Parish Council of the Diocese of Tunsberg
