= Mykle =

Lake in Buskerud, Norway

- Møkle
- Interactive map of Mykle
- Location: Kongsberg Municipality, Buskerud
- Coordinates: 59.44158°N 9.67727°E
- Basin countries: Norway
- Max. length: 6.5 kilometres (4.0 mi)
- Max. width: 2.2 kilometres (1.4 mi)
- Surface area: 6 km^{2} (2.3 sq mi)
- Shore length^{1}: 23.75 kilometres (14.76 mi)
- Surface elevation: 421 metres (1,381 ft)
- References: NVE
- ^{1} Shore length is not a well-defined measure.

Mykle is a lake in Kongsberg Municipality in Buskerud county, Norway. The lake lies at the southernmost part of Buskerud county, just north of the border with Siljan Municipality in Telemark county, about 23 kilometres (14 mi) south of the town of Kongsberg.

Mykle is located to the northeast of the Bonden mountain. Mykle is part of the Siljan watershed (Norwegian: Siljanvassdraget) formed by rivers with headwaters at Skrimfjella which flow into Farris lake in Larvik Municipality. The watershed is developed with four power stations and was protected against further development in 1973. Mykle offers trout and perch fishing.

== See also ==
- List of lakes in Norway
