= C/1939 H1 (Jurlof–Achmarof–Hassel) =

Long-period comet

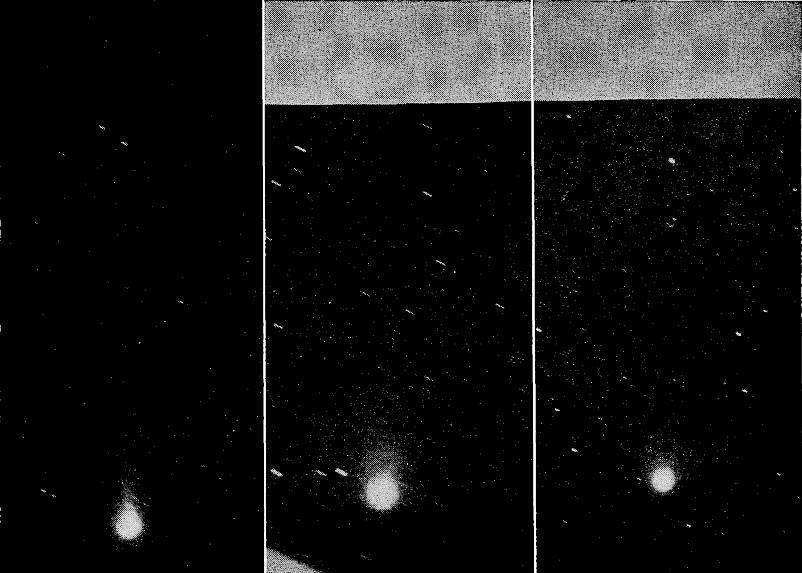
- The comet on 20, 23 and 25 April 1939 from the 24 inch reflector of the Yerkes Observatory.

Discovery
- Discovered by: Olaf Hassel; Achmarof; Jurlof
- Discovery date: 15 April 1939

Designations
- Alternative designations: 1939 III, 1939d

Orbital characteristics
- Epoch: 7 May 1939 (JD 2429390.5)
- Observation arc: 28 days
- Number of observations: 14
- Aphelion: 124 AU
- Perihelion: 0.528 AU
- Semi-major axis: 62 AU
- Eccentricity: 0.9915
- Orbital period: 490 years
- Inclination: 138.17°
- Longitude of ascending node: 312.35°
- Argument of periapsis: 89.15°
- Last perihelion: 10 April 1939
- T_{Jupiter}: -0.586
- Earth MOID: 0.013 AU

Physical characteristics
- Mean radius: 0.948 km (0.589 mi) (Note: Calculated mean radius using the formula: $\log_{10}\,(\,R\,)\ =\;0.9 +\;0.13 (\,H\,)$ Where $\,H\,$ is the comet's absolute total magnitude (M1))
- Comet total magnitude (M1): 7.1
- Apparent magnitude: 3.0 (1939 apparition)

C/1939 H1 (Jurlof–Achmarof–Hassel) is a long-period comet discovered on 15 April 1939. The comet was discovered by many observers independently but the first reports were those of Olaf Hassel, Achmarof, and Jurlof. The comet had a magnitude of 3 upon discovery.

== Observational history ==
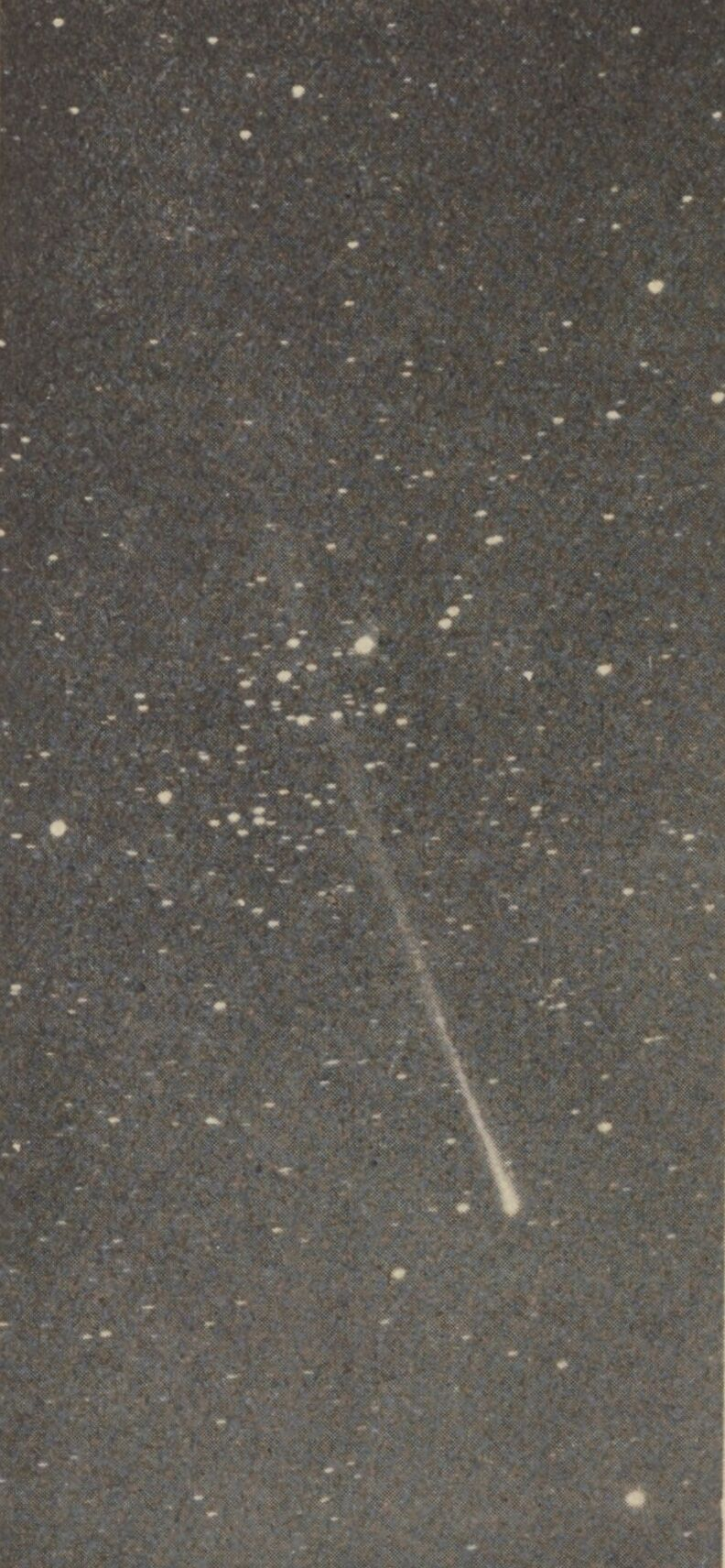
The comet on 21 April 1939, with the constellation of Perseus photographed by Ferdinand Quénisset.

The comet was discovered by many observers independently. The first report to reach astronomical authorities was that those of O. Hassel, who found the comet on the evening of April 16 from Hokksund, Norway. On April 20, Sergey Belyavsky announced that he received reports of the comet from amateur astronomers Achmarof and Jurlof, who found the comet independently in the evening of April 15. The comet then was near its closest approach to Earth, at a distance of 0.68 AU, and five days past perihelion. It was at a solar elongation of 31°.

On April 18 the apparent magnitude of the comet was estimated to be between 3 and 4. Vinter Hansen described the comet as big and diffuse with a tail. The comet visually had a tail about 1 degree long visually while in photographs the tail extended for 16 degrees. On 20 April the comet reached its northern most declination at +44°. U. S. Lyons reported that the comet was visible with naked eye. On April 21 the mean apparent magnitude of the comet was 4, with the tail extending photographically for 8.5°. However, the next day Waterfield mentioned that the tail had nearly disappeared. On May 1 the apparent magnitude of the comet was reported to be 5 visually and 5.8 photographically.

The comet reached its maximum solar elongation of 43° on 4 May. At that day the magnitude was given to be between 5.6 and 6.5. On 7 May the comet had a photographic magnitude of 6, a coma about 3 arcminutes across and its tail was extending for 2.7 degrees. By May 20 the comet had faded to magnitude 7.5–7.8. The comet was last detected on May 27 by H. Hirose at Tokyo Observatory, when it was at low latitude.

== Meteor showers ==
The comet has a long period, which is estimated to be 490 years based on 14 observations with a total observation arc of 28 days while an orbit calculated from 399 positions has an orbital period of 6,490 years. The comet has a minimum orbit intersection distance with Earth of 0.013 AU (1.9 million km; 1.2 million mi) and V. Guth noticed in 1939 that the orbit of comet approached the orbit of the Earth both in the ascending and the descending node, on 4 August and 31 January and suggested that the comet could produce meteors.

One meteor shower has been associated with comet Jurlof–Achmarof–Hassel, the theta Cetids (IAU shower #535), named from theta Ceti, which lies near its radiant point. The shower was first identified in 2014 and meteors associated with it have been observed in all years from 2010 and 2020, without any outbursts. About a dozen meteors were observed in cameras all over the world in 2019 and in 2020. The shower is active between 3 and 8 August, along with the Perseids.

The other shower associated with this comet has been named 47 Ophiuchids, and is active from January 31 to February 13. Three meteors associated with this shower were detected by the Croatian Meteor Network and the SonotaCo Meteor Network between 2007 and 2013.
