= Kongsberg Silver Mines =

Mining operation in Kongsberg, Norway

Coordinates: 59°37′45″N 9°35′28″E

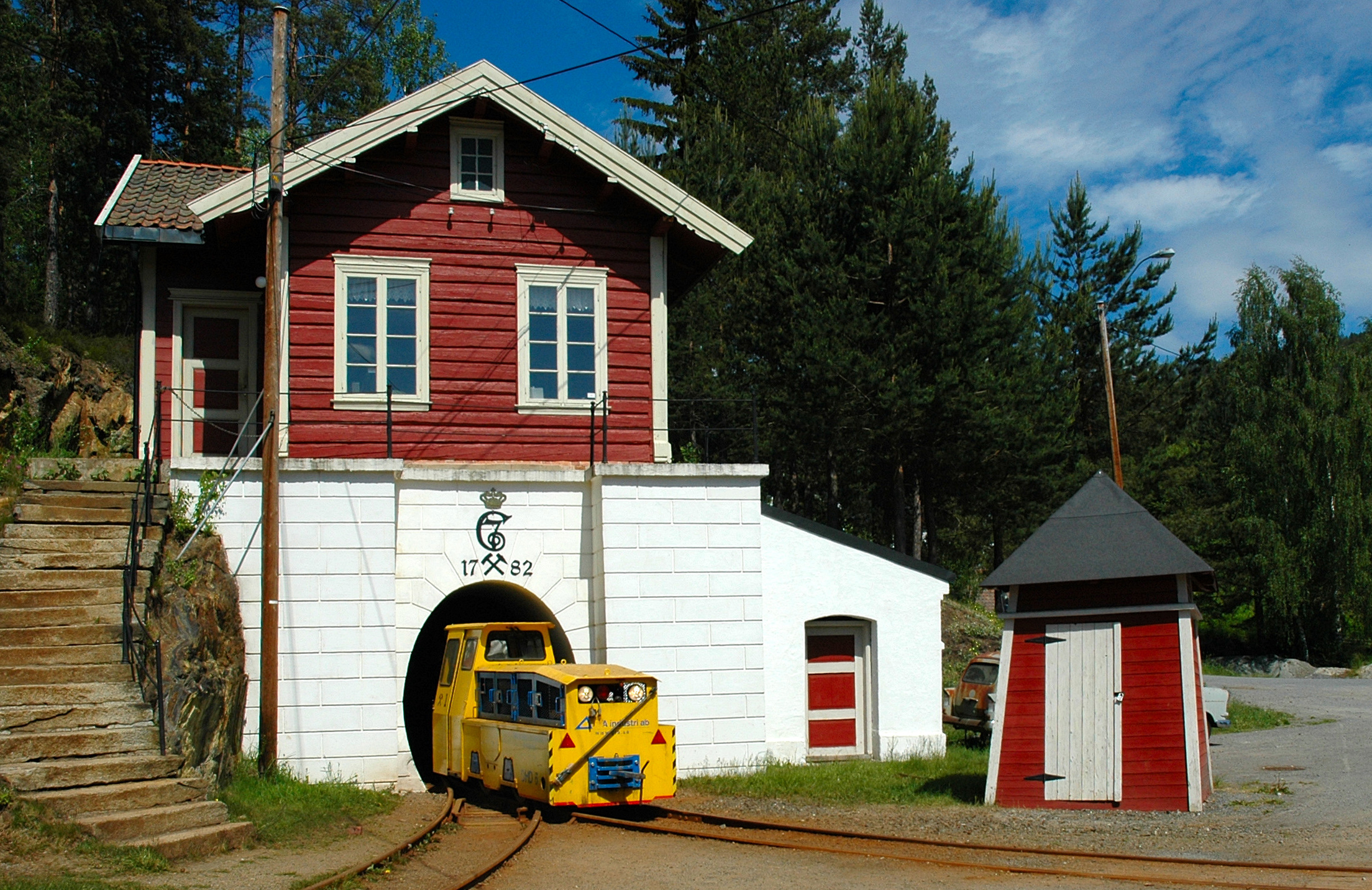
Entrance of King's Mine, Kongsberg

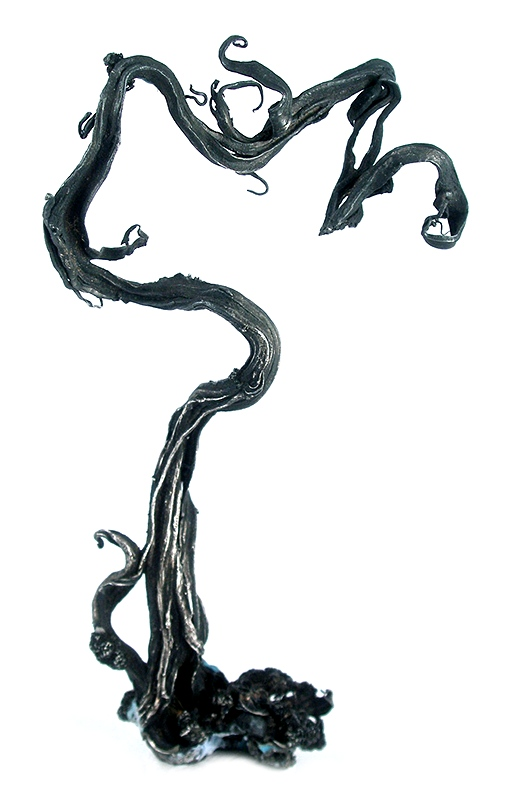
Kongsberg, Norway acanthite-silver

Kongsberg Silver works (Kongsberg Sølvverk) was a mining operation at Kongsberg in Buskerud county in Norway. The town of Kongsberg is the site of the Norwegian Mining Museum (Norsk Bergverksmuseum).

== History ==
Operating from over 80 different sites, Kongsberg silver mines constituted the largest mining field in Norway. It was the largest pre-industrial working place in Norway, with over 4,000 workers at its peak in the 1770s and supplied over 10% of the gross national product of the Danish–Norwegian union during its 335-year-long history: over 450,000 man-years were expended in the production. The silver mines in Kongsberg were in operation from 1623 until 1958. Total production exceeded 1,3 million kg silver.

Silver was first discovered between the 1 July and 5 July 1623, according to the somewhat romanticized story, which tells of two small children - Helga and Jacob - who were out shepherding their cattle at the top of Gruveåsen hill. They had an ox with them which scraped on the side of the mountain. They could see something shining and glimmering, and they picked it up and took it home to their father. Recognizing it as silver and quite valuable, he melted it and brought it to the town of Skien in Telemark county to sell it. In Skien he was arrested, the police finding it suspicious that someone would attempt to sell silver at such a low price. Being convinced that he was a thief, he was given the choice between telling where he had found the silver, or being sentenced to hard labour. He chose to tell the authorities he had found the silver in Southern Sandsvær, which was the old name for Kongsberg.

But silver mining in Gruveåsen had been established well before then, and was referred to as the Argenti Fodinæ (Latin for "The Silver Mines") in a source from 1532, Jacob Ziegler's book about Scandinavia. In 1539, a silver mining venture proper had been started by Christian III's with imported expert German miners. At the time, the newly discovered sea route to India and the Far East had prompted a scramble to search for silver to finance trade, but the Gruveåsen mines were then shut in the first half of the 1540s when the price of silver fell sharply due to large amounts of silver flowing from Spanish Latin America. The price of silver eventually recovered in the latter half of the 16th century on increased demand for currency to pay for luxury goods from China, where the Portuguese built Macau in 1555, and the Far East. So, when admiral Ove Gjedde returned from a long journey 1618-1622 from Ceylon and India where he had established a trading outpost at Trankebar, now Tharangambadi, on the Coromandel Coast of south-eastern India, as part of Christian IV's plans to build a Danish East India Company, Gjedde was sent to Norway to develop the mining industry. And it was Gjedde who re-started silver mining in the area proper in 1623, which in the following year, when King Christian IV came to Norway to visit and also founded the town of Kongsberg, by royal charter were formally established as Kongsberg Sølvverk. The King's Mine (Kongens gruve) was the largest mine at Kongsberg. The operation of the plant reached its peak in the 1770s when over 4,000 people were directly involved in the production. The 1750s, 1760s and 1770s were the heyday of the silverworks. Significant new ore discoveries were made, especially in the 1830s and 1860s. The particularly rich King's mine was operated to a depth of over 1,000 meters. The plant extracted silver right up until the closure in 1957.

== Norwegian Mining Museum ==
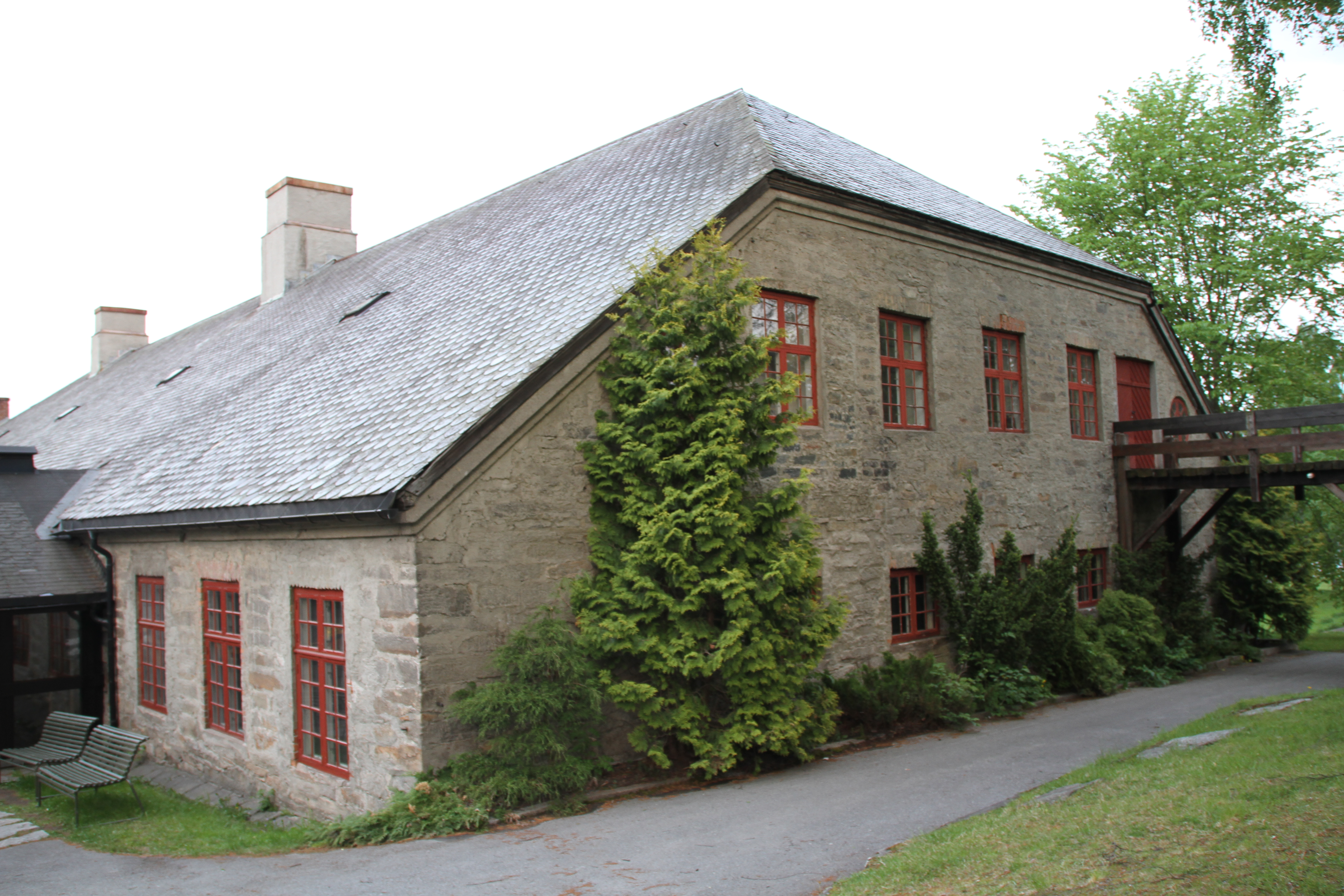
Norwegian Mining Museum

At Norwegian Mining Museum in Kongsberg, visitors can board the mining train which takes them through the 2,300 metres of the Christian VII Adit. The bottom of the mine is 1,070 metres below the surface, which corresponds to 560 metres below sea level. Since its closure in 1957, the silver mine has been preserved. Some 40,000 visit the museum annually. The tour includes the first man engine in Kongsberg in action. The room now known as the Banquet Hall of the King's Mine was originally intended as an emergency storage space for the National Archives of Norway, constructed in 1943 and held 2,000 shelf-metres of documents and books.

== Other Sources ==
- Helleberg, Odd Arne (2000) Kongsberg sølvverk 1623–1958: kongenes øyensten – rikenes pryd (Kongsberg : Sølvverkets venner) ISBN 82-7494-033-4
- Sølvverkets virkelige historie må fram før 400-års jubileet: https://www.laagendalsposten.no/meninger/solvgruvene/historie/solvverkets-virkelige-historie-ma-fram-for-400-ars-jubileet/o/5-64-789908
