= Petter Hugsted =

Norwegian ski jumper (1921–2000)

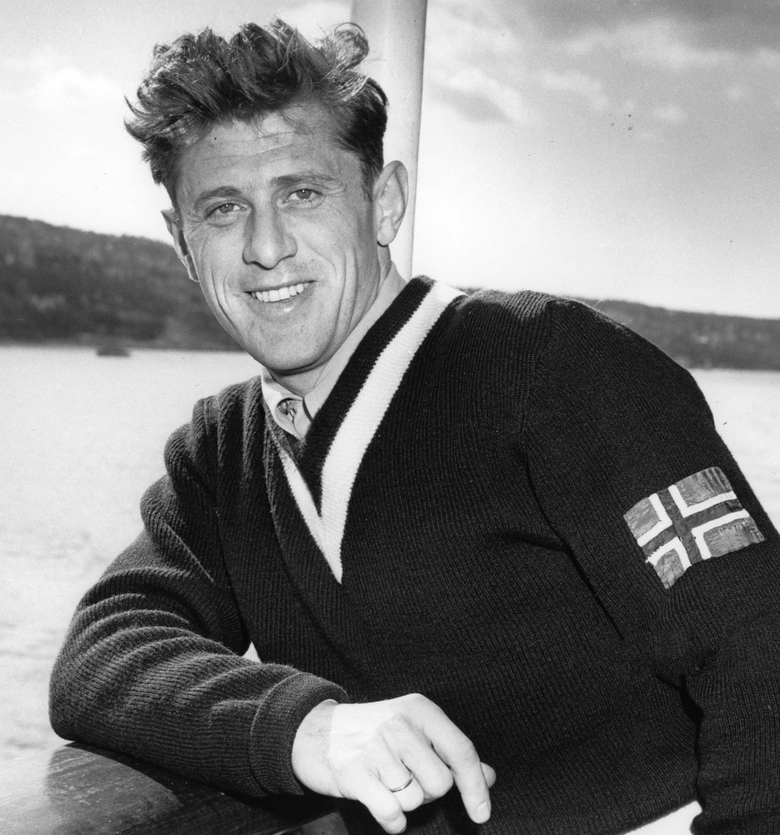
- Hugsted in 1950

Personal information
- Born: 11 July 1921 Kongsberg, Norway
- Died: 16 May 2000 (aged 78) Kongsberg, Norway

Sport
- Sport: Ski jumping
- Club: Kongsberg IF
Medal record
Representing Norway
Olympic Games
Gold medal – first place	1948 St. Moritz	Individual large hill
World Championships
Gold medal – first place	1948 St. Moritz	Individual large hill

Petter Hugsted (11 July 1921 – 16 May 2000) was a Norwegian ski jumper who won the gold medal in the individual large hill event at the 1948 Olympics.

Hugsted won junior competition at the Holmenkollen ski festival in 1940. His career was impeded during World War II, when he was held in the Grini concentration camp during the German occupation of Norway. After the war he placed third at the Holmenkollen in 1947 and 1948, in the senior category. He won the ski jumping competition at Lahti in 1947 and the Open U.S. Championships in Salt Lake City in 1949. He retired in 1951 after finishing 13th at Holmenkollen.

Besides skiing Hugsted played association football for the national B-team. He lived his whole life in Kongsberg, and devoted much energy to the creation and curatorship of the Kongsberg Skiing Museum, together with his friend and fellow ski jumper Birger Ruud.
