= Kongsberg =

Kongsberg Municipality Kongsberg kommune
- Municipality
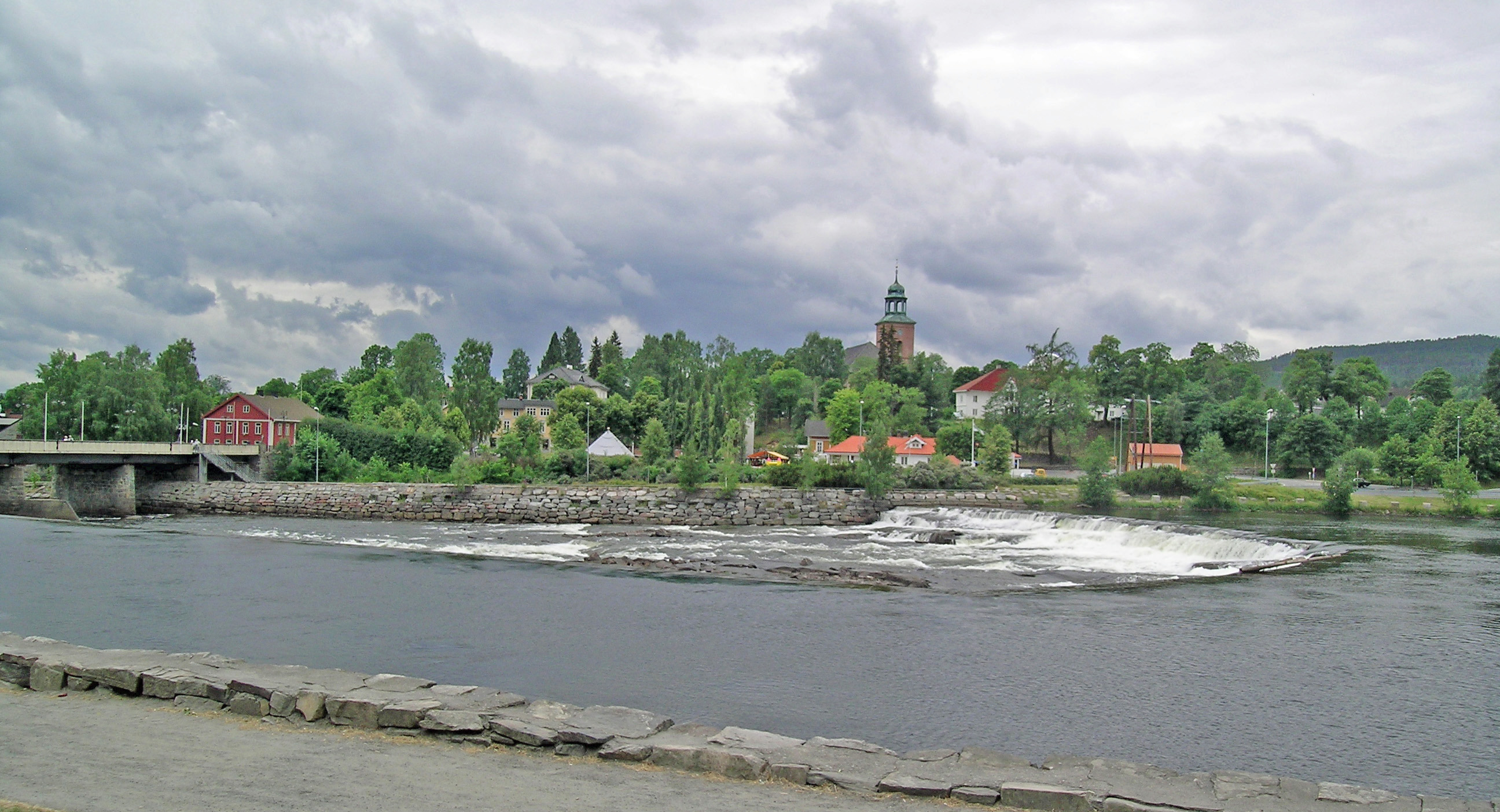
- Kongsberg in July 2006

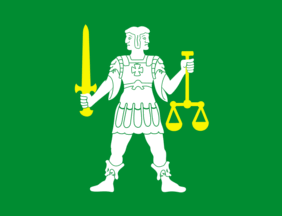
- Flag Coat of arms
- Nickname: Teknologibyen; The City of Technology
- Buskerud within Norway

- Kongsberg within Buskerud
- Coordinates: 59°40′10″N 09°39′06″E
- Country: Norway
- County: Buskerud
- District: Lower Buskerud
- Administrative centre: Kongsberg

Government
  - Mayor (2015): Kari Anne Sand (Sp)

Area
  - Total: 792 km^{2} (306 sq mi)
  - Land: 753 km^{2} (291 sq mi)
  - Rank: #138s in Norway

Population (2011)
  - Total: 25,090
  - Rank: #27 in Norway
  - Density: 31.2/km^{2} (81/sq mi)
  - Change (10 years): ▲ +8.9%
- Demonym(s): Kongsbering/ Kongsbergenser; Kongsbergensar

Official language
  - Norwegian form: Bokmål
- Time zone: UTC+01:00 (CET)
  - Summer (DST): UTC+02:00 (CEST)
- ISO 3166 code: NO-3303
- Website: Official website

Kongsberg (Norwegian pronunciation: [ˈkɔ̂ŋːsbær(ɡ)]) is a historical mining town and municipality in Buskerud county, Norway. The city is located on the river Numedalslågen at the entrance to the valley of Numedal. Kongsberg has been a centre of silver mining, arms production and forestry for centuries, and is the site of high technology industry including the headquarters of Norway's largest defence contractor Kongsberg Gruppen.

Kongsberg, formerly spelled Konningsberg (lit. "King's Mountain"), was developed as a mining city on the basis of the Kongsberg Silver Mines, founded by and named after King Christian IV of Denmark and Norway in 1624. The king invited German engineers and other specialists from Saxony and the Harz region to help build the mining company. As a mining city, Kongsberg had a distinct urban culture that contrasted with its surroundings, strongly influenced by the traditions of mining communities in Germany and where the German language was extensively used in mining business and for religious services. In the first years nearly half of the city's population were German immigrants, and the majority of the engineers and executives were German immigrants and their descendants well into the 19th century, becoming a distinct social class called mining families that formed the educated social elite of Kongsberg in contrast to the Norwegian farming population; the first Nobel laureate in economics Ragnar Frisch belonged to such a Kongsberg mining family. By the 18th century Kongsberg was Norway's second largest city, second only to Bergen. Kongsberg was one of Norway's two privileged mining cities and thus formed a special mining jurisdiction (Bergstad), and only became part of Buskerud county in 1760. On 1 January 1838, the new national law, creating local governments, made Kongsberg a municipality. The rural municipalities of Ytre Sandsvær and Øvre Sandsvær were merged into the municipality of Kongsberg in 1964. Kongsberg gradually lost importance to other cities in the 19th century, particularly to the rapidly growing capital of Christiania (Oslo).

The Kongsberg Silver Mines closed in 1958 after operating for 334 years and is today a museum and the city's main tourist attraction. Kongsberg remains the site of the Royal Norwegian Mint (Norwegian: Det Norske Myntverket), which mints Norwegian coins and also produces circulating and collectors' coins for other countries. Kongsberg is also the home of Norway's major defence contractor, Kongsberg Gruppen, founded in 1814. Two of its best-known products were the Kongsberg Colt and the Krag–Jørgensen rifle.

Both the University of South-Eastern Norway Kongsberg campus, and Tinius Olsen's school, a combined technical vocational college and secondary school, are located in Kongsberg.

== Minorities ==
Number of minorities (1st and 2nd generation) in Kongsberg by country of origin in 2017
Ancestry	Number
Poland	336
Lithuania	282
India	217
Sweden	211
Denmark	175
Afghanistan	164
Iraq	160
Iran	136
UK	127
Eritrea	118
Philippines	117
Germany	110

== History ==
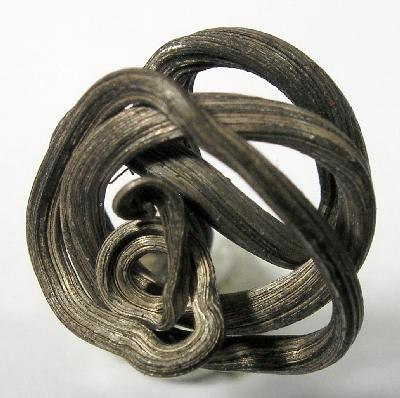
Classic Kongsberg wire-silver, collected in the 1980s. Size 1.4 cm × 1 cm × 0.9 cm (0.55 in × 0.39 in × 0.35 in)

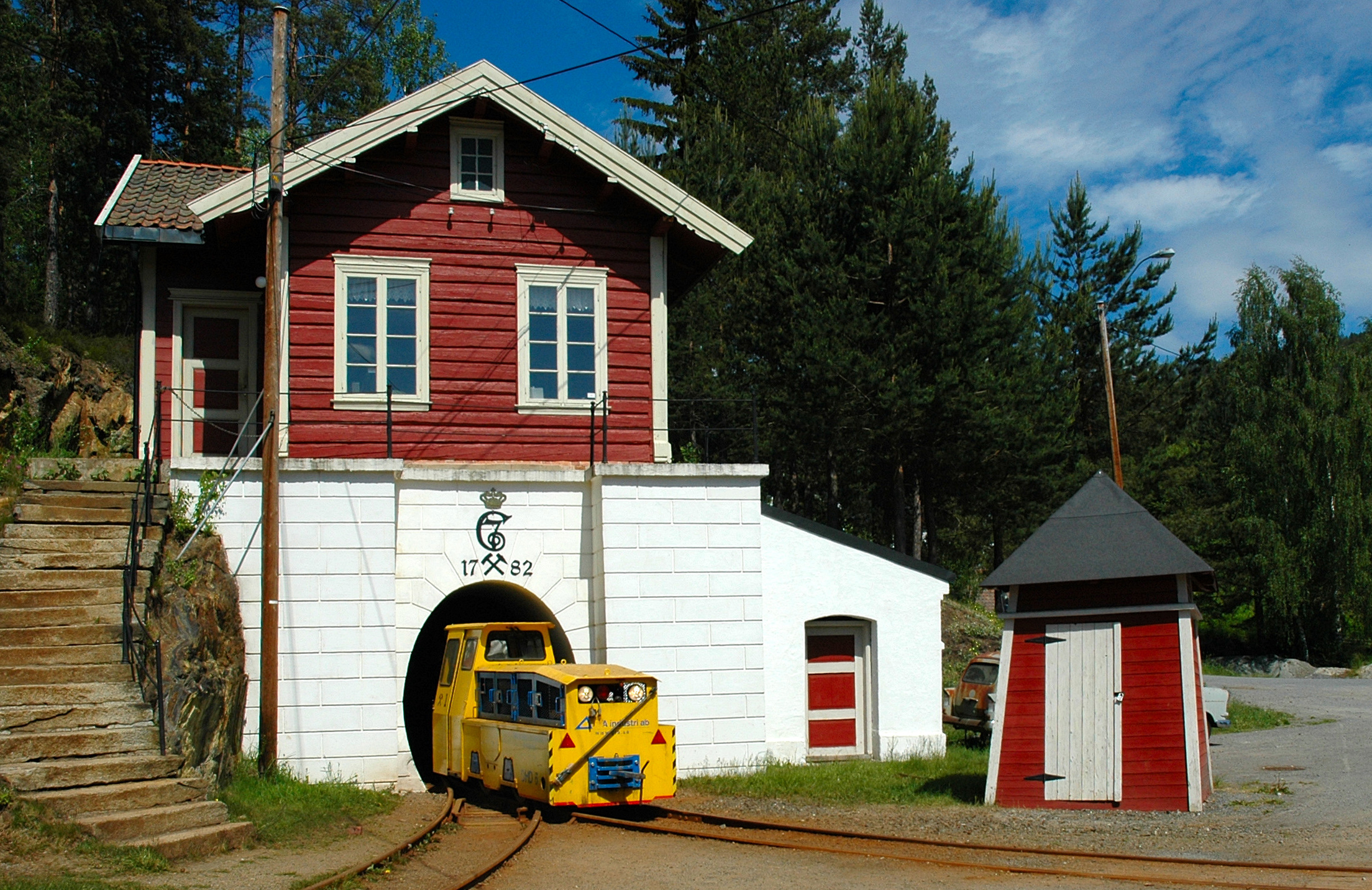
Entrance to Christian 7. Stoll.

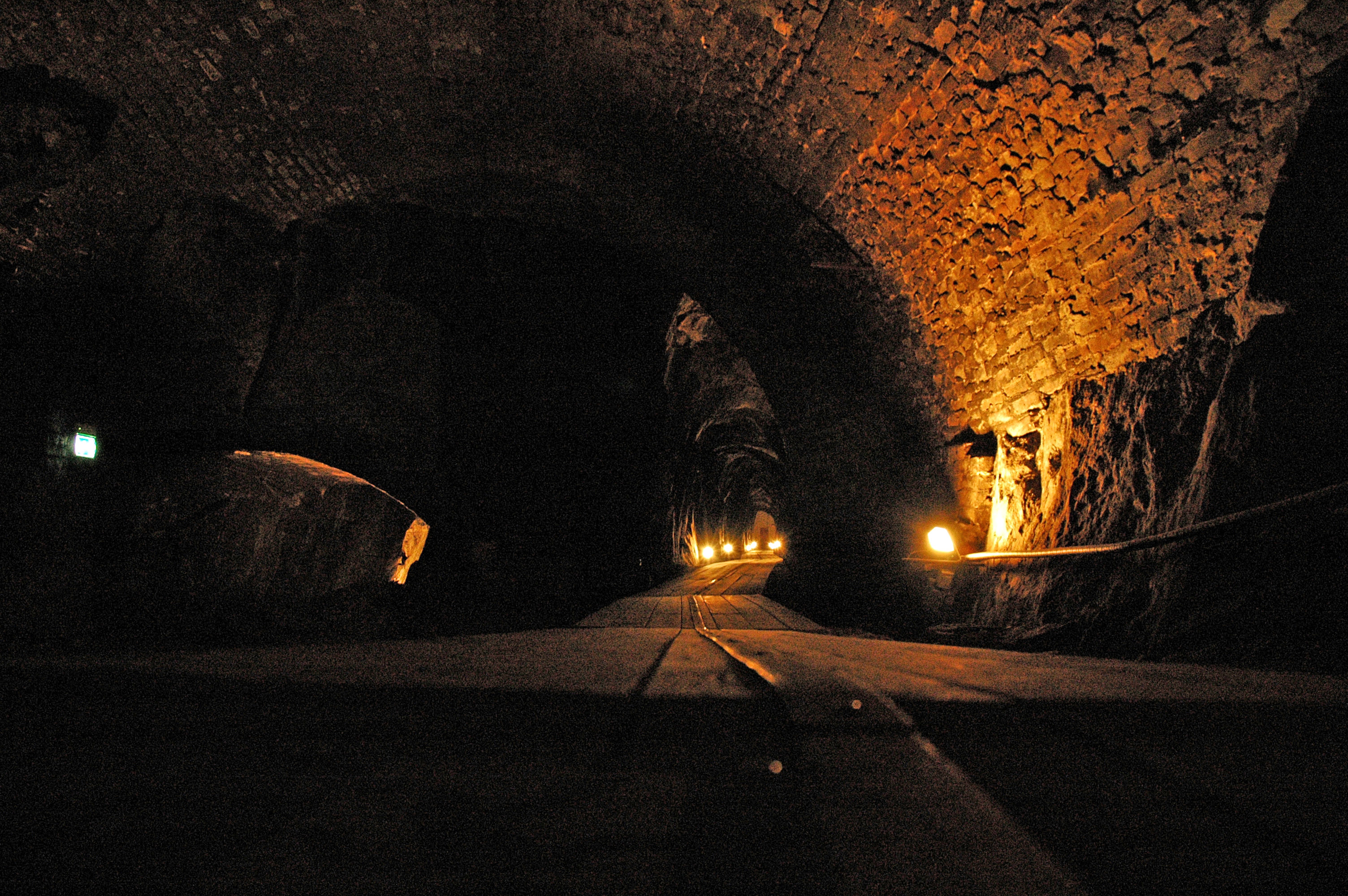
Inside the mines. Christian 7. Stoll (right), «skråplanet» (down to the left)

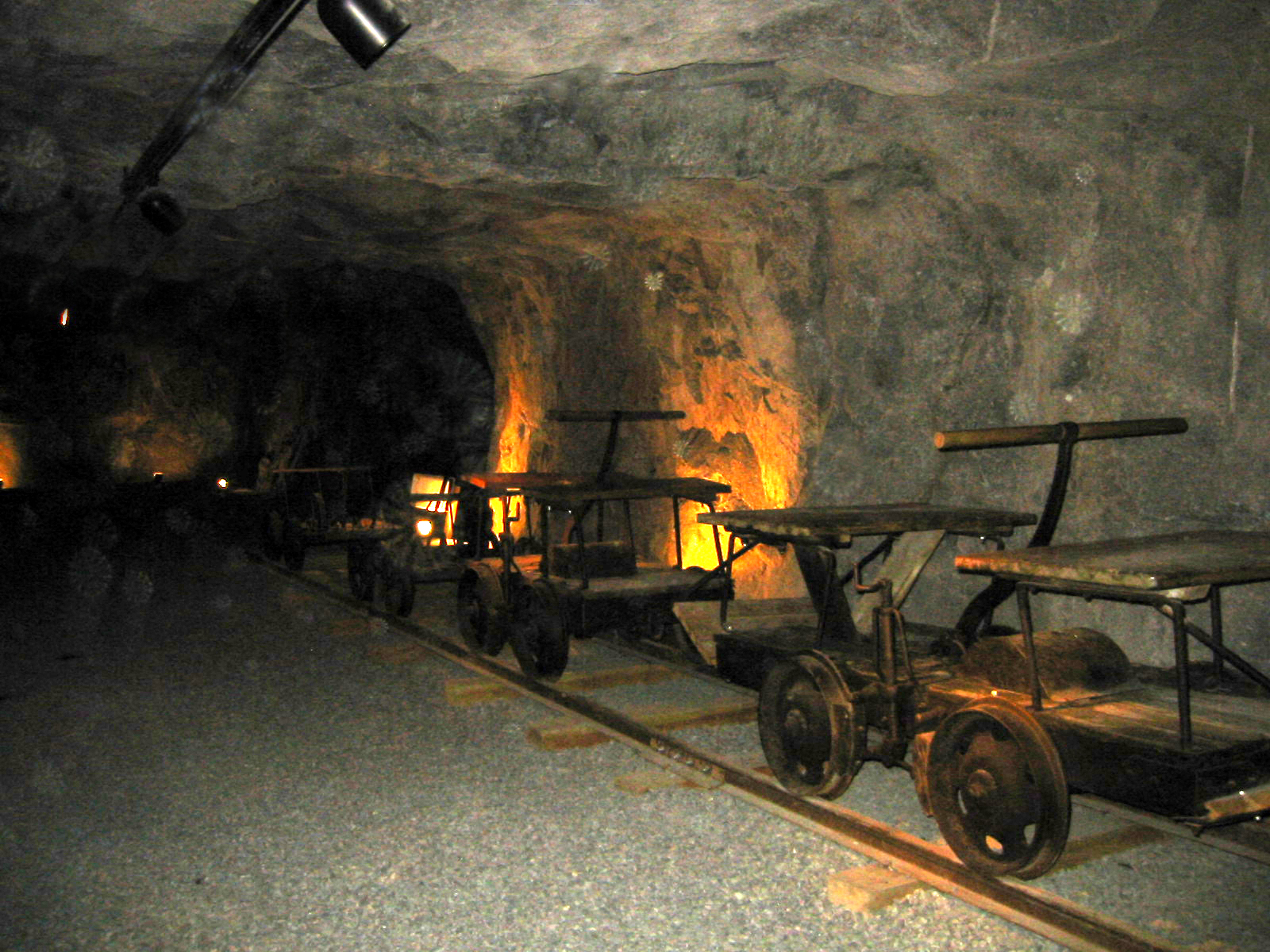
Kongsberg Silver Mines

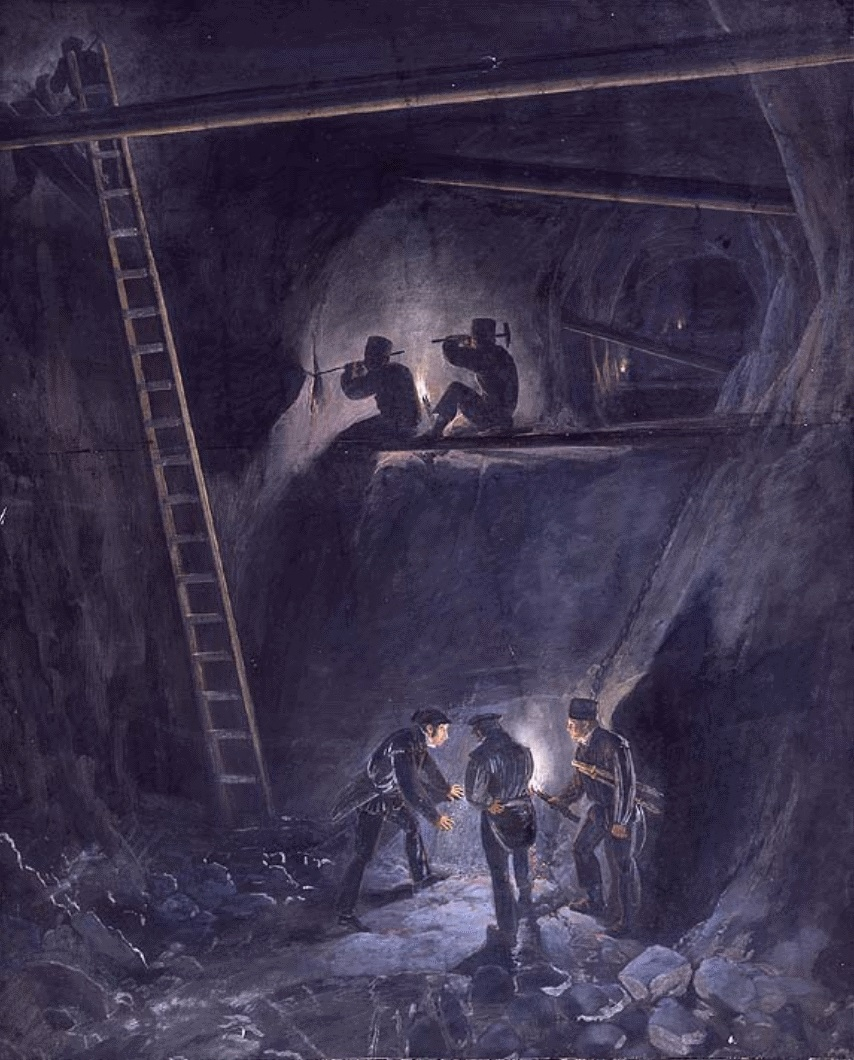
From Kings Mine, drawn by Johannes Flintoe in 1834, depicting the work of the Kongsberg mine.

Kongsberg was founded by Danish-Norwegian King Christian IV as a mining community in 1624 after the discovery of silver. In its second year, the town of Kongsberg and the Kongsberg Silver Mines began. According to official records, silver was first discovered by the shepherds children Helga Verp and Jacob Grosvold in the summer of 1623. However, the existence of deposits of precious metals was known previously, as evidenced by indications of earlier silver mining. With the rise of silver mining, Kongsberg became the largest industrial center in Norway before the industrial revolution. At the peak of silver mining in the early eighteenth century, Kongsberg's silver mines and related industries contributed 10% of the Denmark–Norway gross national product.

To develop the Kongsberg Silver Mines, Christian IV hired Germans from the silver mines of Saxony and Harz and brought in Germans from other mines in Norway. The Germans brought their knowledge of mining technology, especially important during the start-up phase. Before 1623, the city was located in the royal territory of Sandsvær.

Four years after the establishment of the Kongsberg Silver Mines, most of the 1,500 workers and officials were still German. Gradually, Norwegians entered the workforce and were hired as supervisors. In 1636, 1,370 Germans and 1,600 Norwegians were employed there. In 1648, there were 1,500 Germans and 2,400 Norwegians working in Kongsberg.

Gunpowder was officially introduced in mining in 1681. Mining in the particularly hard rock of Kongsberg Mountain was energy intensive, so the silver mine continued to develop new technology to reduce production costs. A large artificial dam powered the mine's hoists before electricity was introduced. In 1624, a road from Hokksund to Kongsberg was built to serve the Kongsberg Silver Mines, the most important road built in Norway in the 17th century. In 1665, the road was extended to Kristiansand and Larvik.

By 1683, the mining industry was an important industry of the state. The rapid development of Kongsberg meant that the number of workers in the city had increased significantly by the end of the 17th century. The proportion of Norwegians in the workforce increased, but for a long time, the main staff was dominated by Germans. Kongsberg was almost an outpost of Germany in Norway: the mine had a German name, and the official language was German, only later becoming bilingual (German and Danish). In Kongsberg, the German mountain justice system was also used. Legally, this means that the city was bound by independent regulations, partially separating the mining community from the country's legal system. The Germans brought with them the Knappschaft, a guild-like association of miners that provided including free medical assistance, a pension plan, worker sick leave and a Saturday break. The ring agriculture characteristic of Kongsberg may also have been inspired by the German pattern.

The proceeds from silver mining provided a valuable assistance to the tight finances of Denmark. Denmark–Norway relied heavily on the silver of Kongsberg to support an ongoing war against Sweden. Precious metals also became more and more important in the currency, and to get closer to its source of raw materials, the Royal Mint moved in 1686 from Akershus to Kongsberg. During the Great Northern War in 1716, the city became the main target of Karl XII's foray into Norderhof.

Kongsberg was particularly known for its Kongsberg Silver Mines and their high purity. Kongsberg's ore also contained a certain amount of gold and large amounts of copper, cobalt, lead-zinc and fluorite. Roughly 15,750 tonnes (34,720,000 lb) of silver was extracted between the discovery of the silver ore seams in 1623 and the last year of mining in 1957. The workforce at the Kongsberg silver mine began to increase substantially at the end of the 17th century. In the 1769 census, the mines employed about 4,000 workers. With 8,000 inhabitants in all, the town was the second largest in Norway, after Bergen (and thus larger than today's capital, Oslo).

In Norway's 1749 census, Kongsberg was the most populous town in Eastern Norway. It was granted its royal charter of trade—amounting to official township—in 1802. Following several hard years with reduced silver output from the mines, the war of 1807–1814, and a severe town fire in 1810 where 56 houses on the west side were destroyed, mining was complemented by the government establishing a defense industry in 1814. By 1835, the population had declined to 3,540.

Kongsberg is home to the Royal Norwegian Mint (Norwegian: Det Norske Myntverket), which mints Norwegian coins and also produces circulating and collectors' coins for other countries such as Israel. It was established in 1686, and was renamed from the Royal Norwegian Mint (Norwegian: Den Kongelige Mynt) in 2004 after having been sold to private investors (the Mint of Finland and Norwegian company Samlerhuset) in 2003. Kongsberg is also the site of the Kongsberg School of Mines (Kongsberg Bergseminar), an academic institution for mining technology which operated from 1757 to 1814.

During peaceful times, the defence industry gradually evolved into many other kinds of high tech activities as well, now dominating the town's employment. In 1987, however, the state-owned Kongsberg Weapons Factory (Kongsberg Vaapenfabrikk) suffered a major financial crisis as well as accusations of breaching the CoCom rules by selling sensitive technology to the Soviet bloc. As a result, the company was split into several smaller units and partly sold to private investors. Today, the separate firms thrive as one of Norway's main high-tech industrial clusters, centering on the defence and maritime company Kongsberg Gruppen which is listed on the Oslo Stock Exchange.

On 13 October 2021, a man stabbed multiple people with a bladed weapon, killing five and injuring three. Police subsequently apprehended a suspect.

== Coat-of-arms ==
The coat-of-arms is from modern times and was designed by Hallvard Trætteberg. They were granted on 25 August 1972. They are based upon the old seal for the city from 1689 which shows the Roman god Janus dressed as an emperor (to represent the king); the sword and the pair of scales represents justice. The colour green represents the forests, silver represents the mountains, and gold represents wealth.

== Geography ==
Kongsberg is located at the mouth of the valley Numedal; farther to the South the valley is called Lågendalen.

Flesberg Municipality is located to the north; Øvre Eiker Municipality and Holmestrand Municipality are to the east; Larvik Municipality, Siljan Municipality, and Skien Municipality are to the south; and Midt-Telemark Municipality and Notodden Municipality are to the west. Of these, the two first lie in Buskerud county like Kongsberg, while Holmestrand and Larvik lie in Vestfold county, and the others lie in Telemark county. The town is divided by the river Numedalslågen, which has three waterfalls in the town itself.

== Climate ==
Kongsberg has a humid continental climate (Dfb), with late summer and autumn as the wettest season and February – April as the driest season. Kongsberg has warm summers by Norwegian standards; average daily highs in summer are comparable to Oslo. In winter Kongsberg is colder than Oslo, and snow cover on the ground is common. The largest snow depth recorded is 123 cm on 3 March 2006.The all-time high temperature 34.6 °C (94.3 °F) was recorded 19 June 1970, while 10 August 1975 recorded 34.5 °C (94.1 °F). The all-time low −32.5 °C (−26.5 °F) was recorded 3 January 1941. As pr January 2022, all monthly record lows are old, 11 from before 1950. All record highs are from after 1950, 5 of 12 from after 2000 (pr January 2022). Kongsberg has recorded 30 °C (86 °F) as early as 14 May (in 2000). The weather station Kongsberg brannstasjon has recorded since 2003, extremes includes data from Kongsberg II, III and IV.

Climate data for Kongsberg brannstasjon 1991–2020 (170 m, average highs/lows 2004-2025, extremes 1915–2020 also includes earlier stations)
Month	Jan	Feb	Mar	Apr	May	Jun	Jul	Aug	Sep	Oct	Nov	Dec	Year
Record high °C (°F)	14.2 (57.6)	16.7 (62.1)	20.5 (68.9)	26.2 (79.2)	30.1 (86.2)	34.6 (94.3)	32.9 (91.2)	34.5 (94.1)	28 (82)	24.6 (76.3)	15.9 (60.6)	13.8 (56.8)	34.6 (94.3)
Mean daily maximum °C (°F)	−0.9 (30.4)	1.3 (34.3)	6.2 (43.2)	11.7 (53.1)	17.1 (62.8)	21.1 (70.0)	23 (73)	21 (70)	16.9 (62.4)	9.9 (49.8)	4 (39)	−0.2 (31.6)	10.9 (51.6)
Daily mean °C (°F)	−4.2 (24.4)	−3.2 (26.2)	0.4 (32.7)	5.1 (41.2)	10.5 (50.9)	14.5 (58.1)	16.7 (62.1)	15.2 (59.4)	10.8 (51.4)	5 (41)	0.2 (32.4)	−3.8 (25.2)	5.6 (42.1)
Mean daily minimum °C (°F)	−7.6 (18.3)	−6.8 (19.8)	−4.1 (24.6)	−0.2 (31.6)	4.6 (40.3)	9 (48)	11.3 (52.3)	10 (50)	6.8 (44.2)	2 (36)	−2.2 (28.0)	−6.6 (20.1)	1.4 (34.4)
Record low °C (°F)	−32.5 (−26.5)	−29.3 (−20.7)	−25.3 (−13.5)	−16.9 (1.6)	−7.6 (18.3)	−1.1 (30.0)	2 (36)	0.3 (32.5)	−4.9 (23.2)	−14.1 (6.6)	−22 (−8)	−31.1 (−24.0)	−32.5 (−26.5)
Average precipitation mm (inches)	64.7 (2.55)	40.8 (1.61)	42.9 (1.69)	46.3 (1.82)	66.2 (2.61)	79.4 (3.13)	85.7 (3.37)	96.1 (3.78)	84.5 (3.33)	95.4 (3.76)	88.6 (3.49)	59.1 (2.33)	849.7 (33.47)
Source 1: Norwegian Meteorological Institute/yr.no
Source 2: Værogvind

== Transportation ==
The main highways are the E134, crossing Kongsberg east to west (and connected to the E18 to Oslo), and Norwegian national road 40 (Riksvei 40), going north to south. The Sørland Line stops at Kongsberg Rail Station, with connection to local and regional bus lines.

== Culture ==
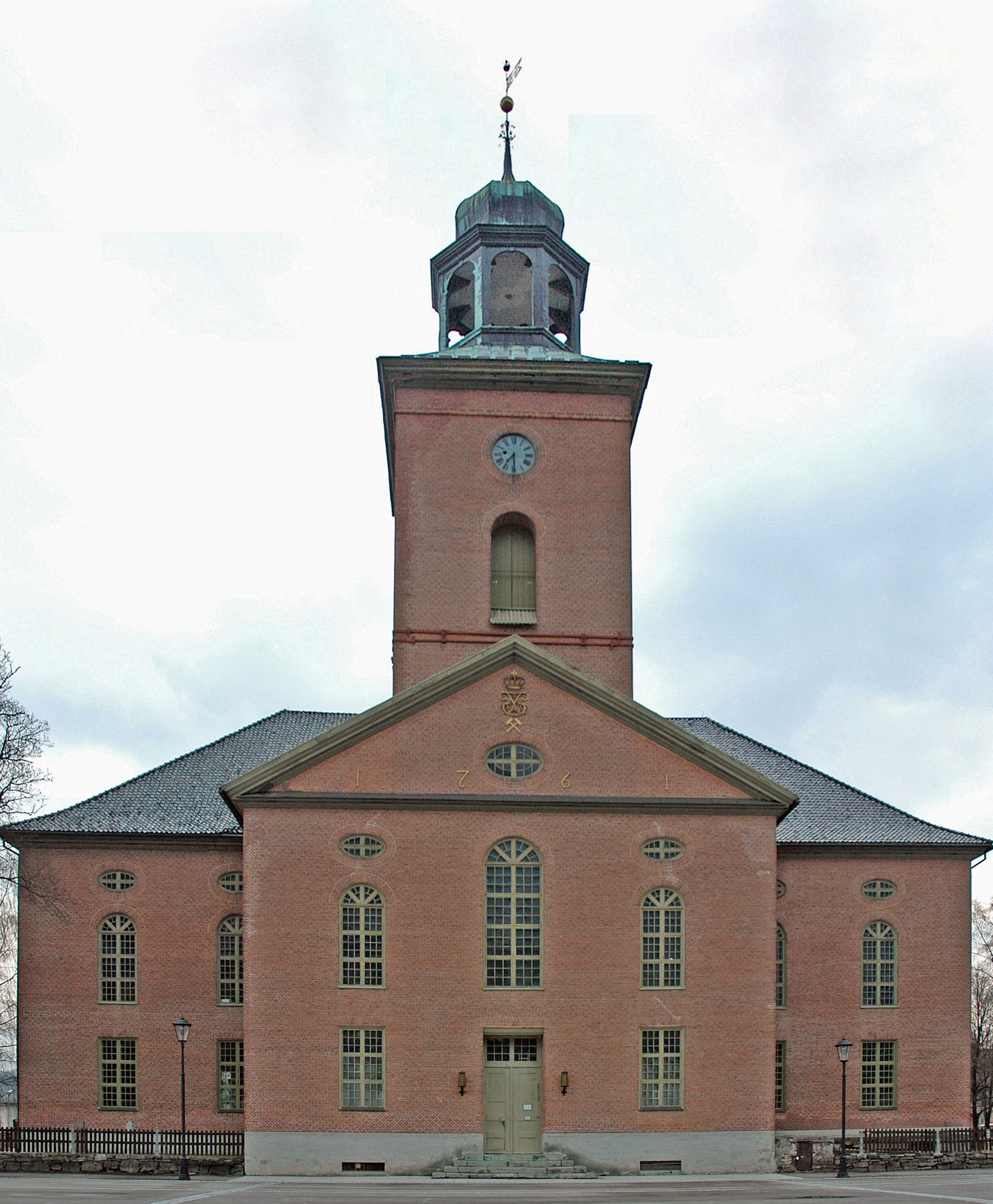
Kongsberg Church

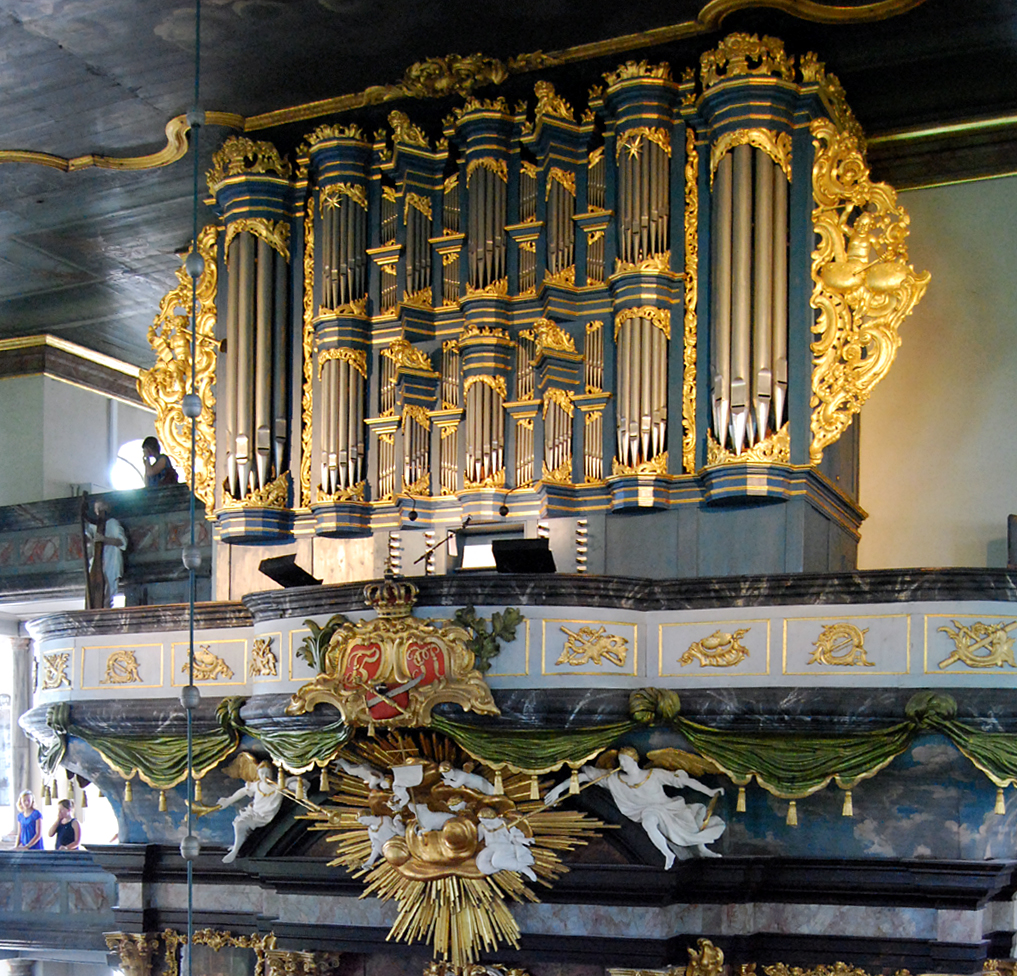
Kongsberg Church baroque organ

With the population increase during the town's silver mining heyday of the mid-eighteenth century came the need for a new church, which was built over a 21-year period and inaugurated in 1761. It has an austere red brick exterior, but a richly decorated baroque interior including unique chandeliers made at Nøstetangen Glass Works in neighbouring Hokksund. Kongsberg Church remains one of the largest in Norway with a seating capacity of 2,400.

The church's original baroque-era pipe organ, made by renowned German organ builder Gottfried Heinrich Gloger in 1760–65, was fully restored by Jürgen Ahrend in 1999–2000 and reopened to great fanfare in January 2001. With its 42 voices, it is the largest baroque organ in Scandinavia. At the end of January each year, the Gloger Music Festival now draws a select crowd of artists and music lovers from all over the world.

Since 1964, Kongsberg has hosted Kongsberg Jazzfestival, an annual international jazz festival. Heavily sponsored by the local industry, prominent world acts such as B. B. King, Diana Krall, Ornette Coleman, Joshua Redman and John Scofield have played at the festival in recent years.

== Sport ==
The town is known for many great ski jumpers. Birger Ruud and his two brothers, as well as many other townsmen, such as Petter Hugsted, won numerous medals in Winter Olympics and other international championships in the 1930s and 1940s. The first ski jumping technique, the Konsberger was developed by Jacob Tullin Thams and Sigmund Ruud in Kongsberg, and was the most popular ski jumping technique from the late 1920s to the late 1950s. Their medals and equipment can be seen at the Kongsberg Skiing Museum (Kongsberg Skimuseum) which is co-located with the Norwegian Mining Museum (Norsk Bergverksmuseum) in central Kongsberg. Inventor of the modern ski binding, Norwegian-American skier and Olympic skiing coach Hjalmar Hvam, was born in Kongsberg in 1902. Recent winter sports athletes of the Kongsberg region include Olympic snowboarders Stine Brun Kjeldaas, Silje Norendal and Halvor Lunn; cross-country ski sprinter Børre Næss of the village Efteløt; and ski jumper Sigurd Pettersen of nearby municipality Rollag (60 km/37 mi north of Kongsberg). A large ski centre for alpine skiing and snowboarding, with several lifts and ca 320 m of height difference has been in operation and gradually expanding since 1965. Kongsberg hosted the cross-country skiing parts of the 2006 Nordic skiing National Championships. The arranging sports club was IL Skrim, the ski tracks being located at Heistadmoen, a former military camp.

The local basketball team Kongsberg Miners is regarded one of the best teams in the country.

The 1978 World Orienteering Championships were held in Kongsberg.

Motorcycle speedway has been prominent in Kongsberg. The first track existed at the Kongsberg Idrettsparken and it held the final of the Norwegian Individual Speedway Championship in 1969. More recently speedway practices have sporadically been run on an oval track (known as Basserudåsen Speedway) constructed by the NMK Kongsberg, adjacent to the Kongsberg Motorsenter Gokart. This site also held the final of the Norwegian Championships in 1997, 1998 and 2003.

== The crowns in Håvet ==
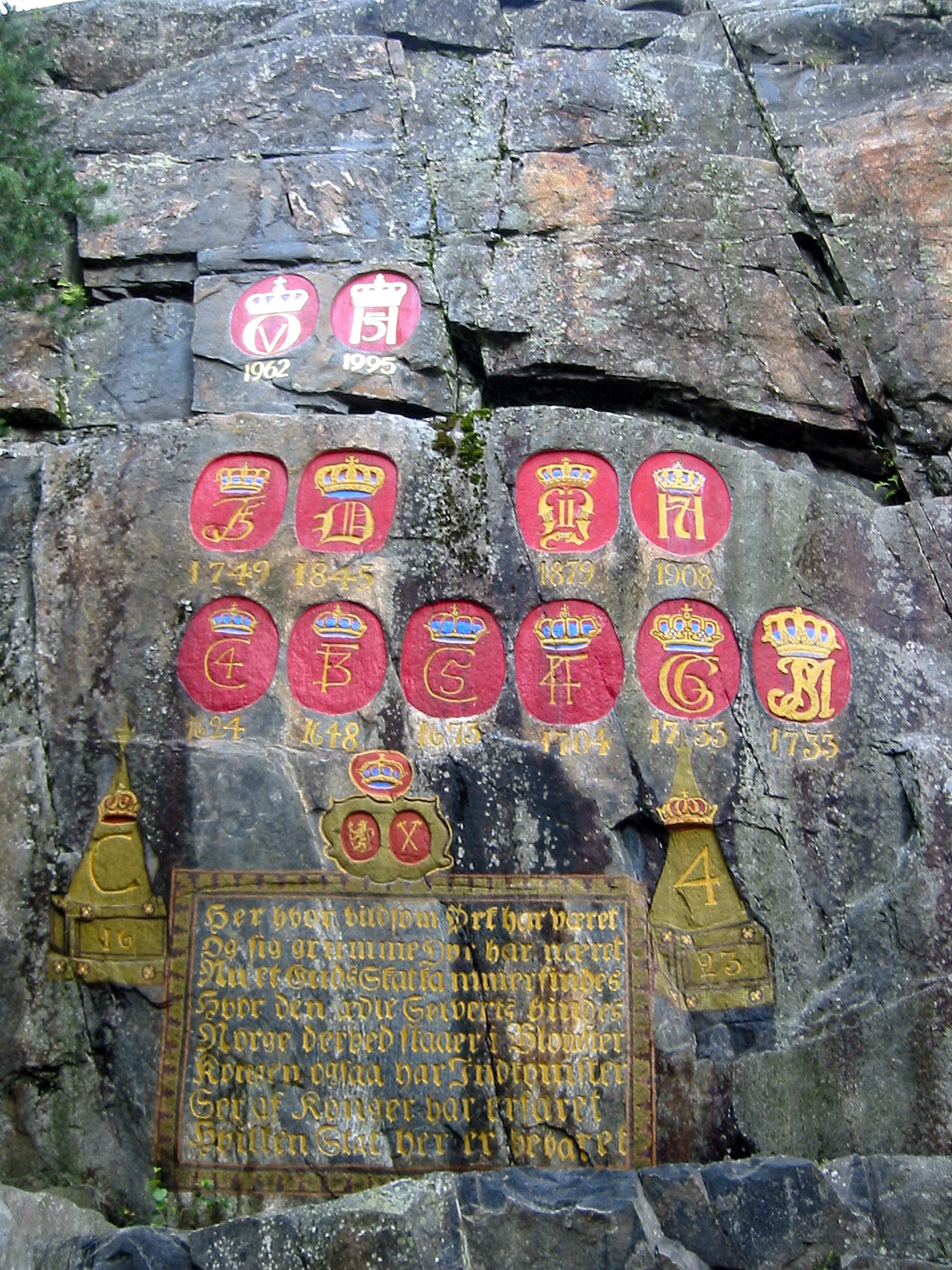
Kronene i Håvet

This attraction (Kronene i Håvet) is a site where Norwegian royal monograms have been carved into the mountainside overlooking Kongsberg to mark royal visits to the city. In June 1704 King Frederik IV visited Kongsberg and started a tradition that is still celebrated. King Frederik also arranged for the monograms of visits from earlier monarchs to be recorded as well.

The first monogram on the hillside property belonged to Christian IV who in 1624 founded Kongsberg at the site of the newly discovered silver deposits. His visit was followed by that of Frederik III (1648) and Christian V (1685). Christian VI and his Queen Sofie Magdalene (1733), Frederik V (1749), Oscar I (1845), Oscar II (1890), Haakon VII (1908), Olav V (1962) and most recently Harald V (1995).

== Kongsberg Technology Park ==
Kongsberg Technology Park is a part of Kongsberg that is located in Kirkegårdsveien 45 and the Arsenal on Kongsgårdsmoen. It has over 5.200 employees, spread across 60 nationalities and 48 countries and can trace its roots back to 1814. Among the tenants in Kongsberg Technology Park are Kongsberg Gruppen, Kongsberg Defence & Aerospace, GKN Aerospace, Siemens Energy, Kongsberg Terotech, TechnipFMC, Data Respons, and Kongsberg Precision Cutting Systems.

The park also manages properties in Stjørdal, Horten, Sandefjord, Skedsmo, Asker, Bærum, Oslo, Rygge, Kristiansand, Stavanger, Ulsteinvik and Brattvåg.

== Notable residents ==
=== Public service & public thinking ===
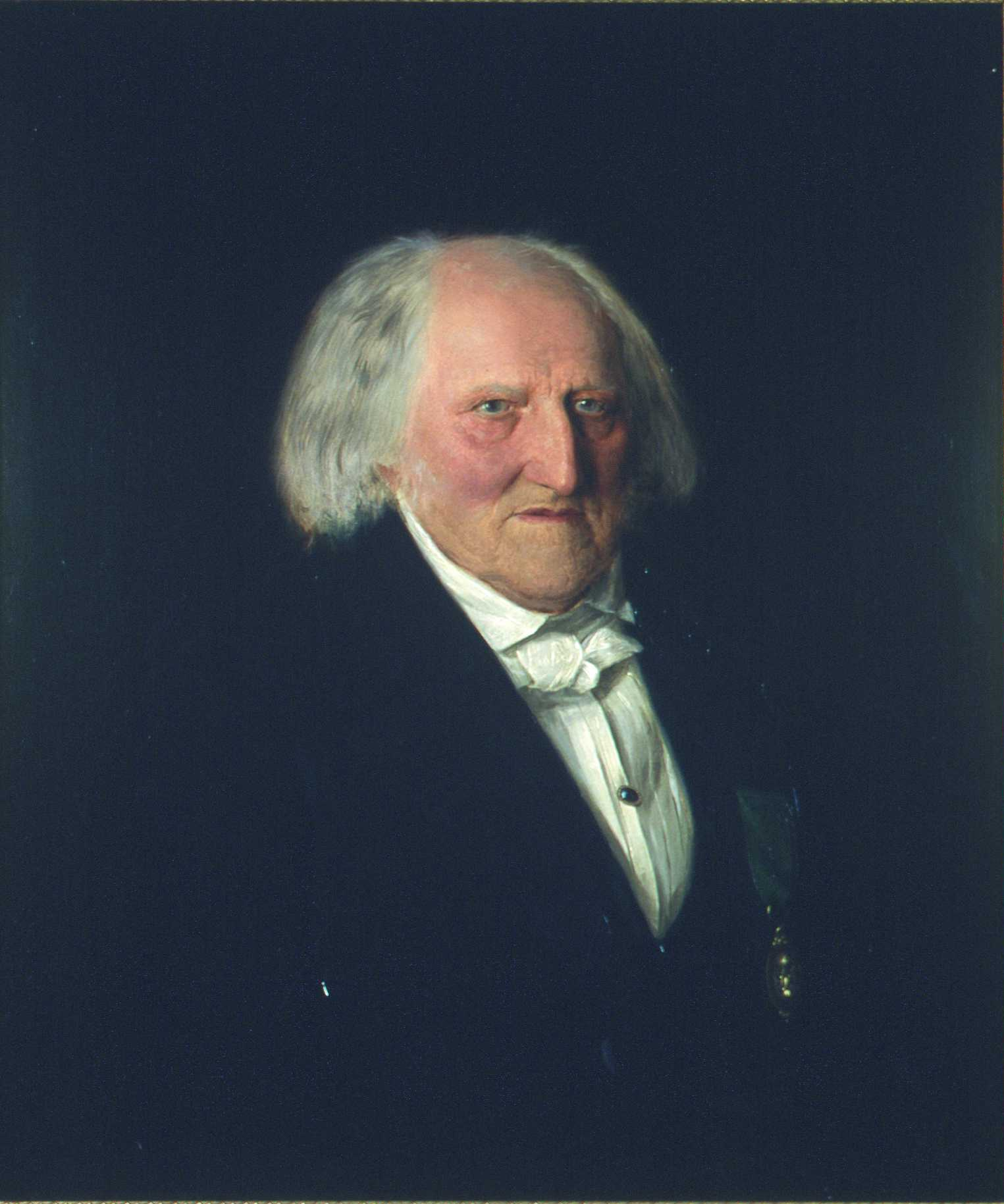
Poul Steenstrup, 1814

- Johan Gerhard de Besche (1821–1875) – a physician, owned the Morgenbladet newspaper
- Christian Peder Bianco Boeck (1798–1877) – a doctor, zoologist, botanist and mountaineer
- Carl Wilhelm Boeck (1808–1875) – a Norwegian dermatologist
- Erik Brofoss (1908–1979) – Economist and jurist, politician for the Labour Party and central bank governor
- Thomas Bryn (1782–1827) – a jurist, magistrate and rep. at the Constitutional Assembly
- Anders Bugge (1889–1955) – Norwegian theologist and art historian
- Morten Thrane Esmark (1801–1882) – a Norwegian priest and mineralogist, Discoverer of Thorium
- Sverre Fehn (1924–2009) – Architect and professor at Oslo's School of Architecture from 1971 to 1995
- Roar Flåthen (born 1950) – Union leader and LO leader from 2007 to 2013.
- Bernt Hagtvet (born 1946) – Professor of political science at the University of Oslo

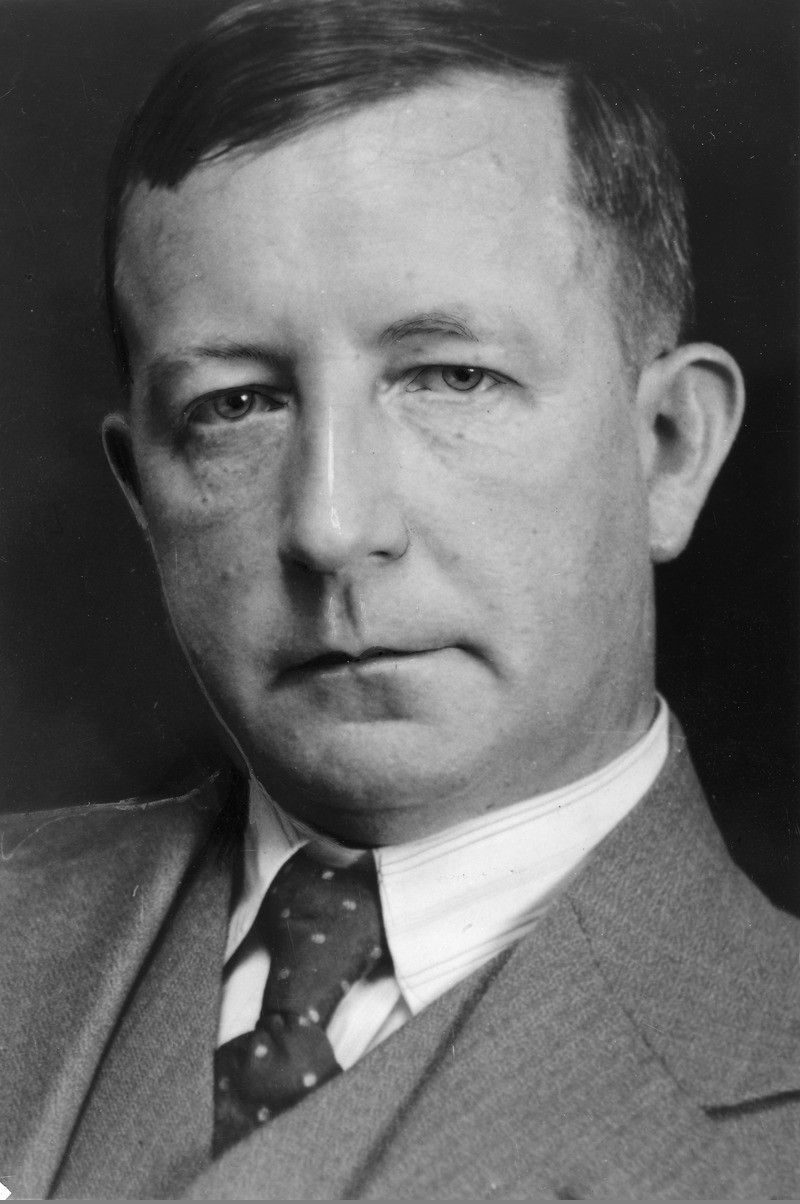
Thoralf Skolem made revolutionary contributions to mathematical logic

- Paul Ernst Wilhelm Hartmann (1878–1974) – Finance minister who served in the exile government of Johan Nygaardsvold during World War II
- Iver Heltzen (1785–1842) – Norwegian priest, naturalist, and author
- Gustava Kielland (1800–1889) – Writer and missionary
- Jens Landmark (1811–1880) – a Norwegian military officer and Mayor of Kongsberg
- Tinius Olsen (1845–1932) – Norwegian-American engineer and inventor
- Ole Petter Ottersen (born 1955) – Professor of medicine and rector at the University of Oslo from 2009 to 2017
- Thoralf Skolem (1887–1963) – Professor of mathematics at the University of Oslo
- Poul Steenstrup (1772–1864) – industrial entrepreneur and rep. the Constitutional Assembly
- Gunhild Stordalen (born 1979) – Physician and environmentalist, was married to the billionaire Petter Stordalen
- Jørgen Herman Vogt (1784–1862) – First Minister of Norway, 1855 to 1858

=== The Arts ===
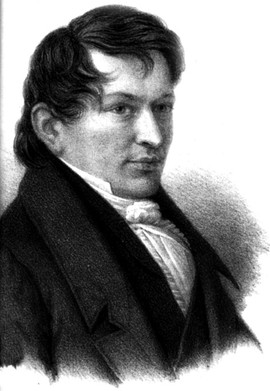
Maurits Hansen

- Tine Asmundsen (born 1963) – a Norwegian jazz bassist
- Ingri d'Aulaire (1904–1980) – American writer of children's books
- Håkon Austbø (born 1948) – a classical pianist and academic in the Netherlands
- Halfdan Cleve (1879–1951) – classical composer and music teacher
- Ivar Grydeland (born 1976) – jazz guitarist, raised in Kongsberg
- Maurits Hansen (1794–1842) – journalist and novelist, teacher in Kongsberg from 1826
- Morten Harket (born 1959) – lead singer of the synth-pop band a-ha
- Per Theodor Haugen (1932–2018) – actor and theater manager
- Morten Qvenild (born 1978) – jazz pianist, band leader and producer
- Otto Sinding (1842–1909) – painter, illustrator, poet and dramatist
- Christian Sinding (1856–1941) – composer and pianist

=== Sport ===
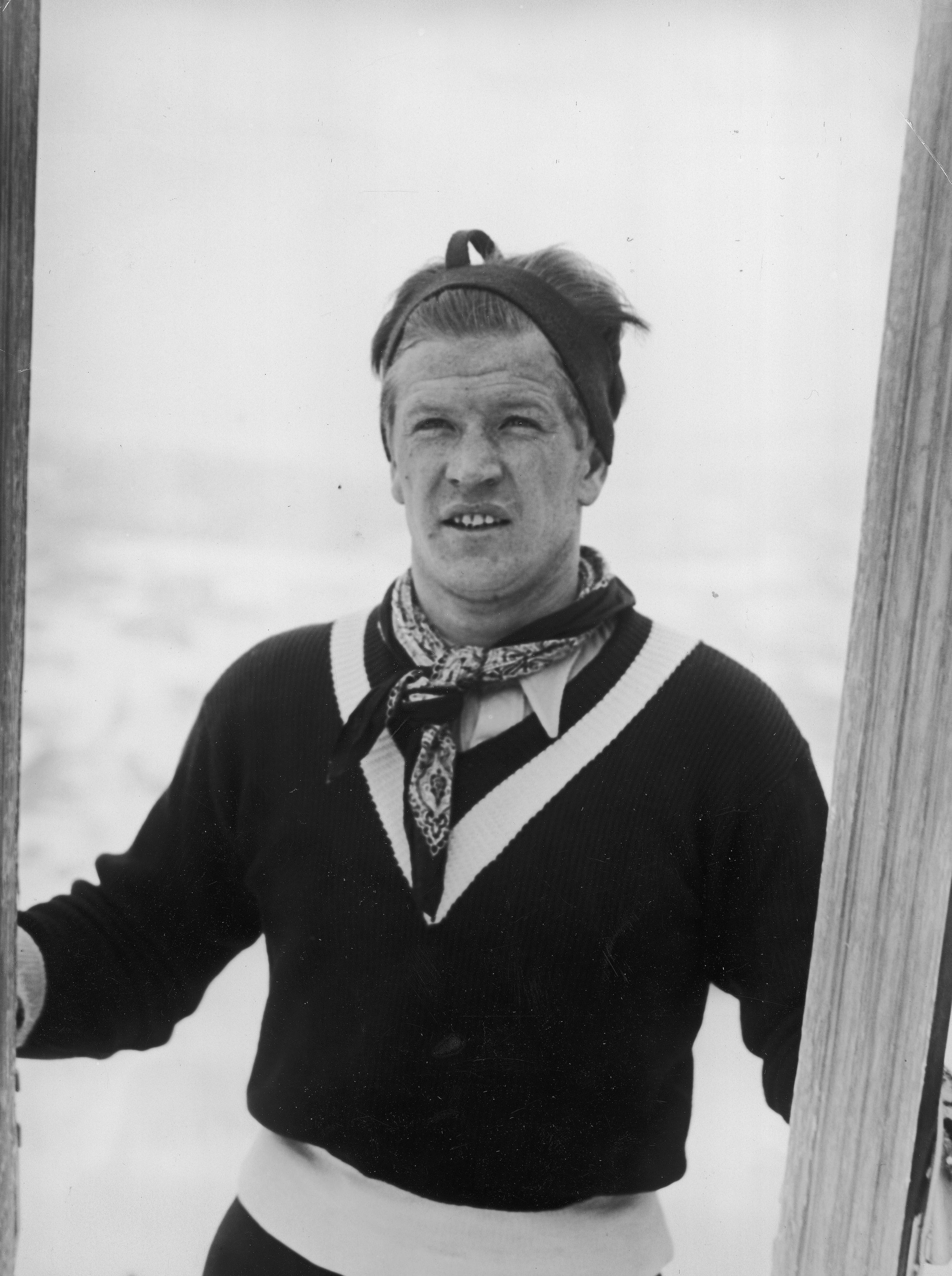
Birger Ruud, 1936

- Hans Beck (1911–1996) – ski jumper, silver medalist at the 1932 Winter Olympics
- Ailo Gaup (born 1979) – former freestyle motocross rider who invented the Underflip and won world title in FMX
- Petter Hugsted (1921–2000) – ski jumper, gold medalist in the 1948 Winter Olympics
- Hjalmar Hvam (1902–1996) – Nordic skier and invented the first safety ski binding
- Bryan King (born 1947) – British footballer with over 540 club caps and scout, lives in Kongsberg
- Roy Mikkelsen (1907–1967) – an American Olympic ski jumper and US Champion
- Silje Norendal (born 1993) – Snowboarder and gold medalist in Winter X Games
- Birger Ruud (1911–1998) – ski jumper, gold medalist at the 1932 & 1936 Winter Olympics
- Sigmund Ruud (1907–1994) – ski jumper, silver medalist at the 1928 Winter Olympics
- Magnus Sylling Olsen (born 1983) – a retired Norwegian footballer with over 250 club caps
- Daniel-André Tande (born 1994) – ski jumper and team gold medalist at the 2018 Winter Olympics

== Twin towns – sister cities ==
Kongsberg is twinned with:

- Chitose, Japan
- Espoo, Finland
- Gouda, Netherlands
- Køge, Denmark
- Kristianstad, Sweden
- Skagafjörður, Iceland

== Gallery ==
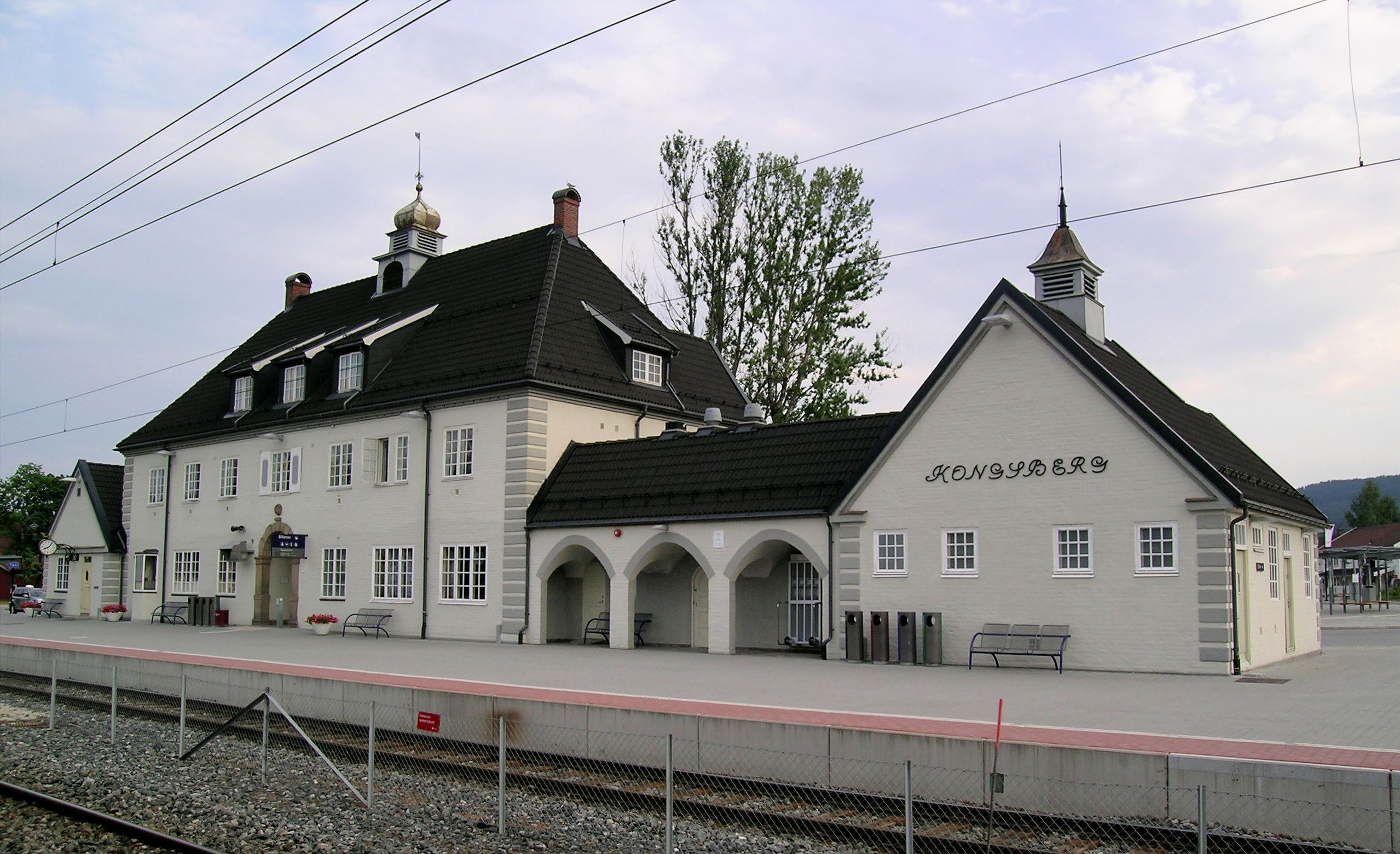
Kongsberg Rail Station

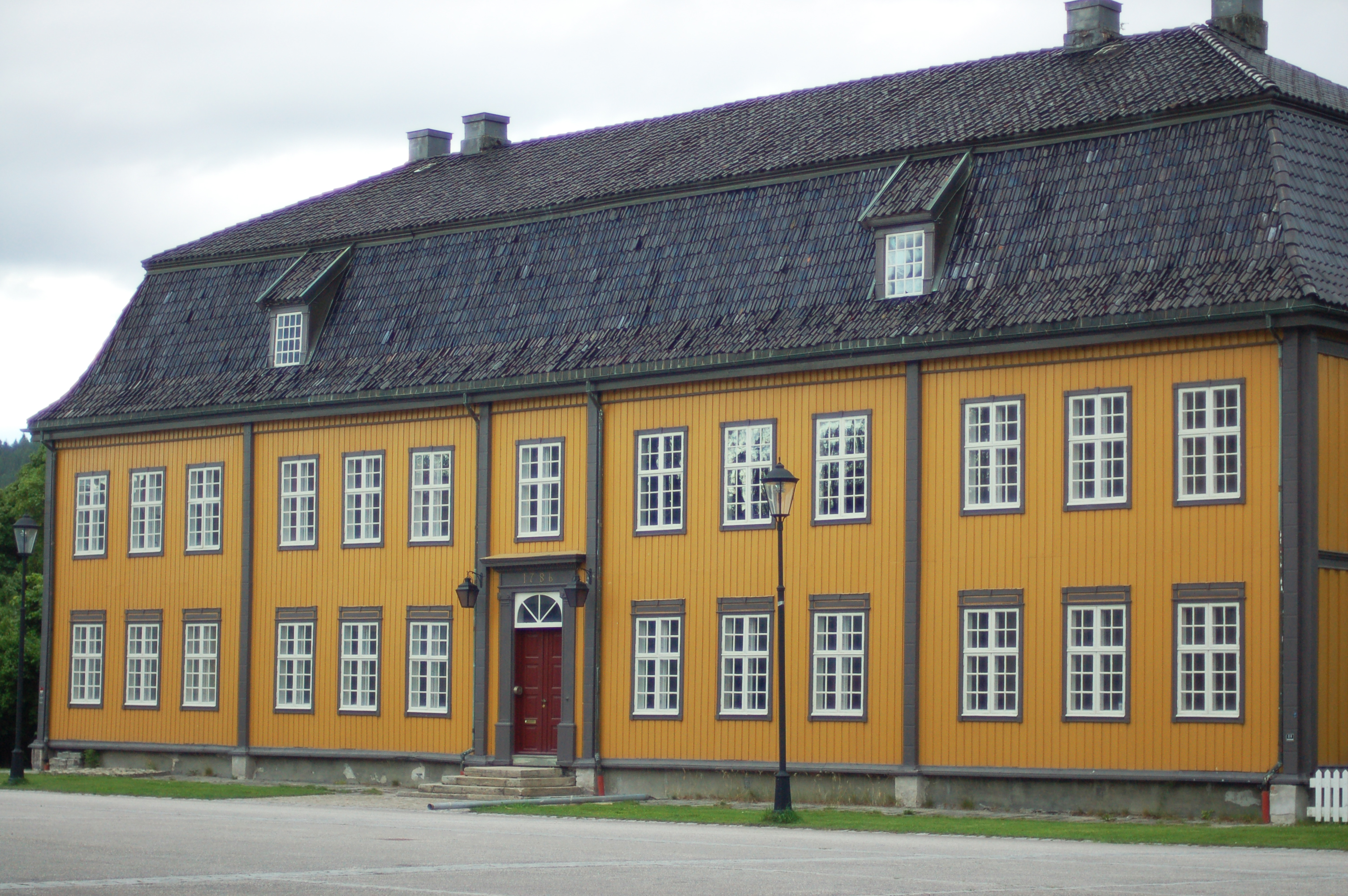
Kongsberg School of Mines

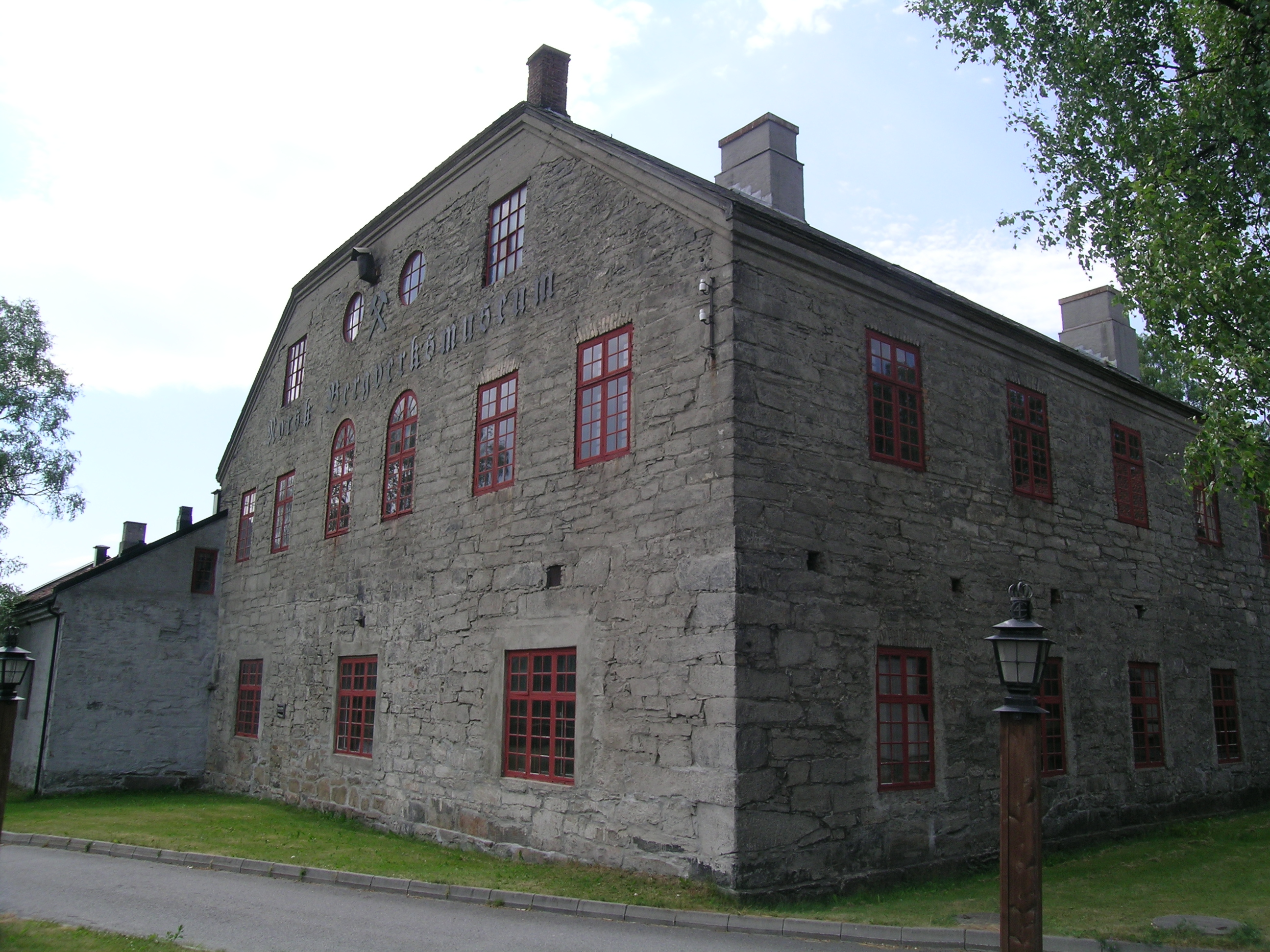
Norwegian Mining Museum

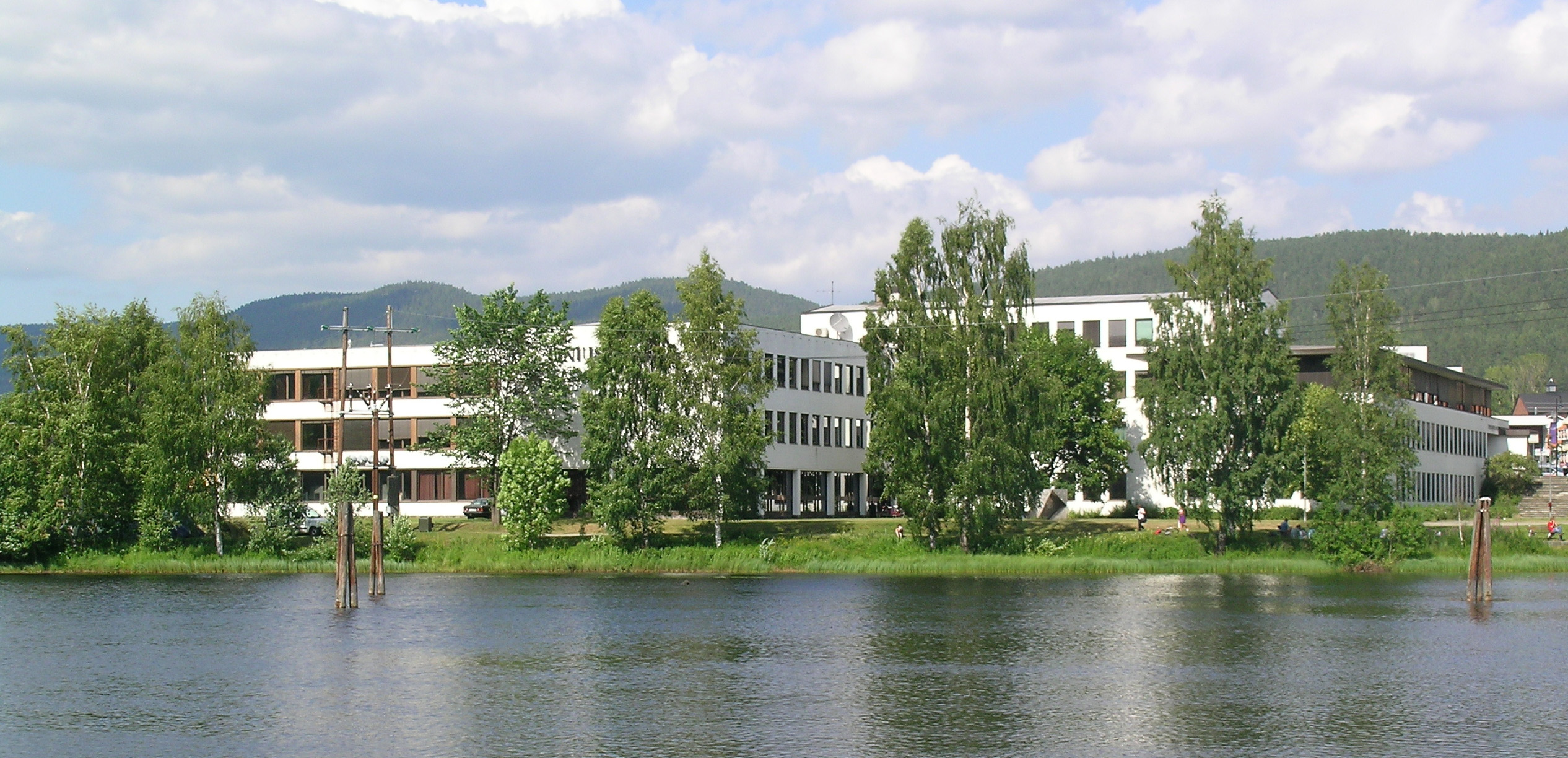
Tinius Olsens School

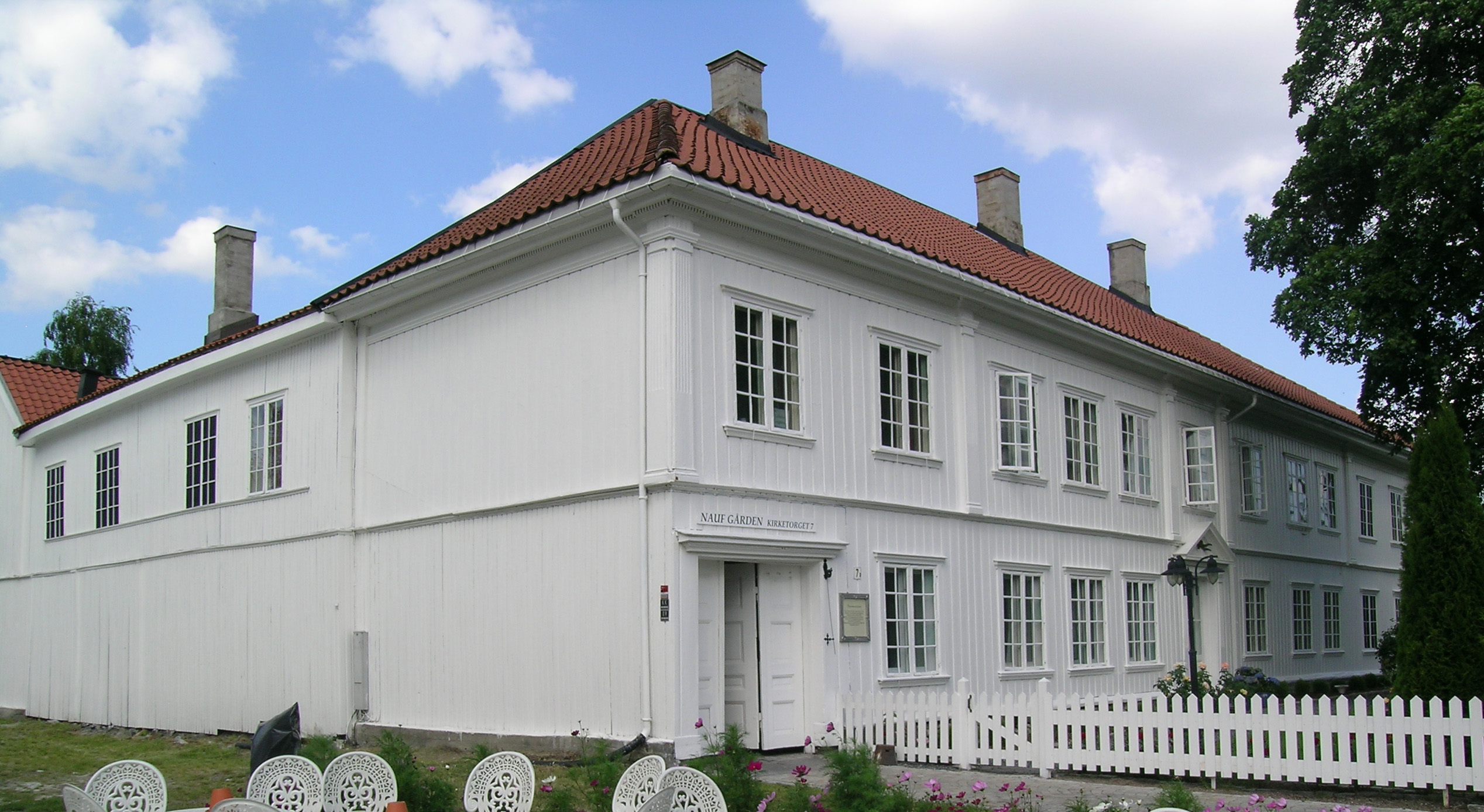
Kongsberg Bergskrivergaarden

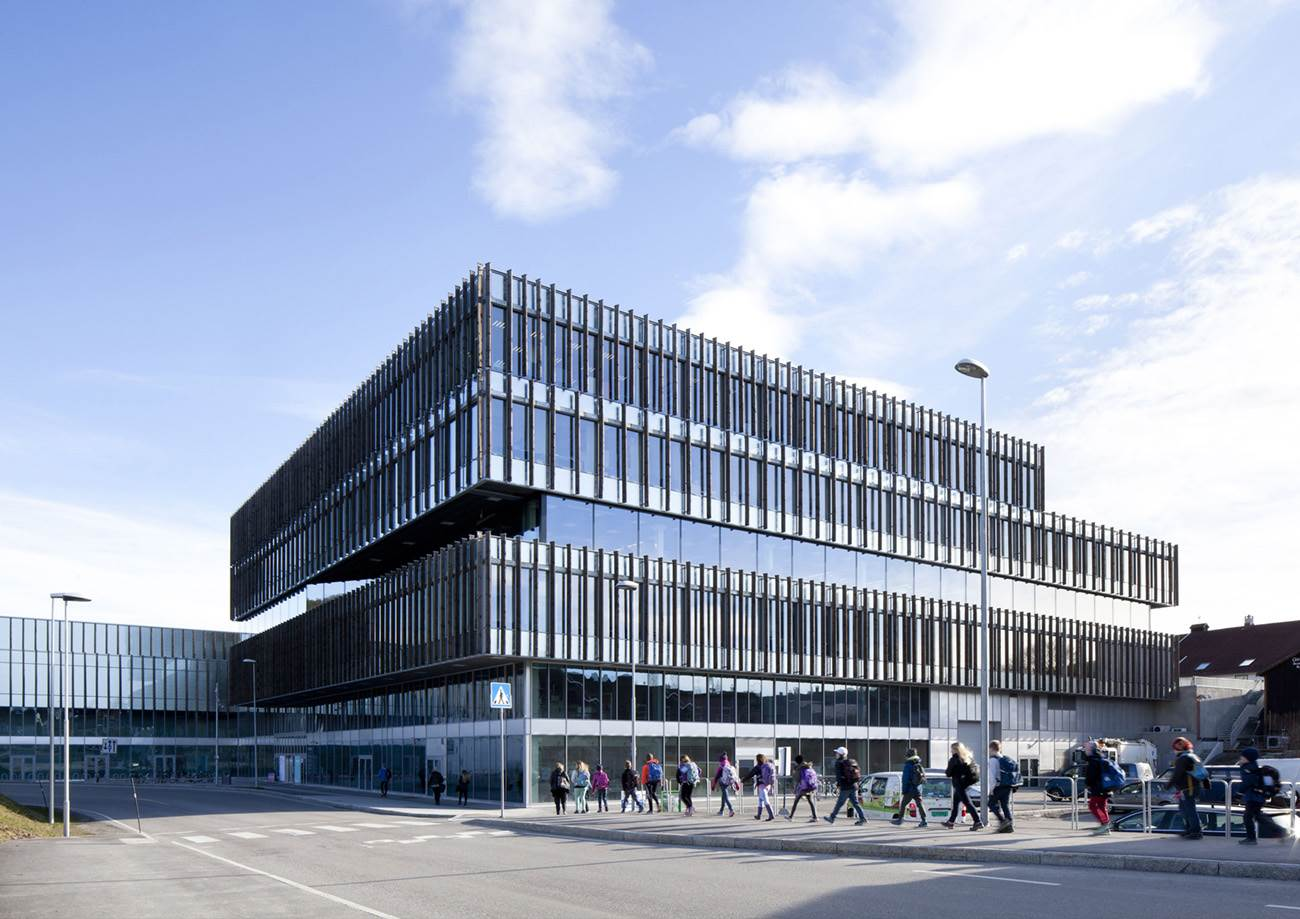
University of South-Eastern Norway, campus Kongsberg

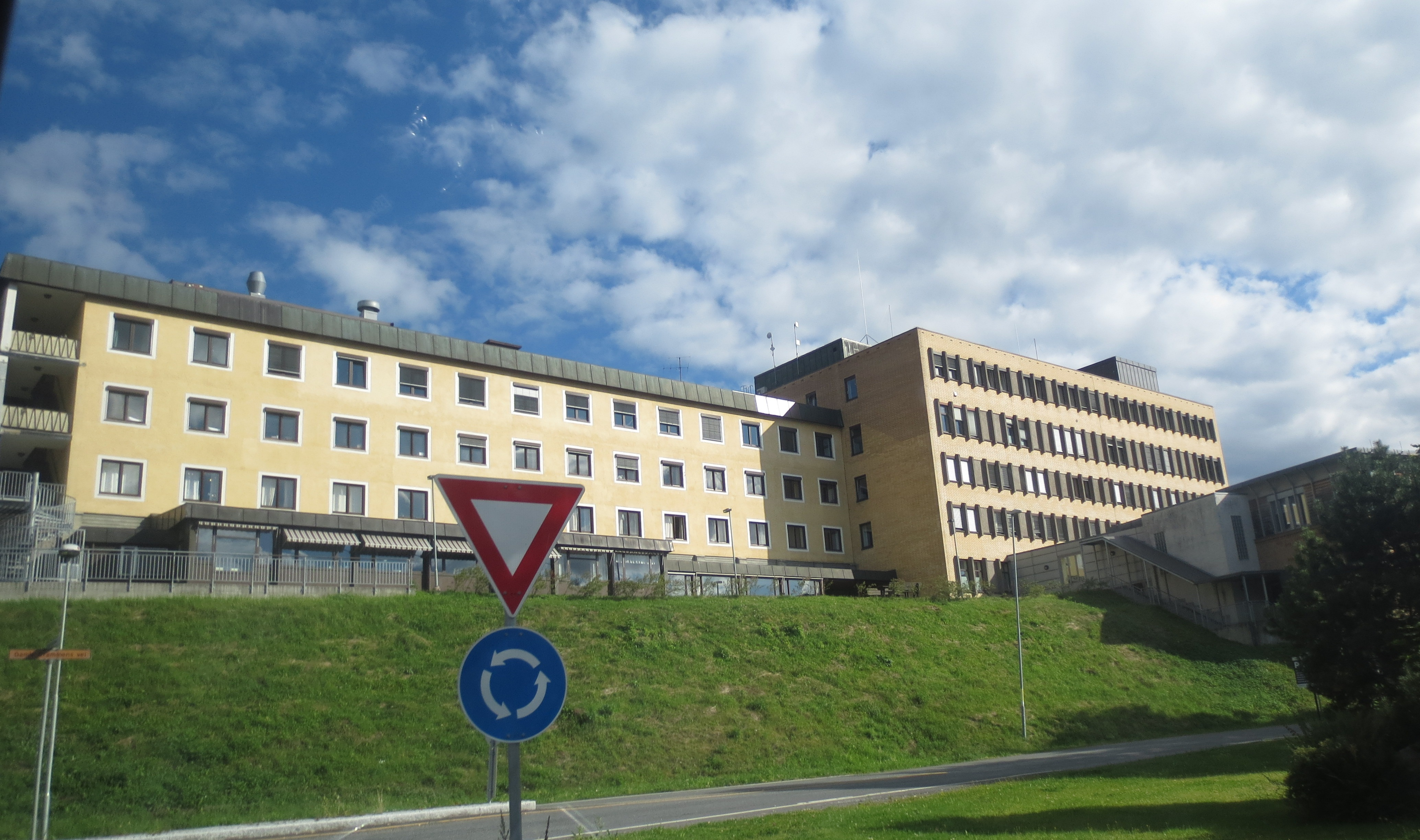
Kongsberg hospital

== See also ==
- Kongsberg Skiing Museum
- Mykle, lake
- Norwegian Mining Museum
