= Øvre Sandsvær Municipality =

Øvre Sandsvær Municipality Øvre Sandsvær kommune
- Municipality
- Location within Buskerud Location within Norway
- Coordinates: 59°37′19″N 9°39′33″E
- Country: Norway
- County: Buskerud

Population (1964)
  - Total: 2,854
- Time zone: UTC+01:00 (CET)
  - Summer (DST): UTC+02:00 (CEST)

Øvre Sandsvær is a former municipality in Buskerud county, Norway. Its name translates to Upper Sandsvær.

== History ==
From 1837, Øvre Sandsvær was a part of the Sandsvær presidency. The kommune was created on January 1, 1908, when Sandsvær was split into Øvre Sandsvær and Ytre Sandsvær. In 1939, one of the municipalities' districts was moved into the Flesberg municipality. On January 1, 1964, Øvre and Ytre Sandsvær were incorporated into the Kongsberg municipality.

== Population ==
At the time of its creation in 1908, Øvre Sandsvær had a population of 2,464. In 1939, its population was 2,431. In 1964, just before it ceased to be recognized as a municipality, it had a population of 2,854.

Historical population
Year	Pop.	±%
1908	2,464	—
1939	2,431	−1.3%
1964	2,854	+17.4%
