= Norwegian Mining Museum =

Mining museum in Kongsberg, Norway

Coordinates: 59.6660°N 9.6508°E

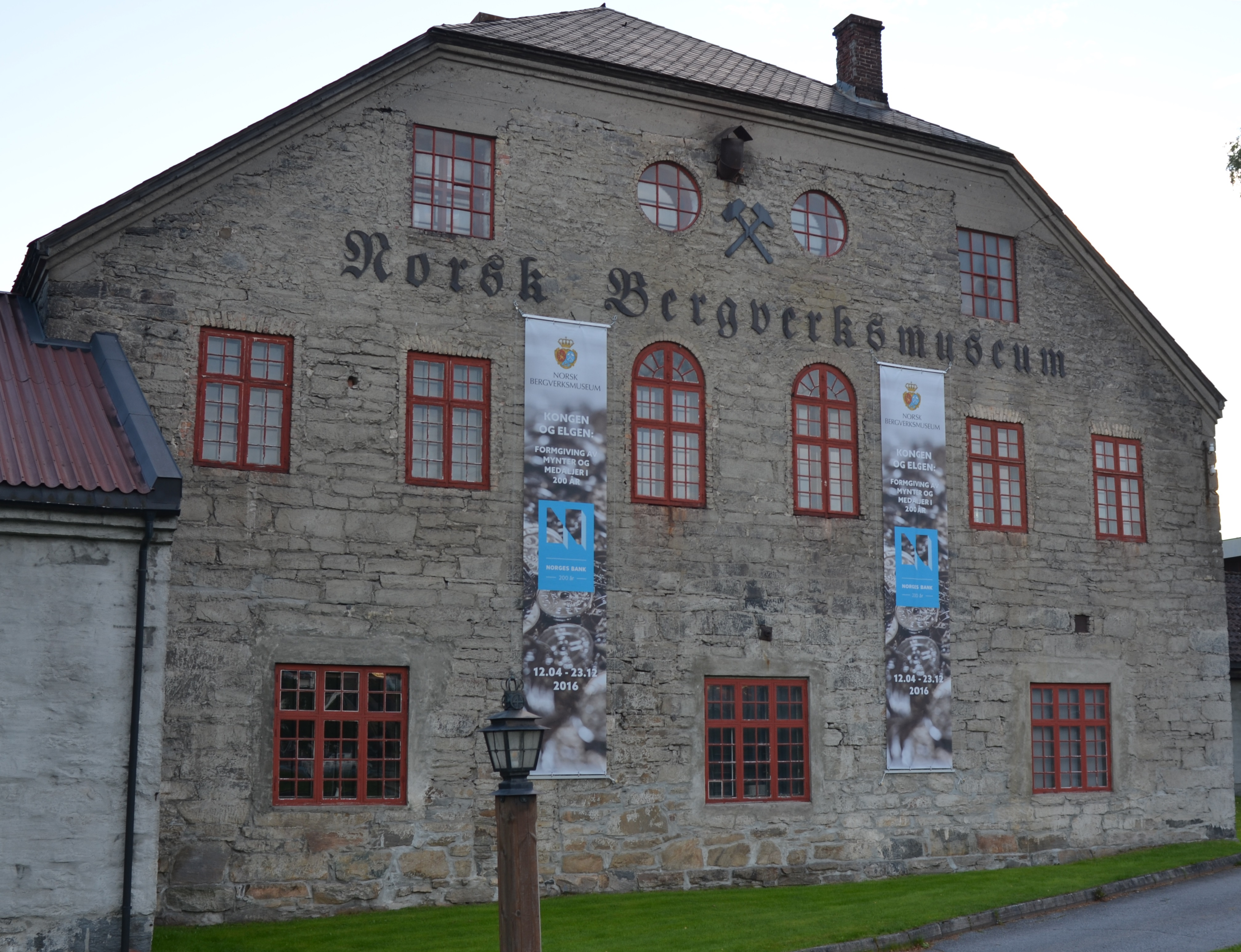
Norwegian Mining Museum in Kongsberg.

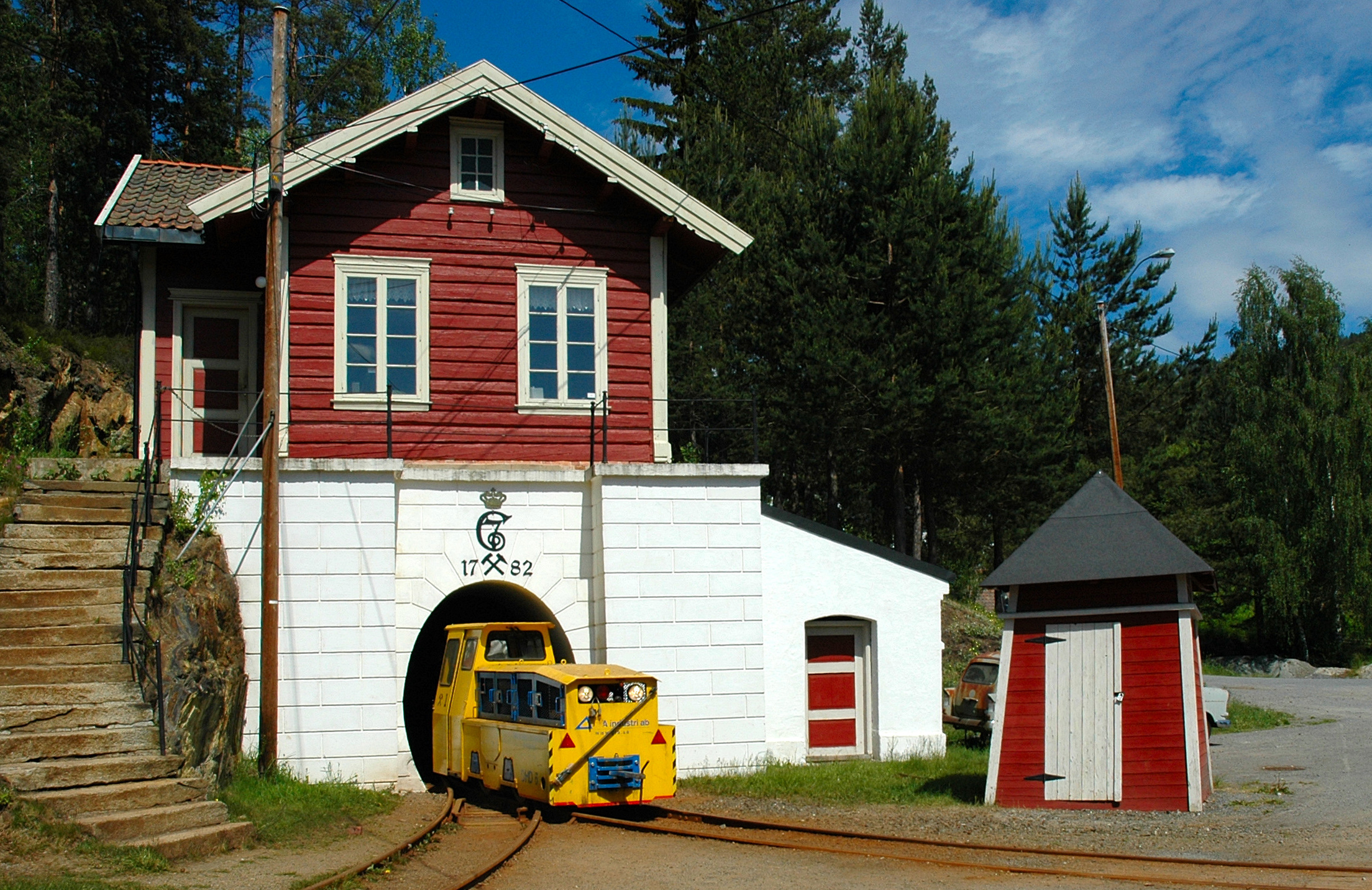
Entrance of King's Mine, Kongsberg

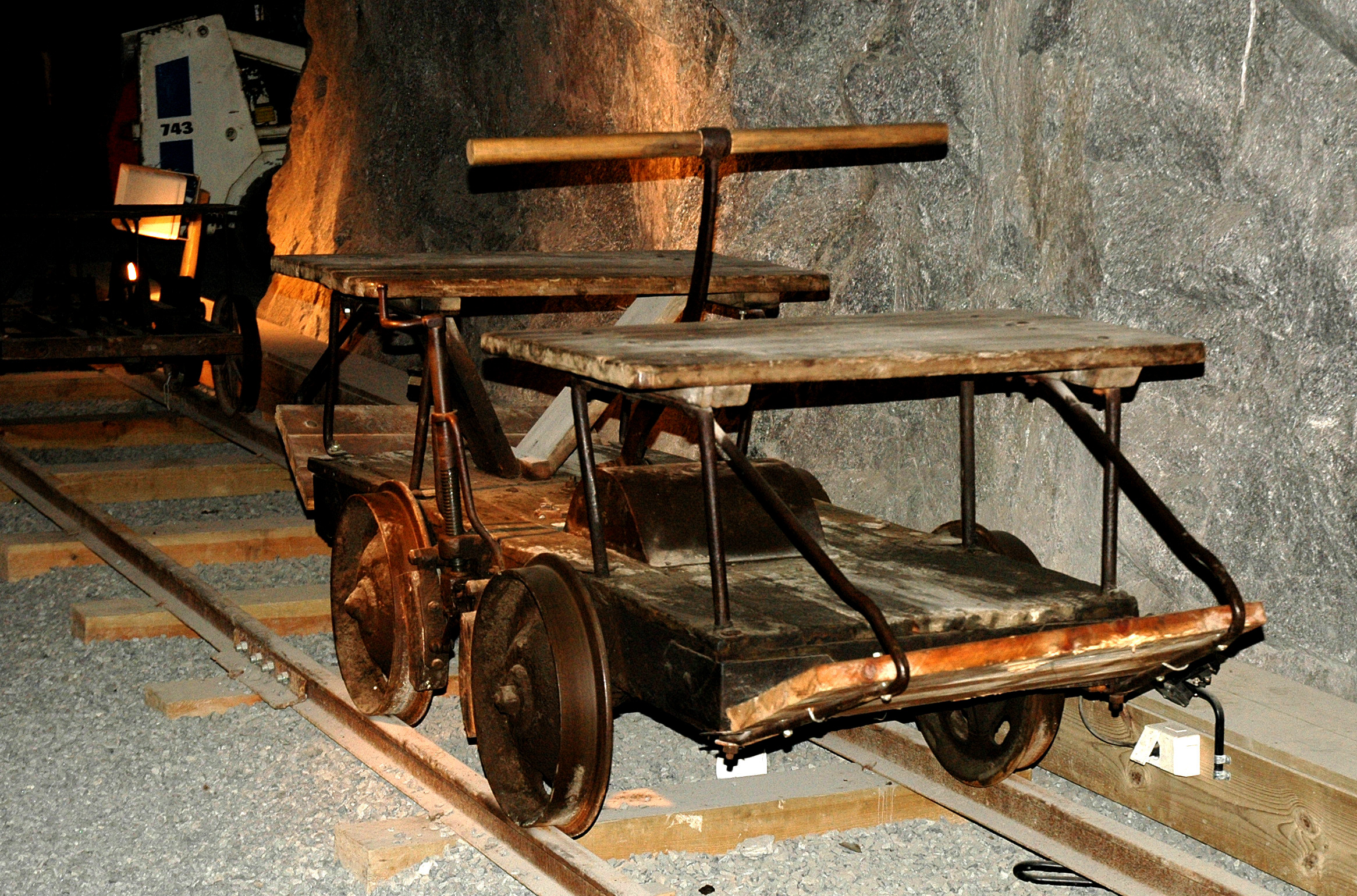
Velocipede trolley exhibited at the mining museum.

The Norwegian Mining Museum (Norwegian: Norsk Bergverksmuseum) is located at Kongsberg in Buskerud county, Norway.

Norwegian Mining Museum documents the history of the former Kongsberg Silver Mines (Kongsberg Sølvverk). The museum was established in 1938, and opened to the public in 1945. The museum documents the development of mining throughout the period the silver mines in Kongsberg were in operation.

As early as the 15th century, there was mining in the area. Copper ore was then taken out. Around 1540, silver-containing lead ore was also found. Silver deposits at Kongsberg were first discovered in 1629 with mines were in operation until 1958.

The cultural heritage dates from the 18th century, but there are traces of mining through the entire period of operation. The mining captain's house, cottages, stables, foundation for a water wheel as well as the system of aqueducts and dams are preserved. Situated close to the entrance of the silver mines are shelters once used by the miners. These buildings were built between the period 1867 and 1874. A mine train pulled by diesel locomotives takes visitors 342 meters below the surface and 2.3 km into the mountain. Inside the former mine there is a guided tour. An interesting device is the mine elevator which was built in 1881.

== Other Sources ==
- Helleberg, Odd Arne (2000) Kongsberg sølvverk 1623–1958: kongenes øyensten – rikenes pryd (Kongsberg : Sølvverkets venner) ISBN 82-7494-033-4
