= Sandsvær Municipality =

Former municipality in Norway

Coordinates: 59°32′53″N 9°48′33″E

Sandsvær is an area in Kongsberg, Buskerud county, Norway. The area is identical to the former municipality named Sandsvær. Sandsvær is situated in the valley of Lågendalen on the Numedalslågen river, and is bordered by Kongsberg town in the north, and the county border to Vestfold and Telemark counties in the south.

Historically, Sandsvær as a part of Sandsvær og Numedal fogderi had belonged to Akershus amt from 7 February 1685. In 1760 Sandsvær fogderi was moved administratively to Buskerud.

The municipality was created as Kongsberg landdistrikt in 1837. The municipality existed until 1 January 1908, when it was split to form the new municipalities Ytre Sandsvær and Øvre Sandsvær. Prior to the split Sandsvær had a population of 5,709. Both municipalities were later incorporated into Kongsberg.

== The name ==
The Old Norse form of the name was Sandshverfi. The first element is the genitive case of sandr m 'sand', the last element is hverfi n 'district'.
