= 1858 Christiania fire =

1858 fire in Norway

Coordinates: 59°54′44″N 10°44′46″E

The 1858 Christiania fire, starting on 14 April 1858, severely destroyed several city blocks near Stortorvet in Christiania, Norway. 41 buildings were destroyed, and about 1,000 people lost their homes.

== Course of events ==
The fire started around at one o'clock in the night, in the home of a carpenter in a wooden building within the city block west of the street Dronningens gate. The wind was blowing from the north, and within one hour five houses were set on fire. Within three hours buildings east of Dronningens gate started burning. This block had many old wooden houses, and the whole block was soon on fire and burned down completely except for one building. An important task for the firefighters was to prevent the fire from spreading southwards across the street Prinsens gate. A fire engine pump from the fortress was placed here, and the crew managed to stop it spreading further southwards. Somewhat unexpectedly the fire jumped across the wide street of Kirkegaten. Some of the buildings collapsed rather quickly, and two of the firefighters perished during those events. To the east, crew from the ship Lindesnes managed to prevent the fire from crossing the street Skippergaten. After great efforts the firefighters succeeded in stopping the fire from spreading north and westwards across the streets Kongens gate and Østre gate.

== Outcome ==
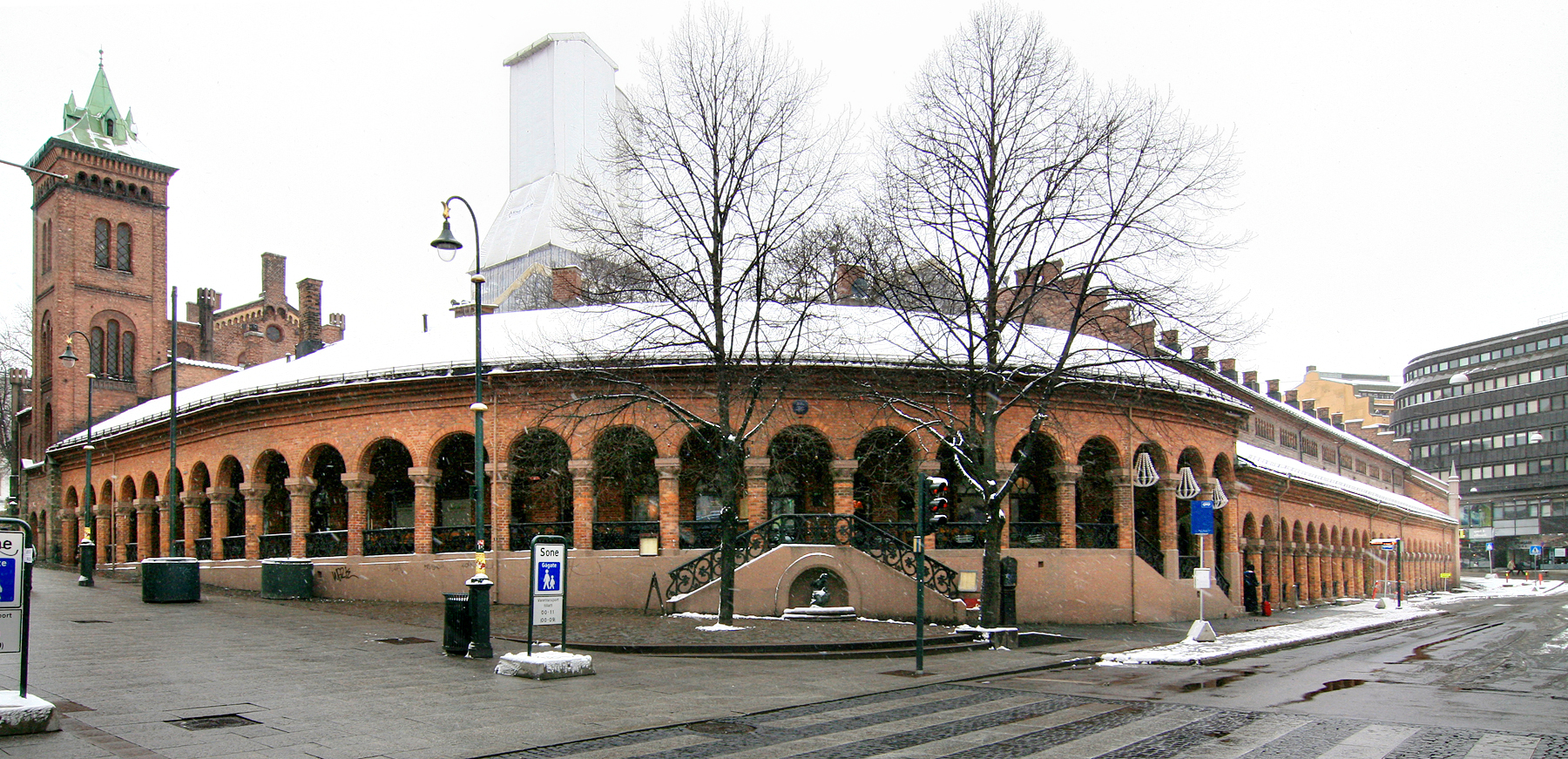
The city block across the street south of the bazaar halls burned down in 1858. The old firewatch building is seen behind to the left.

Eventually the whole block between the streets Prinsens gate, Kirkegaten, Østre gate and Dronningens gate was destroyed. Also nearly all buildings of the block east of Dronningens gate burned down, as well as large parts of the block west of Kirkegaten. A total of 41 buildings burned down. Based on the census from 1855, the number of persons living within the destroyed area was 808. Adding an assumed extra number due to later development, it was estimated in contemporary newspaper reports that about 1,000 persons lost their homes due to the fire. The number of livestock numbered to 38 horses and eight cows in 1855, and was presumed to be of the same order in 1858, although no specific report is available. Large quantities of household contents and goods had been saved from the burning houses, much of it assembled at the market place.

== Aftermath ==
The fire had a definite impact on decisions regarding the future of the city. Funding for a new water supply was decided four weeks after the fire. This included a new dam at Maridalsoset, the outlet of Maridalsvannet. The old piping system of the city was made of linked pine logs with drilled holes. The new water pipelines were based on cast iron. The old water pumps at the crossroads disappeared, and households got tap water installed. Also, the fire department of the city was eventually reorganized.
