= Battle of the Square =

1829 protest in Oslo

Coordinates: 59.9127°N 10.7452°E

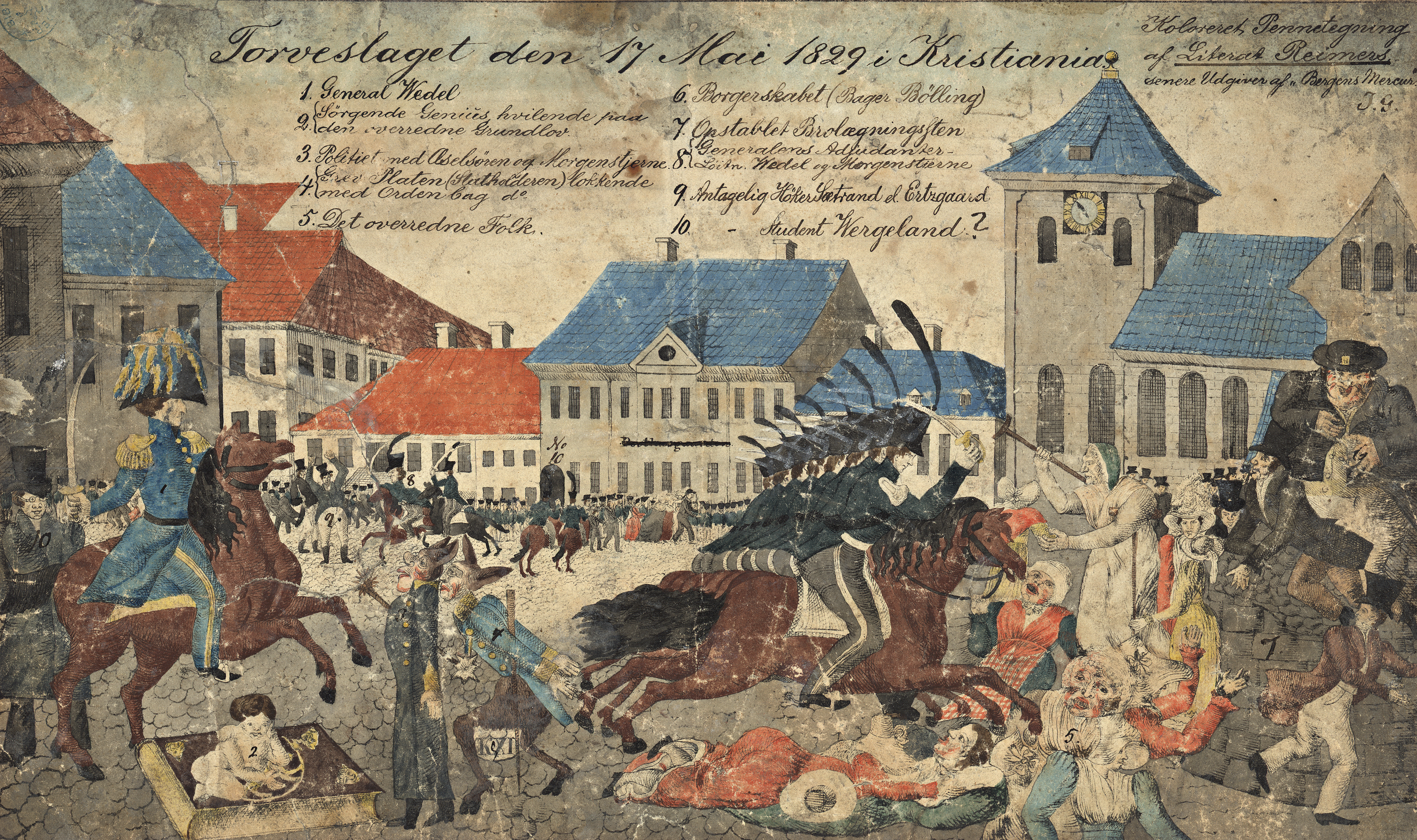
- Contemporary depiction. The officer on horseback on the left of the picture is Major-General Ferdinand Wedel-Jarlsberg (National Library of Norway).
- Location: Stortorvet, Christiania (Oslo), Norway
- Date: 17 May 1829
- Deaths: 0
- Injuries: around 30
- Assailant: Norwegian Army

The Battle of the Square (Norwegian: Torvslaget, Swedish: Torgslaget) was a skirmish between Norwegian demonstrators and military forces of the United Kingdoms of Sweden and Norway that took place in Oslo (then called Christiania), Norway, on the evening of 17 May 1829.

The demonstrators were participating in the annual celebration of the Constitution of Norway, which had been outlawed by Charles XIV John of Sweden, King of Sweden and Norway, the previous year. The intervention by police and troops provoked outrage in Norway, and forced Charles XIV to lift the prohibition.

== Background ==
The Kingdoms of Denmark and Norway came into personal union in 1380, after the death of Haakon VI of Norway, and remained in union for over four centuries, during which time they fought numerous wars against Sweden. In the aftermath of the Napoleonic Wars, the King of Denmark ceded Norway to the King of Sweden (significantly, not the Kingdom of Sweden) under the Treaty of Kiel, signed in January 1814. The idea of union with the old enemy Sweden was very unpopular in Norway, and so when news of the treaty reached the country, it prompted a groundswell of support for independence. Christian Frederick, Prince of Denmark and Viceroy of Norway, was elected on 17 May 1814 as King of Norway by the Norwegian Constituent Assembly under a new constitution.

However, Christian Frederick was unable to secure international support, as the Great Powers, in particular Britain, wished to reward Sweden for its support against Napoleonic France and to compensate it for the loss of Finland to Russia, and therefore desired to see the Treaty of Kiel enforced. In a short war in summer 1814, Swedish troops invaded Norway and expelled Christian Frederick (who later became King Christian VIII of Denmark). The peace terms offered by the Swedes were relatively generous - the Norwegian constitution was retained on condition that the clauses preventing a personal union with Sweden were excised. On 30 August, King Charles XIII of Sweden (known as Charles II in Norway) was proclaimed the ruler of the United Kingdoms of Sweden and Norway.

Charles XIII died on 5 February 1818 and his adopted son Karl Johan (the former Napoleonic marshal Jean-Baptiste Bernadotte) succeeded him as Charles XIV John of Sweden and Charles III John of Norway.

Public celebrations of the anniversary of the constitution's initial promulgation began to be held in Norway from the mid-1820s. Although the celebrations were outwardly loyalist - toasts were usually made to the royal family as well as to the constitution itself - the Swedish authorities were concerned that such events had a separatist subtext and served as a covert outlet for political agitation against the Swedish-Norwegian union; they instead tried to promote 'Union Day' on 4 November as an alternative focus for patriotic feeling. However, celebrations on 17 May continued. In May 1828, King Charles John obliquely criticised such events during a speech before the Storting (Norwegian Parliament), which on 13 May voted not to hold any official celebrations that year. Later this became a full ban on any celebrations whatsoever.

== Events ==
=== Prelude ===
Despite the ban, illegal flyers, national anthems and slogans began circulating weeks before 17 May 1829. The day itself was a bright cloudless Sunday in Christiania. Initially the city was quiet, and for much of the day the police faced no problems other than some minor drunkenness.

The catalyst for the unrest was the arrival at 6 PM of the symbolically-named steamship Constitutionen. The arriving steamer was met by the crowd that customarily gathered to see vessels arrive at the quayside. However, as feared by the authorities, the gathering also served as an outlet for nationalistic fervour. As the ship docked, several men and boys began to cheer it; 20-year-old student Henrik Wergeland shouted "Long live the Constitution!" This instigated a larger response from the crowd, who spontaneously began singing the anthems from the previously circulated flyers. The crowd then moved to Stortorvet, the square in front of Oslo Cathedral, and remained there into the evening.

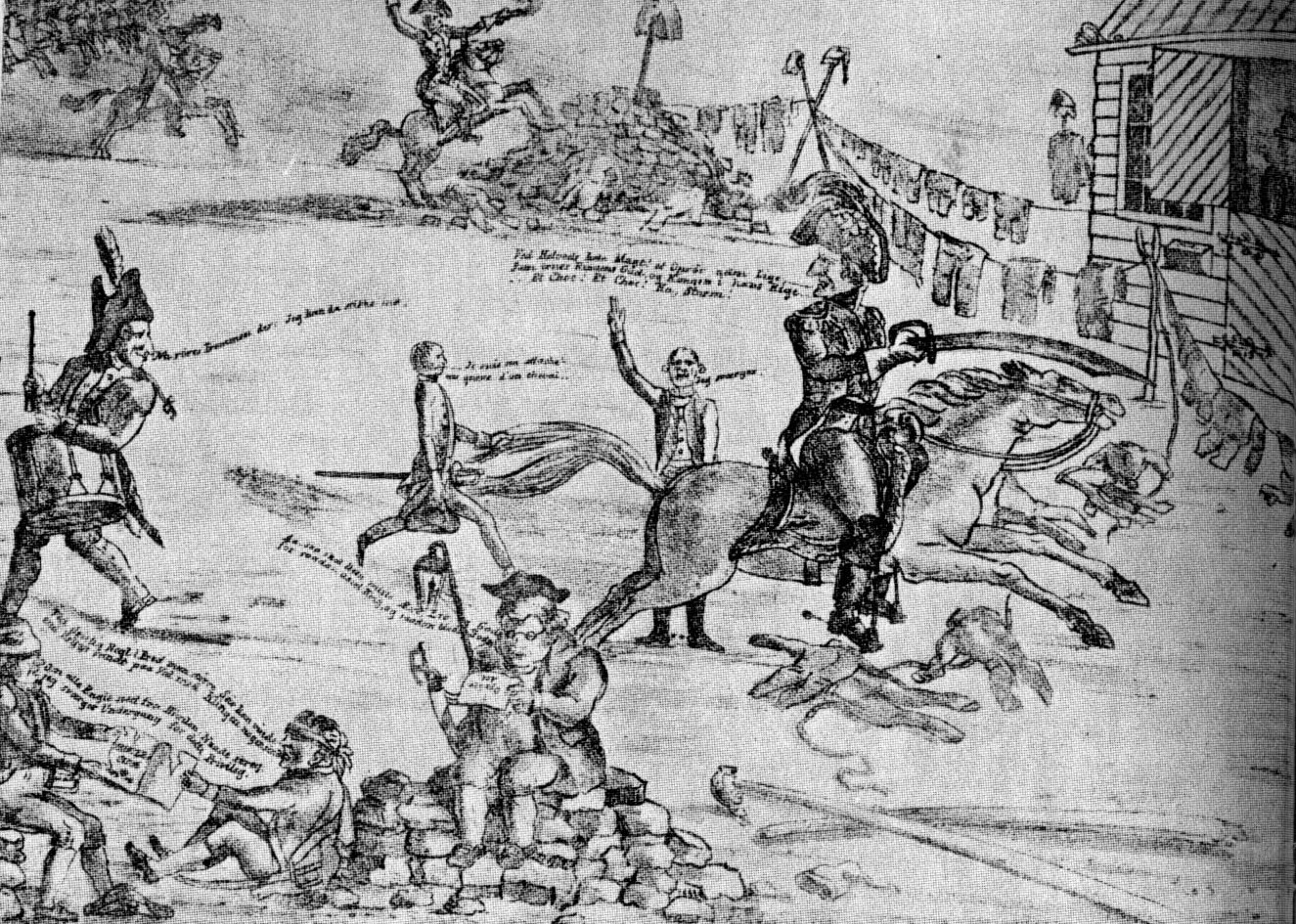
Drawing of the 'battle' by Henrik Wergeland for his farcical play Phantasmer, published in August 1829.

=== Military intervention ===
The Christiania police force consisted of the politimester (chief of police) Ole Gjerdrum, two deputies and nine regular policemen, with twenty volunteer auxiliaries also available. This small complement was normally sufficient for a town of Christiania's size, but was inadequate for the developing situation. Faced with the gathering in Stortorvet, the police summoned the auxiliaries and requested the crowd to disperse, but people were curious and refused to leave. A drunken man, wearing a hat with the inscription "Long live 17 May" was brought in for questioning, but was eventually released because he was unable to explain himself.

In response to the deteriorating situation, the Swedish Viceroy Baltzar von Platen and Major-General Baron Wedel-Jarlsberg, the Norwegian commandant of the garrison at Akershus Fortress, sought a legal justification to disperse the crowd. They settled on the Riot Act of 1685, which prohibited revolt. Gjerdrum was sent to the square to read the relevant clauses of the Riot Act and order the crowd to disperse, but he had inadequate stature and was largely ignored. Wedel-Jarlsberg then ordered cavalry into the square; some people were ridden down and a stampede ensued. The cavalry were joined by light infantry who began beating demonstrators with rifles. Among those injured was Wergeland, who was struck by the flat of a cavalry sabre. Fortunately, nobody was killed or seriously wounded, but in all around thirty civilians suffered significant injuries in the melee.

=== Aftermath ===
In the wake of the 'battle', six men were arrested - Frederik Christian Blehrs, Ole Eilertsen, Andreas Hansen, Hans Myhre, Christian Mortensen and Andreas Høyer - for public drunkenness and/or disorder, though they were all soon released.

Wergeland subsequently wrote to politimester Gjerdrum and Major-General Wedel-Jarlsberg complaining about damage done to his student uniform during the scuffle, leading to a long-running exchange of letters which the politically savvy Wergeland was able to spin to his advantage. Wergeland's subsequent questioning by the police made him a public hero and figurehead of Norwegian nationalism. He hinted that the Baron had not been entirely sober that day; the quotation was omitted from the record but remembered by Wergeland's cousin, who was present. Most famously, when asked to state his age, Wergeland replied, "I am six years older than the Norwegian Constitution. I hope the present gentlemen remember when that constitution was written." This line in particular gave Wergeland the honour of "initiating the day".

Around Norway there was great anger toward the Swedes and the governor in particular. It became a matter of heated discussion in Norwegian newspapers for a year afterwards. To defuse the tensions, King Charles XIV John agreed to lift the prohibition on constitutional celebrations on 17 May. It has been celebrated ever since as Norway's national day.
