= SS Constitutionen =

Norwegian steamship

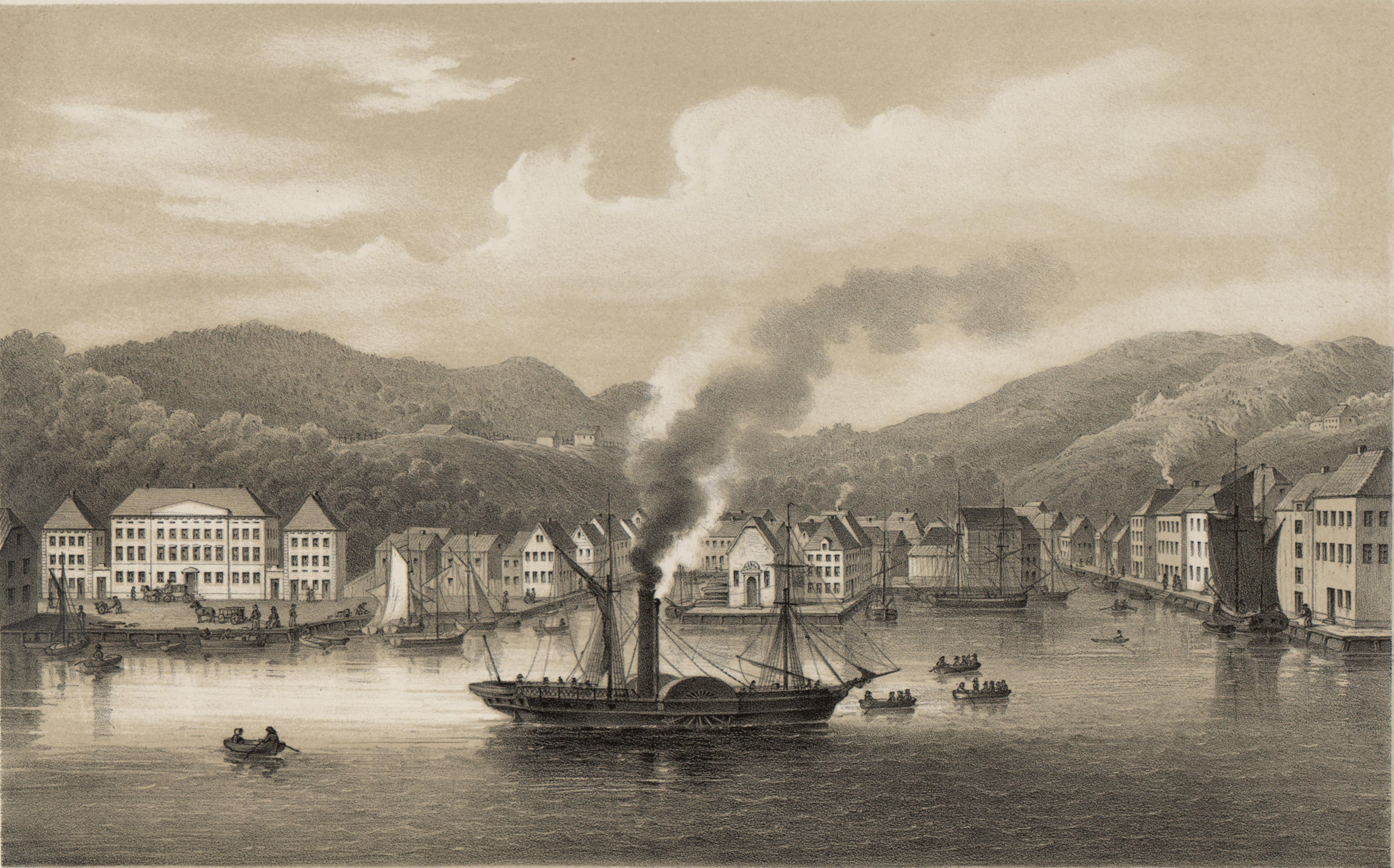
- SS Constitutionen at the harbour of Arendal

History

Norway
- Name: SS Constitutionen
- Route: Christiania—Bergen
- Launched: 1826
- Fate: Scrapped, 1871

General characteristics
- Type: Paddle steamer
- Tonnage: ca. 200 tons
- Length: 99 ft (30 m)
- Beam: 17 ft (5.2 m)
- Propulsion: 2 × Horseley Ironworks 30 hp (22 kW) steam engines
- Speed: About 7 knots (13 km/h; 8.1 mph)
- Capacity: 32 passengers

SS Constitutionen was a paddle steamer constructed in England and imported to Norway in 1826. It was the first steamship of Norway, and was used for passenger traffic between Christiania and Bergen. It was scrapped in 1871. A long-term captain of Constitutionen was Peter Severin Steenstrup, later founder and manager of the workshop Akers Mekaniske Verksted.

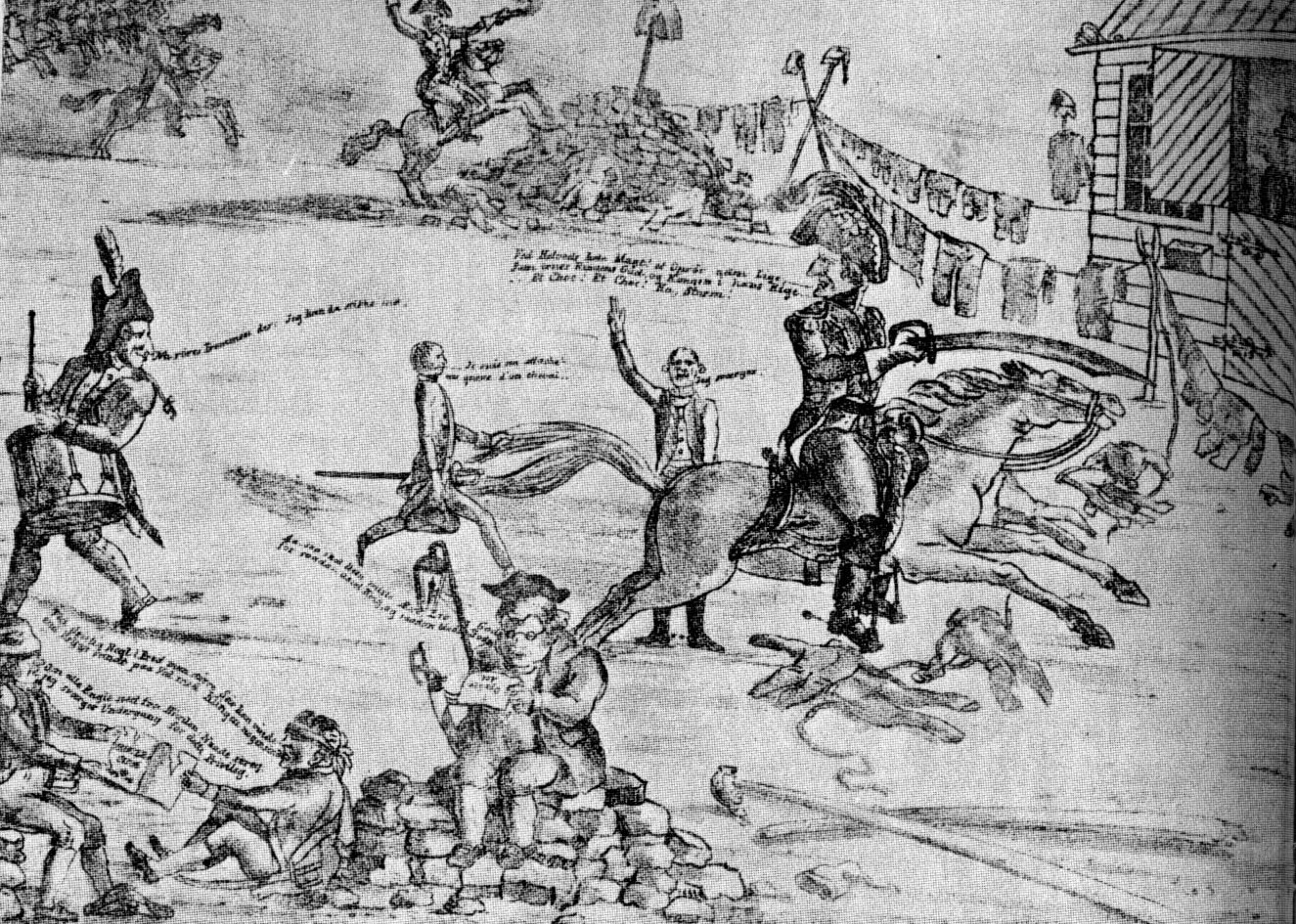
Drawing by Henrik Wergeland, picturing the "battle at the market place" at Stortorvet, Christiania.

An incident involving the ship happened in Christiania on 17 May 1829, on the Norwegian Constitution Day, when a crowd of people welcomed the arrival of the ship with greetings like Leve Constitutionen. The commander of Akershus met the crowd with armed cavalry, the so-called Torgslaget, an event which eventually influenced the population's attitude to the Swedish authorities.
