= Safety automation system =

- Type: Automation system
- Other name: Safety and automation system
- Abbreviation: SAS
- Main functions: Control and monitoring
- Introduced by: Honeywell
- Inception: 1970s

A safety automation system, also known as safety and automation system, abbreviated as SAS, is a safety-related system designed to conduct one or more safety automation functions. It mainly provides control and monitoring functions, and operates independently from other systems. The system can immediately and automatically act when a danger alert is generated. An earlier SAS product was the Teleperm XS.

SAS products are mainly applied in the industries of petroleum, chemical, pharmaceuticals, building, and nuclear power plant control system. In the 1990s, Norway developed the NORSOK Standards, among which the I-002 Standard was specifically designed for SASs in the petroleum industry. The representative SAS product manufacturers include Norfass, ABB, Chenzhu, and Kongsberg.

== History ==
In 1975, Honeywell introduced the TDC 2000, which was one of the earliest safety automation systems. In 1980, Siemens launched another SAS product.
