= Peder Christian Holst =

Norwegian politician, military officer and businessperson

Peder Christian Holst (27 April 1798 – 14 December 1873) was a Norwegian politician, military officer and businessperson.

He served in the Parliament of Norway during the terms 1839–1841 and 1842–1844, representing the constituency Smaalenenes Amt, and during the terms 1848–1850 and 1851–1853, representing the constituency Kongsberg. He was mayor of Kongsberg in 1847, 1849 and 1850, and deputy mayor in 1845, 1846 and 1852.

He was also the director of Kongsberg Våpenfabrikk from 1852 to 1854.
