= Peter Severin Steenstrup =

Norwegian naval officer and businessperson

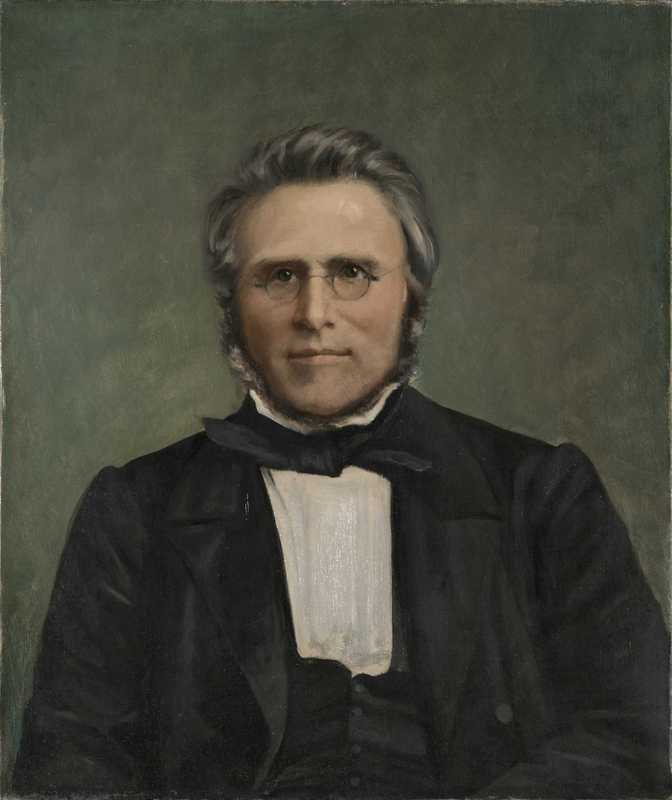
1860 painting of Peter Severin Steenstrup, by Peter Nicolai Arbo

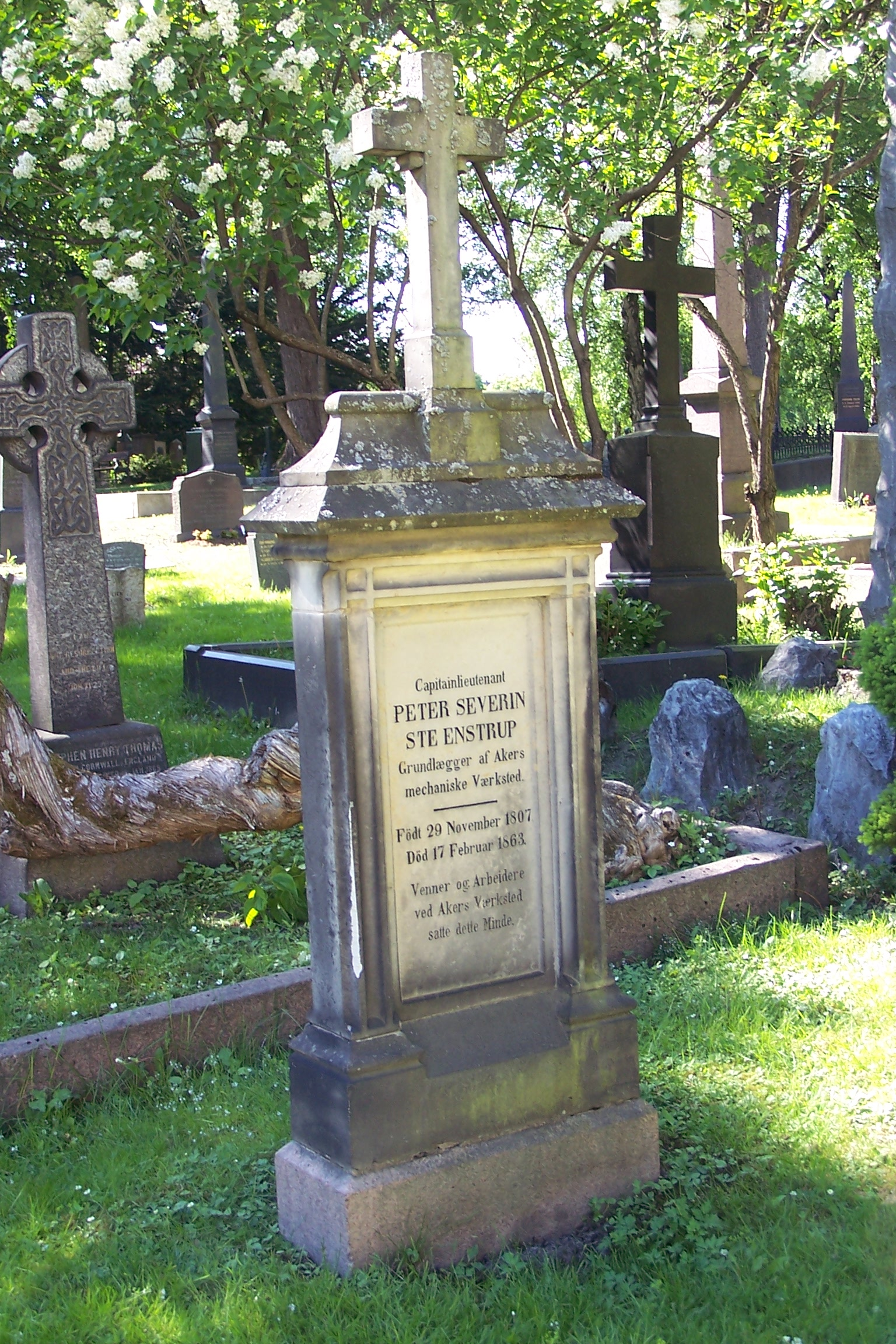
Steenstrup's headstone at the Vår Frelsers gravlund

Peter Severin Steenstrup (29 November 1807 – 17 February 1863) was a Norwegian naval officer and businessperson.

He was the son of Constitutional founding father and businessman Poul Steenstrup and Thea Collett.

He served as captain of the paddle steamer SS Constitutionen, the first steamship of Norway. Steenstrup was a Lieutenant Commander in the Royal Norwegian Navy, and founded the shipbuilding company Akers Mekaniske Verksted in Christiania. He was one of the founders of the Norwegian Polytechnic Society, and was its chairman from 1853 to 1854.

In April 1835 he married his second cousin Sophie Augusta Collett (1811–1872). Sophie Augusta Collett was the daughter of Johan Collett and niece of Jonas Collett, both of whom were Constitutional founding fathers. In addition she was the sister of Peter Jonas Collett, and as such sister-in-law of writer Camilla Collett. Their son Peter Steenstrup became a military officer as well. He married Marie Hiorth Kielland in July 1873.

Peter Severin Steenstrup was buried at the Vår Frelsers gravlund. A street in Oslo, Steenstrups gate was named for him.

Preceded by Oluf Nicolai Roll	Chairman of the Norwegian Polytechnic Society; 1853–1854	Succeeded by Oluf Pihl
