= Kongsberg Mesotech =

Manufacturer of sonar equipment for underwater imaging and detection

Kongsberg Mesotech Ltd, based in Port Coquitlam, BC, Canada, is informally operated by Kongsberg Gruppen. Website Proff.no does not include the company on the lists of subsidiaries of Kongsberg Gruppen or Kongsberg Maritime.

Mesotech make underwater surveillance and advanced frogman detection sonar systems.

The company was formed in 1973 to design and manufacture underwater acoustic equipment. Today Kongsberg Mesotech Ltd. supplies a worldwide customer base with a range of products for military, fisheries, oilfield, scientific, and other offshore market applications.

== Product range ==
Kongsberg Mesotech's Vancouver office is responsible for the design, manufacture and sales of underwater acoustic products, including:

- Imaging and profiling mechanically scanned sonars
- Multibeam imaging sonars
- Multibeam profiling sonar
- Multibeam diver detection sonar
- Altimeters

Kongsberg Mesotech makes over 100 models of multibeam, scanning, side scan, echo sounder, and altimeter sonar combinations.

== Scanning sonar ==
Kongsberg Mesotech's breakthrough came in 1982 with the development of the Model 971 Scanning Sonar. This high resolution scanning sonar was quickly accepted by military and offshore oilfield market users, and soon became a standard for all ROV operations. In 1984 Mesotech was awarded the "Special Meritorious Award for Engineering Innovation" for the 971 Sonar by Petroleum Engineering International, and Pipeline & Gas Journal magazines.

== Multibeam sonar ==
In 1997, the Kongsberg Mesotech introduced the SM 2000 Multibeam Sonar, the FS 925 Forward Scanning Trawl Sonar and the MS 900D Digital Telemetry Mechanically Scanned Sonar Processor. In 1999 the PC-based MS 1000 Scanning Sonar Processor, and the 1071-series of scanning sonar heads and altimeters were added to the suite of Kongsberg Mesotech equipment.

== See also ==
- Subsidiary – Company owned or controlled by another company
- Anti-frogman techniques – Methods of protection from incursions by divers and swimmers
