= Oslo Bazaars =

Building in Oslo, Norway

Coordinates: 59°54′43″N 10°44′50″E

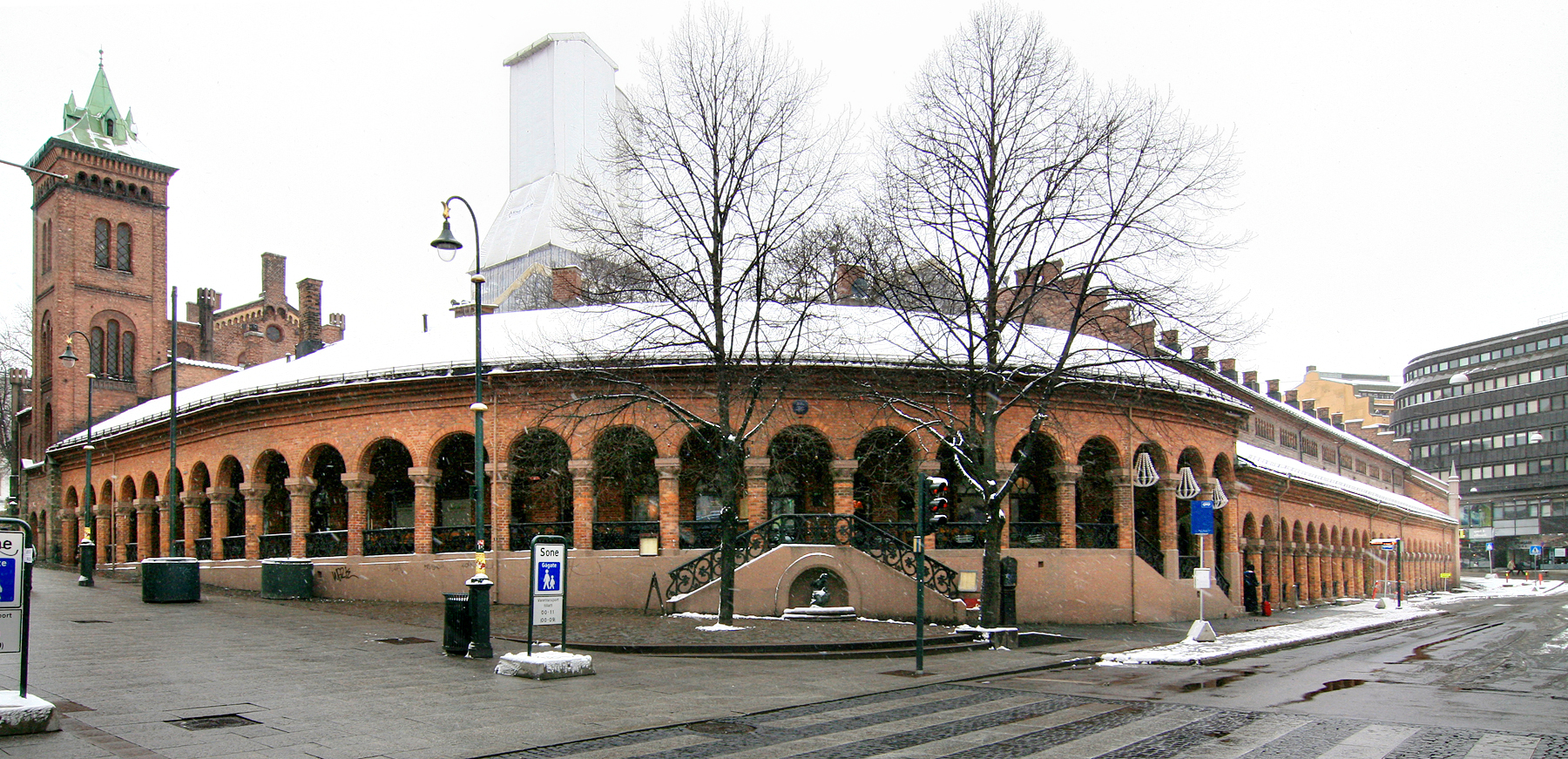
The Bazaars seen from the crossroad of Karl Johans gate and Dronningens gate Dronningens gate

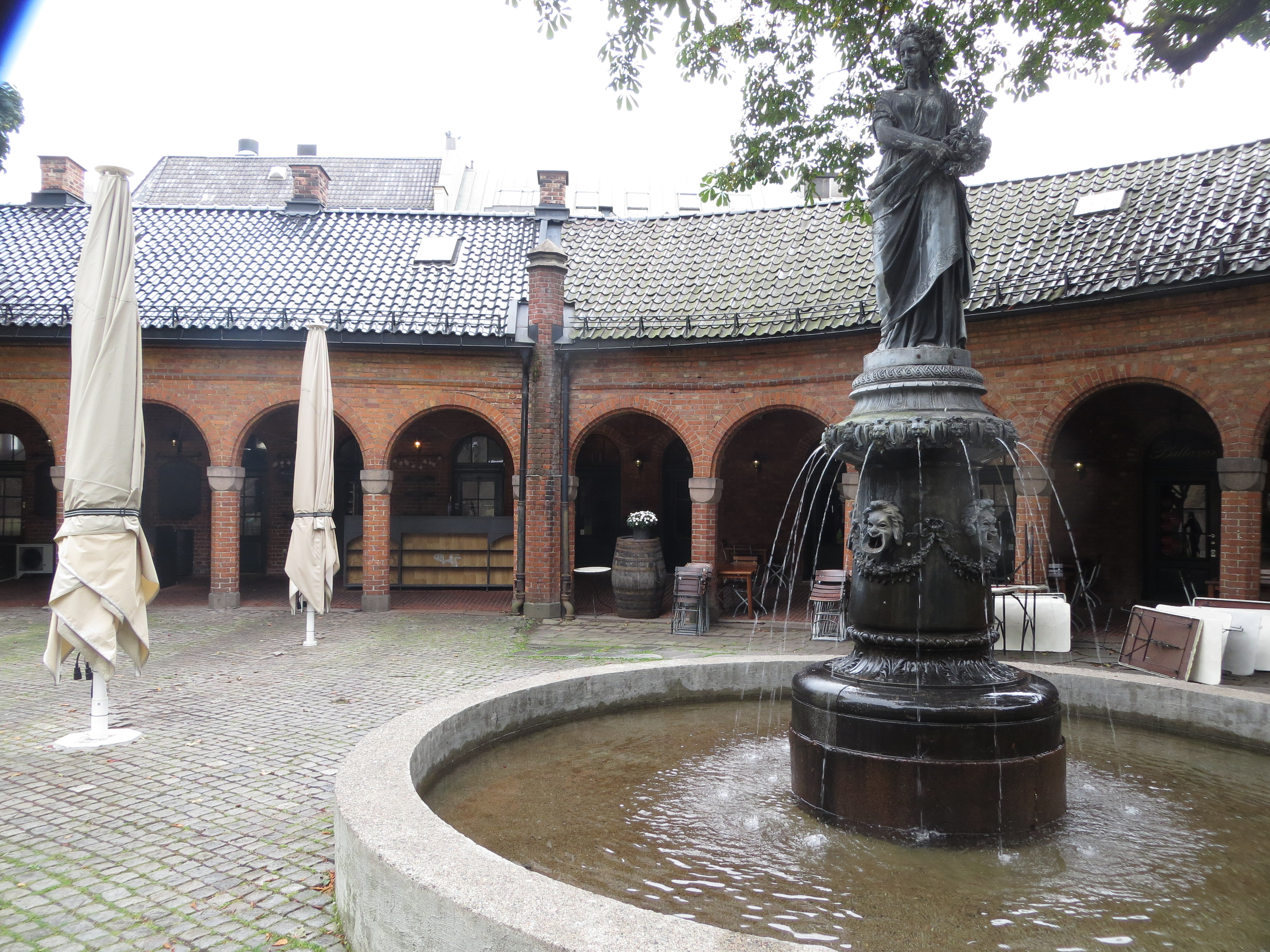
The Bazaars, inside towards the market place

Oslo Bazaars (Basarene Kirkeristen) are located at Oslo Cathedral, along the streets Karl Johans gate and Dronningens gate in Oslo, Norway. The buildings of the bazaar constitute a continuous facility that encircles three sides of the quarter with Oslo Cathedral.

== History ==
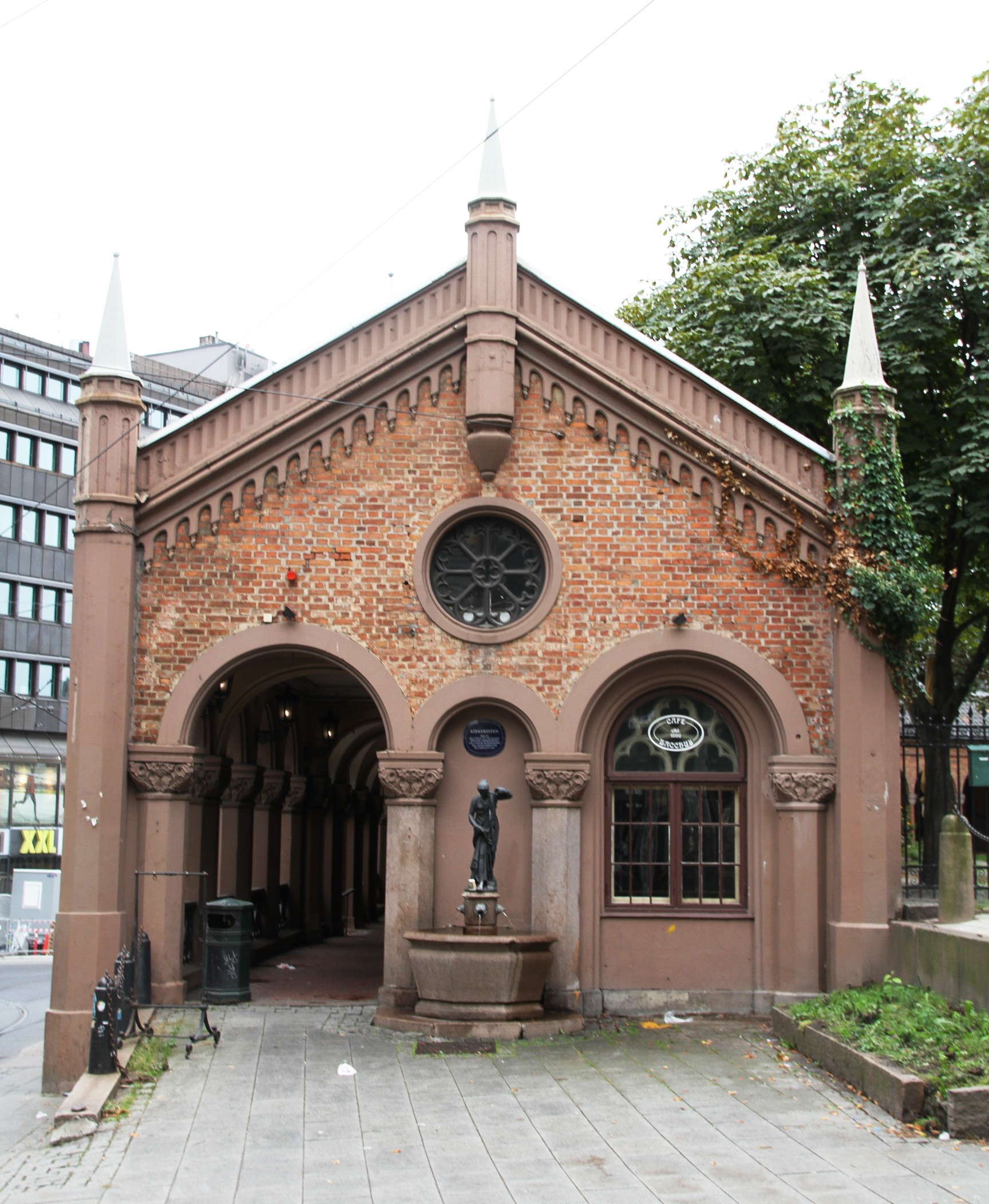
Entrance to inner courtroom

The Oslo Bazaars were constructed between 1841 and 1859 and have facades of untreated red brick. They were designed in Romanesque Revival architecture style by Christian Heinrich Grosch who acted as the city's chief architect, planning engineer, and building inspector. Originally built for butchers who sold meat at the nearby Stortorvet market place, they were later expanded after their size proved insufficient. Construction continued along the same design in a semicircle to the east of the church, with more than 50 stalls in total.

On several occasions, the buildings were considered for demolition as part of a beautification plan for Oslo Cathedral. In 1927, the Oslo City Council voted against demolition supported by the arguments of architect Harald Hals (1876–1959) who served as chief of city planning from 1926 to 1947. Today the bazaar halls are listed as a protected site.

In 2025 the site was sold from then owner Oslo Municipality to two private companies (Fauna Eiendom and Andenergy).

== Gallery ==
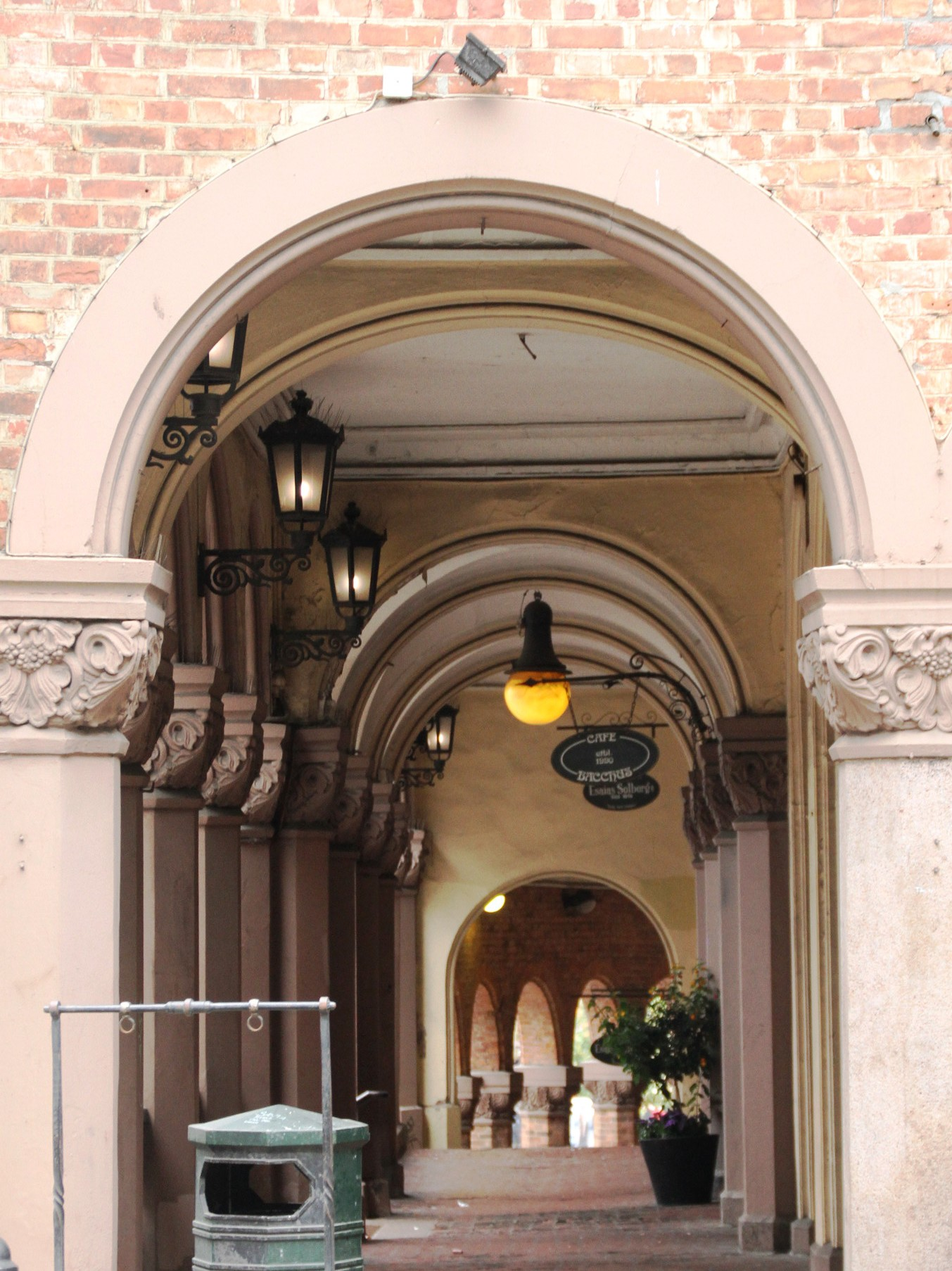

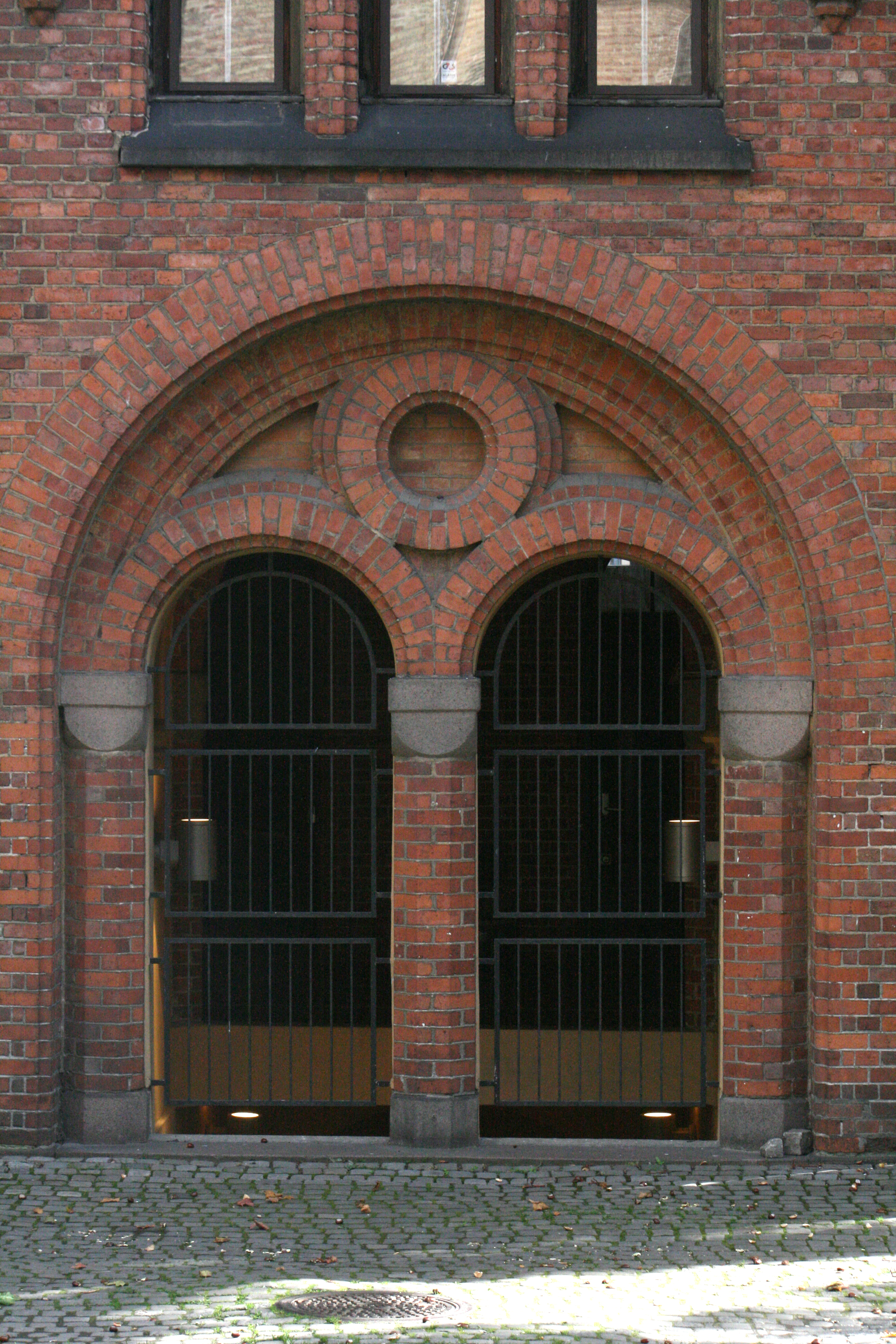

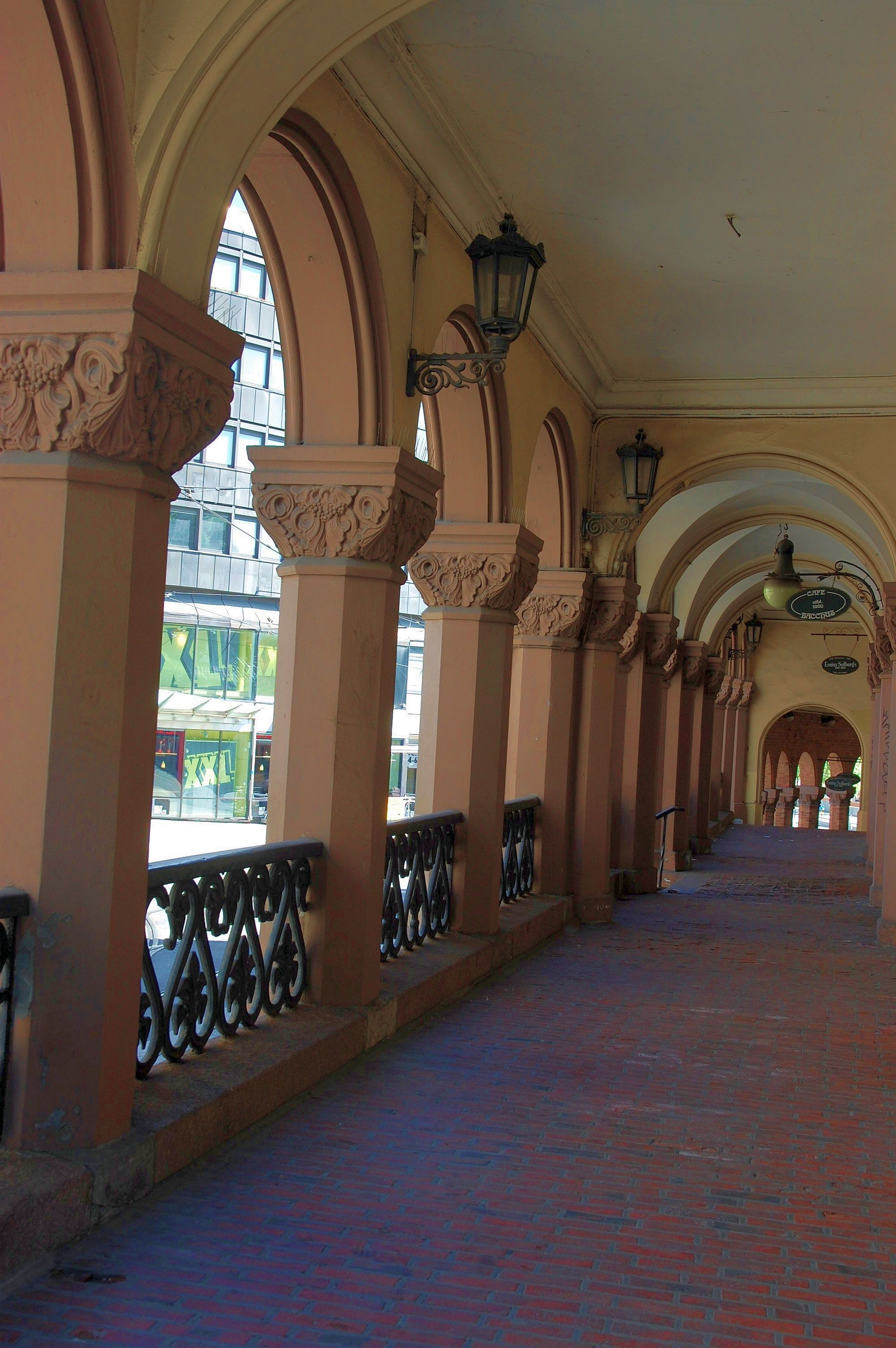

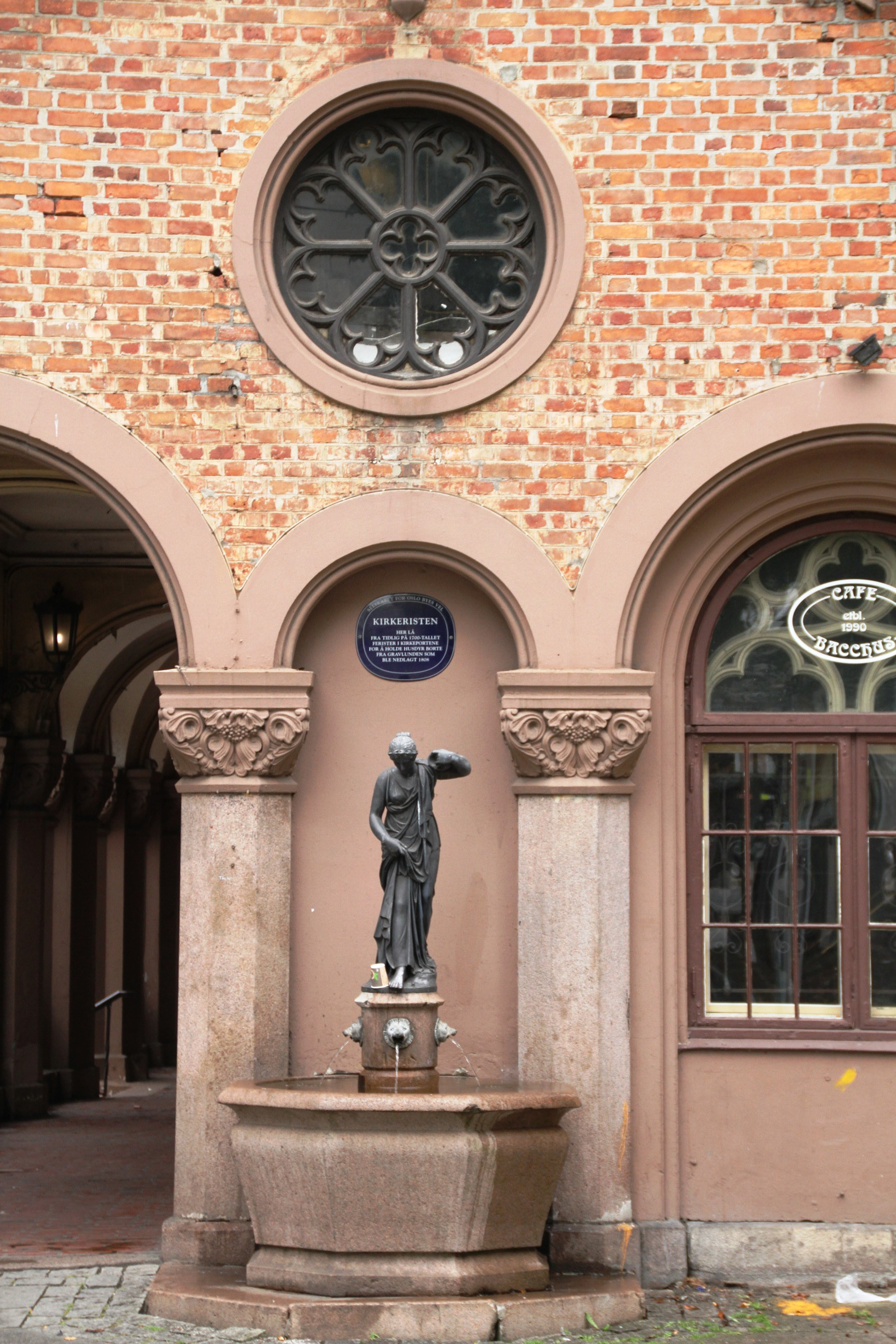

== See also ==
- Bazaar
- Market (place)
- Retail
