= Poul Steenstrup =

Norwegian industrialist and politician

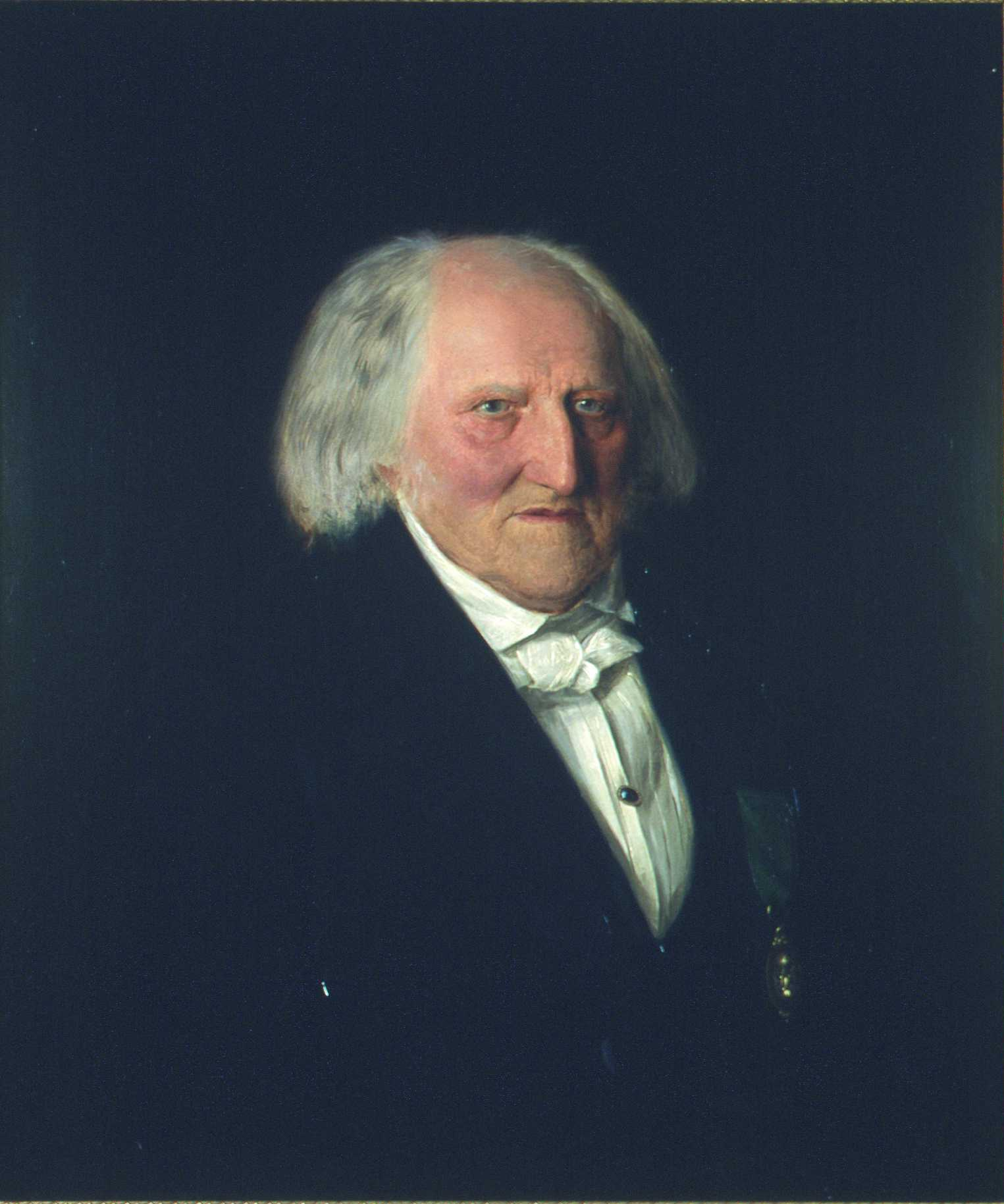
- Born: 10 December 1772; Egtved, in Vejle, Denmark.
- Died: 9 October 1864 (aged 91)
- Occupations: Businessman and industrial entrepreneur
- Known for: Member of the Norwegian Constituent Assembly in 1814

Poul Steenstrup (10 December 1772 – 9 October 1864) was a Norwegian industrialist and politician. He was the founder of the Kongsberg Arms Factory (Kongsberg Våpenfabrikk) and served as a representative at the Norwegian Constituent Assembly in 1814.

== Biography ==
Poul Steenstrup was born the son of a Danish landowner at Egtved, in Vejle, Denmark. He studied surgery and science at the University of Copenhagen but did not take the final examination. In 1797, he came to Buskerud in Norway where he attended the Royal Norwegian Mining Academy (kongelige norske Mining Academy) in Kongsberg. From 1801 he undertook a three-year scholarship trip to German and Austrian ironworks and factories, principally in Freiberg and Vienna.

Upon returning to Norway, he served as mining inspector at the Kongsberg Silver Mines. He was superintendent and manager of Kongsberg Ironworks (Kongsberg Jernverk) from the start of operations in 1809 until it was privatized in 1824. In 1813 he managed to win the backing of Prince Regent Christian Frederik (later Christian VIII of Denmark) to establish Norway's first factory, the Kongsberg Arms Factory (Kongsberg Våpenfabrikk) which opened in 1814. He was director of the Kongsberg Silver Mines from 1833 to 1840.

Poul Steenstrup represented Kongsberg at the Norwegian Constituent Assembly in 1814. He was associated with the independence party (Selvstendighetspartiet). Steenstrup was also a member of the Norwegian Parliament during 1824-1826.

== Personal life ==
Poul Steenstrup was married to Mathea Bernardine Collett (1779-1847), daughter of timber merchant Peter Collett. They were the parents of eight children including Peter Severin Steenstrup.

== Honors ==
He was appointed Knight of the Swedish Order of Vasa in 1816.

== Memorials ==
- A bust of Poul Steenstrup was unveiled during 1914. The current location of the bust is at Prestegårdsparken in Kongsberg.
- Steenstrups Gate in Kongsberg was also named in his honor.

== See also ==
- Kongsberg Gruppen

== Related reading ==
- Holme Jørn (2014) De kom fra alle kanter - Eidsvollsmennene og deres hus (Oslo: Cappelen Damm) ISBN 978-82-02-44564-5
