= Stortorvets Gjæstgiveri =

Stortorvets Gjæstgiveri^{(restaurant)}

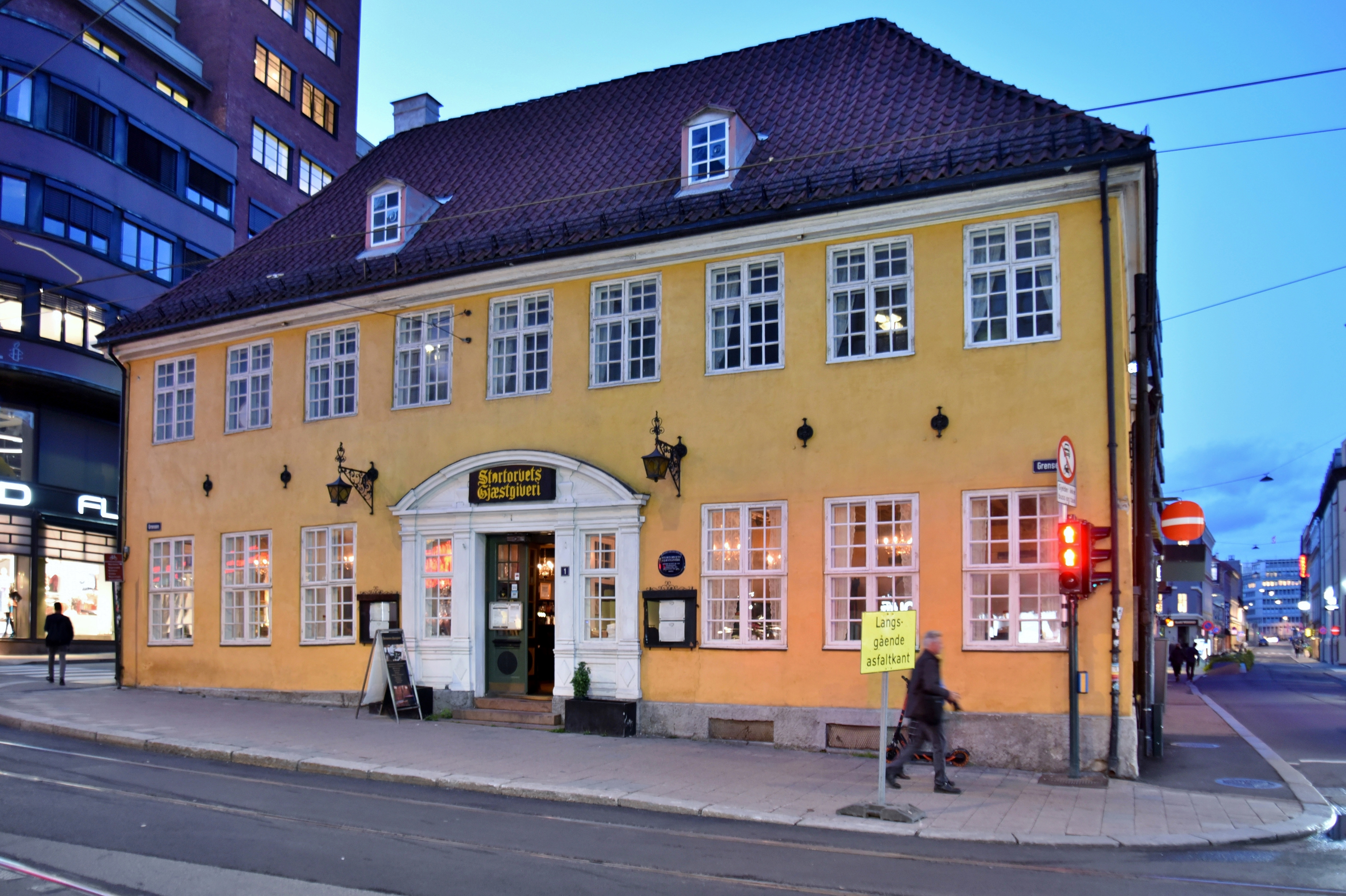
- Stortorvets Gjæstgiveri in 2019

- Stortorvets Gjæstgiveri in Oslo

Restaurant information
- Established: 1903
- Food type: Norwegian cuisine
- Location: Grensen 1, Oslo, N-0159, Norway
- Coordinates: 59°54′48.283″N 10°44′41.377″E
- Website: stortorvets-gjestgiveri.no

Stortorvets Gjæstgiveri is a traditional Norwegian restaurant house in Oslo, Norway. It is located in a building from the early 18th century that is cultural heritage site. The restaurant was opened after an extensive restoration of the building in 1903. One corner is facing Stortorvet square in central Oslo. The building is two-storey, timber framed and gable roof, covered with roof tiles. The walls are not in a fully horizontal position. The building was finished at about the same time as Oslo Cathedral on the opposite side of the square.

There has been restaurants in the building since the 19th century.

The building is listed and protected by law by the Norwegian Directorate for Cultural Heritage.

The building houses both the restaurant (titled guest house), the party room in the first floor, the Gamle Christiania (nicknamed "Gamla") venue (live music) in the ground floor, as well as the Blaze Go-Go Bar strip club in the basement. No accommodation is offered.

The dining restaurant Stortorvets Gjæstgiveri serves dishes, inspired by the traditional Norwegian cuisine, at affordable prices according to Norwegian conditions.
