= Kongsberg Maritime =

Norwegian technology company

- Type: Public
- Traded as: Oslo Stock Exchange: KMAR
- Industry: Solutions for merchant marine, offshore and subsea
- Founded: 1814
- Headquarters: Kongsberg, Norway
- Area served: Global
- Key people: Lisa Edvardsen Haugan (Executive Vice President)
- Revenue: ▲NOK 7,545 million (2018)
- Number of employees: 7,600 (1. April 2019)
- Parent: Kongsberg Gruppen
- Website: https://www.kongsbergmaritime.com/

Kongsberg Maritime (KM) is a Norwegian technology enterprise and used to be a part of Kongsberg Gruppen (KOG). Kongsberg Maritime deliver systems for positioning, surveying, navigation, and automation to merchant vessels and offshore installations. Their most well known products exist within dynamic positioning systems, marine automation and surveillance systems, process automation, satellite navigation, and hydroacoustics.

== History ==
Kongsberg Maritime's history dates back to 1946. Simonsen Radio, later Simrad, was founded on 31 December that year; its first product was a radio telephone for the fishing fleet. The first echo sounder for the commercial fishing fleet came on the market in 1950. The first alarm system was ready in 1959.

Kongsberg Maritime is part of Norway’s long industrial and technological heritage, with roots tracing back to the Kongsberg environment established in 1814.

1814–1987 (Early history): The company’s origins date back to the establishment of Kongsberg Våpenfabrikk in 1814.

The maritime business itself began to take shape after World War II, particularly with the founding of Simrad in 1946, which developed early communication and echo sounding equipment for the fishing fleet.

1970s: The technology company firmly established itself in the maritime sector alongside oil exploration and offshore activity in the North Sea.

1990s: Kongsberg Gruppen was established in its current form. The maritime division was formally separated as an independent company in 1998, building on acquisitions such as Norcontrol.

2000s: The company experienced strong international growth and became a global leader in advanced systems for dynamic positioning (DP), underwater robotics, ship design, and navigation.

April 2026: Kongsberg Maritime was demerged from Kongsberg Gruppen and listed as an independent, publicly traded company on the Oslo Stock Exchange (ticker: KMAR), strengthening its independent position and creating new growth opportunities.

Kongsberg Maritime has over the years absorbed a number of well known maritime and offshore related companies, including:

- Autronica
- Consultas
- Contros
- Embient
- GeoAcoustics
- KonMap
- Kongsberg Mesotech
- NorControl
- Rolls-Royce Commercial Marine
- Seatex
- Simrad

== Products ==
The main product areas for Kongsberg Maritime are:

- Deck systems
  Includes complete seismic back-deck systems, seismic cable control, marine and offshore cranes and helideck monitoring.
- Dynamic positioning systems
  Control systems that make it possible to keep a vessel/platform in the same position under demanding weather conditions.
- Navigation systems
  Radar, digital chart systems (ECDIS), steering systems and integrated navigation equipment for ship's bridges.
- Hydroacoustics, echo sounder, sonars
  High technology hydroacoustic products for seabed surveying, subsea communication and positioning.
- Autonomous underwater vehicles & marine robotic systems
  Free-swimming autonomous underwater vehicles characterized by great manoeuvrability and high accuracy for civilian and military use including the HUGIN Family of AUVs (HUGIN, HUGIN Egde, HUGIN Superior and HUGIN Endurance). Other marine robotic systems include the Sounder autonomous Uncrewed Surface Vessel (USV) for scientific and survey tasks, and Eelume, a free swimming resident robot for subsea inspection and observation operations.
- Marine automation and surveillance systems
  Systems for surveillance and for controlling engines, cargo and propulsion on vessels.
- Motion sensors, GPS, AIS and position reference systems
  Automatic systems for recording vessel identification, position, movement and cargo (AIS - Automatic Identification Systems). GPS satellite positioning systems.
- Naval systems
  Acoustic monitoring and tracking systems, homeland security systems, naval sonars transponders and pingers.
- Sensors and transmitters
  Sensors to measure temperature, pressure, tank level, motion and dissolved gases.
- Tank gauging
  Systems to measure, monitor and control liquid cargos.
- Underwater and harsh environment camera systems
  Underwater cameras, imaging technology and products to the Offshore Oilfield, Scientific, Maritime and Naval sectors.

In Q4 2026, the company launched "Arctic Hunter USV", for use by Britain's navy; it is a [class of] vessels for ASW.
