= Kongsberg Gruppen =

Norwegian industrial company

Kongsberg Gruppen ASA
- Type: Public
- Traded as: Oslo Stock Exchange: KOG
- ISIN: NO0003043309
- Industry: Shipbuilding, defense, aerospace, offshore oil and gas industries.
- Founded: March 20, 1814; 212 years ago
- Headquarters: Kongsberg, Norway
- Area served: Global
- Key people: Eivind Reiten (chairman); Geir Håøy (CEO)
- Products: Ships, missiles, remote controlled weapon stations
- Revenue: ▲48.9 billion kr (2024)
- Operating income: ▲6.51 billion kr (2024)
- Net income: ▲5.13 billion kr (2024)
- Total assets: ▲69.4 billion kr (2024)
- Total equity: ▲19.3 billion kr (2024)
- Owner: Ministry of Trade, Industry and Fisheries (50.004%)
- Number of employees: 14,629 (2024)
- Subsidiaries: Kongsberg Defence & Aerospace, Kongsberg Digital
- Website: www.kongsberg.com

Kongsberg Gruppen ASA is a Norwegian multinational company based in Kongsberg that supplies high-technology systems to customers in the merchant marine, defence, aerospace, offshore oil and gas industries, and renewable and utilities industries.

The company comprises four business areas: Kongsberg Discovery, Kongsberg Defence & Aerospace, and Kongsberg Digital. In 2018, Kongsberg had revenues of NOK 14.381 billion, and 6,842 employees in more than 25 countries.

Kongsberg is a continuation of Kongsberg Weapons Factory (Kongsberg Våpenfabrikk - KV) (1814–1987). After KV's restructuring in 1987 following the Toshiba–Kongsberg scandal, defence activities continued as the company Norsk Forsvarsteknologi (NFT). In 1995 the company changed its name to Kongsberg Gruppen.

Kongsberg was listed on the Oslo Stock Exchange in 1993 and is a public company. The Norwegian Ministry of Trade, Industry and Fisheries is the largest shareholder with a 50.004 percent interest.

Markets outside of Norway pose a growing and increasingly important part of business and represented approximately 80% of revenue in 2015.

== History ==
The company's origin and background dates back to the early 1600s.

The discovery of silver in the mountains around Kongsberg in 1624 meant that the city became an important mineral resource for the Danish Norwegian kingdom. When the Danish-Norwegian union was dissolved about 200 years later there was a need to build up a strong defence that would contribute to independence and security for Norway.

There was a need for a domestic defence industry, and Kongsberg already had expertise after centuries of mining. On 20 March 1814 Poul Steenstrup founded Kongsberg Våpenfabrikk.

=== 1813–1890: Origins ===
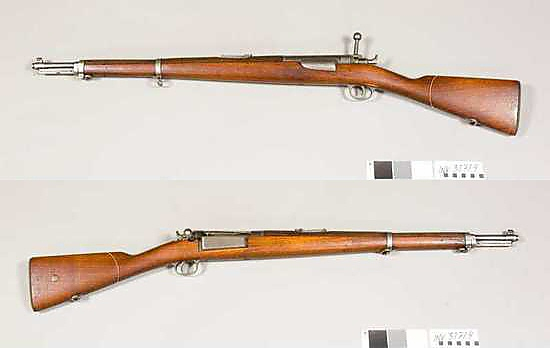
Danish M.1889 Carbine

1813 was an important year for Norway. The nation wrote its constitution and the weapons factory was one of the nation's first industrial factories.

Kongsberg Silver Mines experienced a recession and as a consequence Kongsberg suffered distress and poverty. There was a need to create new jobs. In addition Norway was marked by the desire for national independence, and the Weapons factory would make the newly established state self-supplied with weapons.

Kongsberg's mining traditions - established over several centuries - provided a good basis for building a knowledge-based business. Skilled mining engineers were now assigned to develop the new company.

The Weapons Factory quickly began producing rifles for the Norwegian Armed Forces. A number of models were developed and delivered throughout the 19th century. The major international breakthrough came in 1888 when director Ole Herman Johannes Krag and corps gunsmith Erik Jørgensen showcased a new type of rifle.

=== 1890–1900: International breakthrough ===
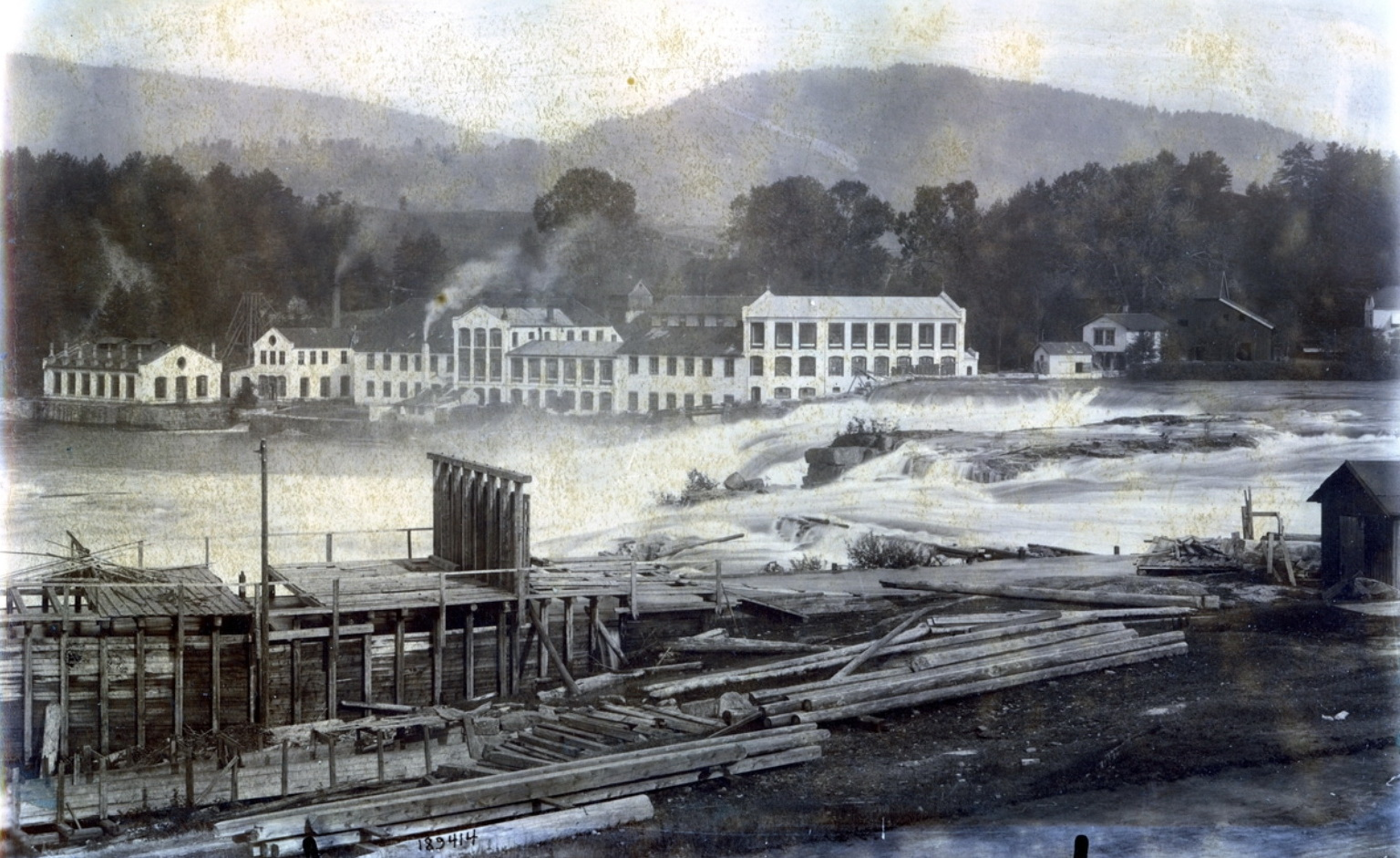
Kongsberg Våpenfabrikk, photographed by Jules David in 1899

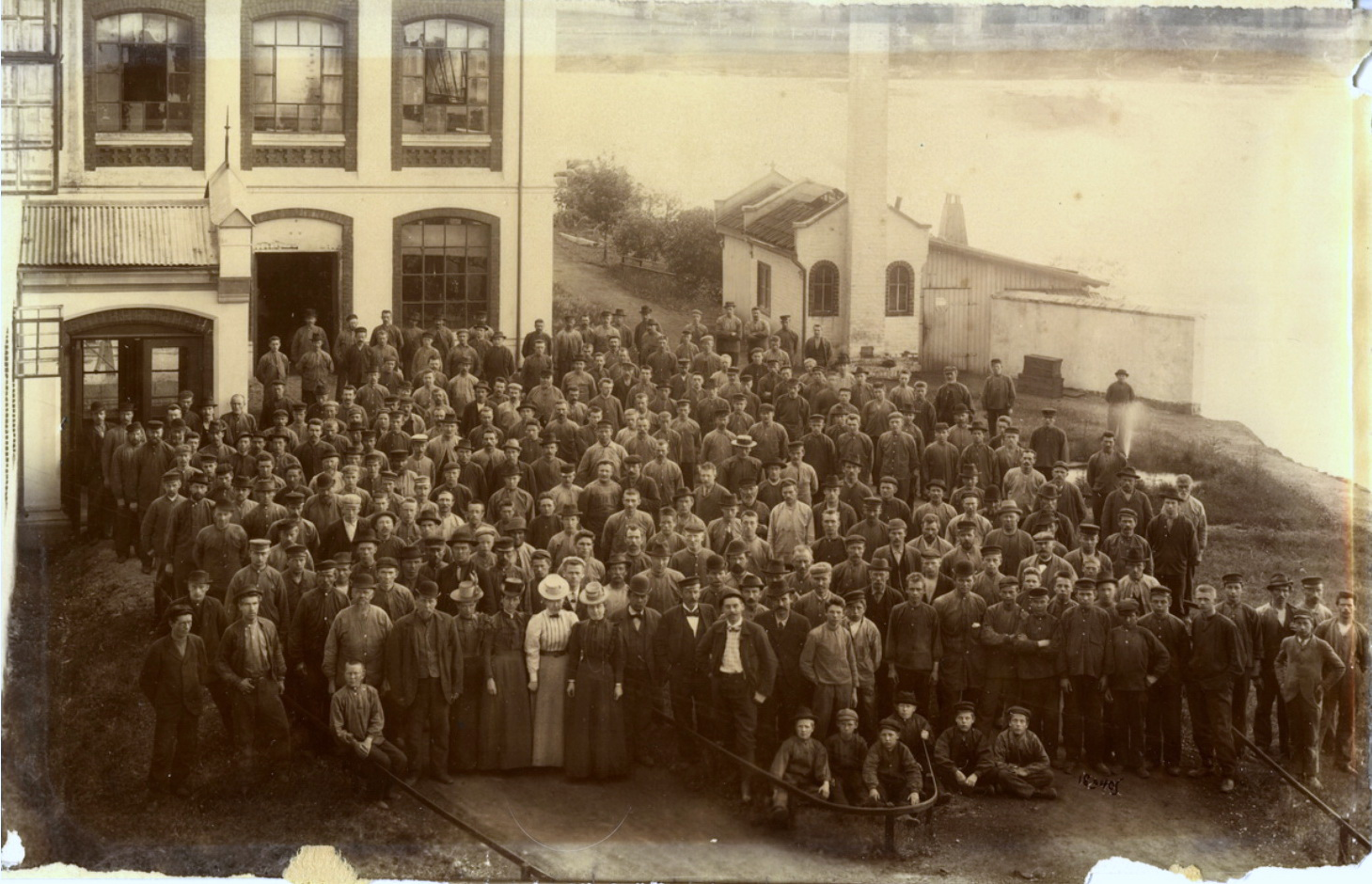
Personnel group photograph by Jules David, 1899

International breakthrough came with the Krag–Jørgensen rifle in 1892.

The officer Ole Herman Johannes Krag and gunsmith Erik Jørgensen wanted to produce a new type of precision rifle, which was both easy to use, inexpensive to manufacture and which had revolutionary functionality. The rifle's mechanism proved to be something quite revolutionary in the arms industry.

The Krag–Jørgensen rifle was first adopted as a service rifle by the Danish Army in 1889. Three years later the rifle became a world-known concept when the United States decided to equip their soldiers with the rifle. "The Krag" turned out to be one of the first major export contracts for the Norwegian industry. During a six-year period the U.S. alone produced well over half a million rifles on licence.

In 1894 the weapon was adopted as army rifle for the Norwegian Army. The weapon was in service until World War II.

"The Krag" became Norway's first large-scale industrial export and helped to establish an important relationship with the U.S. military.

=== 1900–1945: Modernization ===
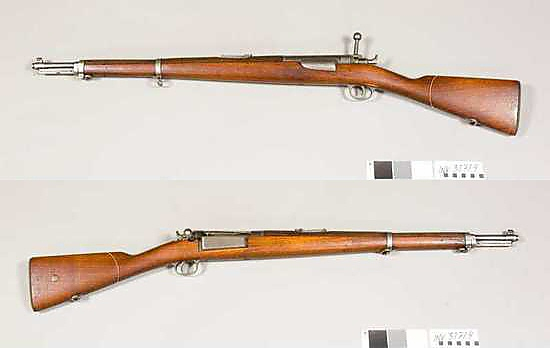
Danish M.1889 Carbine

The Krag–Jørgensen rifle dominated production at Kongsberg until the end of World War I. When the war was over there was a significant decline in military orders. The company therefore used its position and expertise from the defence industry to enter new markets and seek new business opportunities.

Production of civilian products such as civil weapons, tools, and parts for the shipping industry and whaling fleet began 1918. Other departments made bicycle components, while the cannon department made shafts, connecting rods, forgings and whale guns.

Kongsberg launched its first civil products in 1921. The products won gold medal at the World Exposition in Barcelona in 1929.

During World War II Kongsberg was under German control. Production, however, never came up to such numbers as the occupation forces wanted. This was partly due to access to raw materials, but also resistance among factory workers has also been suspected.

=== 1945–1960: Industrial locomotive ===
After the war, Kongsberg was designated as one of the major industrial builders in Norway. The company produced everyday necessities such as pots and pans, and contributed to the development of the defence and maritime industry.

The weapons factory was no longer under military command, and in 1953, the Norwegian Parliament, adopted a large-scale modernization and expansion of the company. The aim was to build a national high-tech defence industry that met the needs of the Norwegian Armed Forces as well as those of NATO.

The creation of the Forsvarets Forskningsinstitutt ("Defence Research Establishment") (FFI) at Kjeller in 1947 was part of the same strategy.

This cooperation was from the 1950s and up till present given rise to a number of defence systems such as the Penguin missile, NASAMS 2 air defence system, HUGIN AUV and Naval Strike Missile.

After an agreement with Volvo in 1957, the production of automobile parts also became a considerable business for KONGSBERG. At first the company produced drive shafts, and then other components for heavy trucks, buses, tractors and agricultural machinery. The division was later reorganized into the company Kongsberg Automotive.

=== 1960–1987: Innovative breakthrough ===
Having had a national focus in the post-war period, KONGSBERG again directed its attention and expertise towards the international market. The years from 1960 to the end of the 80s were a time of innovation, development and rapid growth for Kongsberg.

KONGSBERG's focus on the maritime industry began in the early 1970s and coincided with the discovery of oil in the North Sea. Companies that would later become part of Kongsberg Gruppen, such as Simrad and Norcontrol, however, had already provided sonar systems and equipment for fishing and merchant marine for decades.

The 1970s also became the decade when KONGSBERG positioned itself towards the petroleum sector. Dynamic positioning (DP) and subsea installations were revolutionary technology, which gave KONGSBERG a technological edge. KONGSBERG was about to get a position as a global technology leader.

=== 1960–1987: International breakthroughs ===
- The production of gas turbines in 1969
- Submarine systems in 1969-1970
- Subsea and dynamic positioning (DP) in the early 1970s
- Pioneering missile technology and the Penguin missiles in 1972

The rapid international growth resulted in both new opportunities and challenges. The new focus on establishing a civilian product portfolio changed the shape of the company. In 1981 civil divisions accounted for 70% of business.

Companies were acquired and the number of employees increased sharply. An international network of offices and factories began to take shape. But the business advancement and progress coincided with national and international unrest, which had a serious impact on the company, as an outcome of so-called Toshiba-Kongsberg scandal, after illegal export to the Soviet Union machine tools banned by Cocom. The outcome was a need to restructure the entire company.

=== 1987–1993: Reappearance ===
In 1987, the company was part of the Toshiba–Kongsberg scandal, which involved a subsidiary of Toshiba and the Kongsberg Vaapenfabrikk. The two provided the Soviet Union with technology (Toshiba milling machines and Kongsberg computer numerical controls) that could be used to produce quiet submarine propellers, in violation of the CoCom agreement. The US always relied on the fact that the Soviets had noisy boats. Providing the Soviet Union with technology that could make their subs harder to find and track was perceived as a significant threat to the security of the United States.

1987 was a turning point in the history of Kongsberg. The company was divided into divisions that manufactured automobile parts, aircraft parts, gas turbines, oil installations, and marine equipment and defence equipment. Innovation was high, but not the profitability. The company had taken on too large and complex development tasks.

The state, which owned all the shares, would not inject big money to keep the whole business, so the company was split up. The civil division was sold out, while the defence division continued under the name Norwegian Defence Technology (NFT) from 19 June 1987 to 1995.

The newly formed company had for a short period of time a renewed focus on its core defence business. This helped the company regain financial stability. Then Kongsberg again turned its focus towards civil and maritime sectors.

Kongsberg also entered new markets. In 1990 the company launched its own aerospace division.

The restructuring process that began in 1987 culminated in 1993 when it was decided that Kongsberg should be partially privatized and listed on the Oslo Stock Exchange. This gave Kongsberg greater independence and the opportunity to cooperate with private business investors. It helped facilitate many positive changes, such as the establishment of Kongsberg Maritime as a separate business unit. The decision proved to be a crucial building block in the creation of Kongsberg as a modern company.

=== 1993–2015: International growth ===
In 1993, the company Norwegian Defence Technology (NFT) became publicly listed and partially privatized. Two years later, in 1995, the company took the name Kongsberg Gruppen and the current logo was established.

Then followed a long series of acquisitions. This included buying back the maritime division.

The development of the prototype of HUGIN which was demonstrated for Statoil in 1996, later further developed to MUNIN. REMUS is another Autonomous Underwater Vehicle, produced at Hydroid, a fully owned subsidiary of Kongsberg.

In 1997, Kongsberg gathered its operations in the subsidiaries Kongsberg Maritime and Kongsberg Defence & Aerospace. As of 2026, Kongsberg Maritime is a standalone, separately listed company and no longer a part of Kongsberg Gruppen.

The development of the weapons station Protector RWS from 1997.

1998: the Air Defence System Norwegian Advanced Surface-to-Air Missile System (NASAMS) was pronounced operational.

In 2008, parts of the defence business spun off as a separate business area as "Kongsberg Protech Systems". Other defence activities continued under the name Kongsberg Defence Systems.

The co-development of Well Advisor together with BP

Also in 2008, parts of Kongsberg Maritime, which had worked with simulation technology in oil and gas, were reorganized under new management. The result was Kongsberg Oil & Gas Technologies that was established as a separate business area. However, due to challenging market conditions in the oil and gas industry this area was consolidated into Kongsberg Maritime and the newly established business area Kongsberg Digital in 2016.

By the end of 2009 Kongsberg was divided into four separate divisions/business areas.

The development of the Naval Strike Missile and the Joint Strike Missile.

In 2014, Kongsberg celebrated its 200th anniversary.

As of October 2017 the business area Kongsberg Protech Systems was merged into Kongsberg Defence & Aerospace.

== Business ==
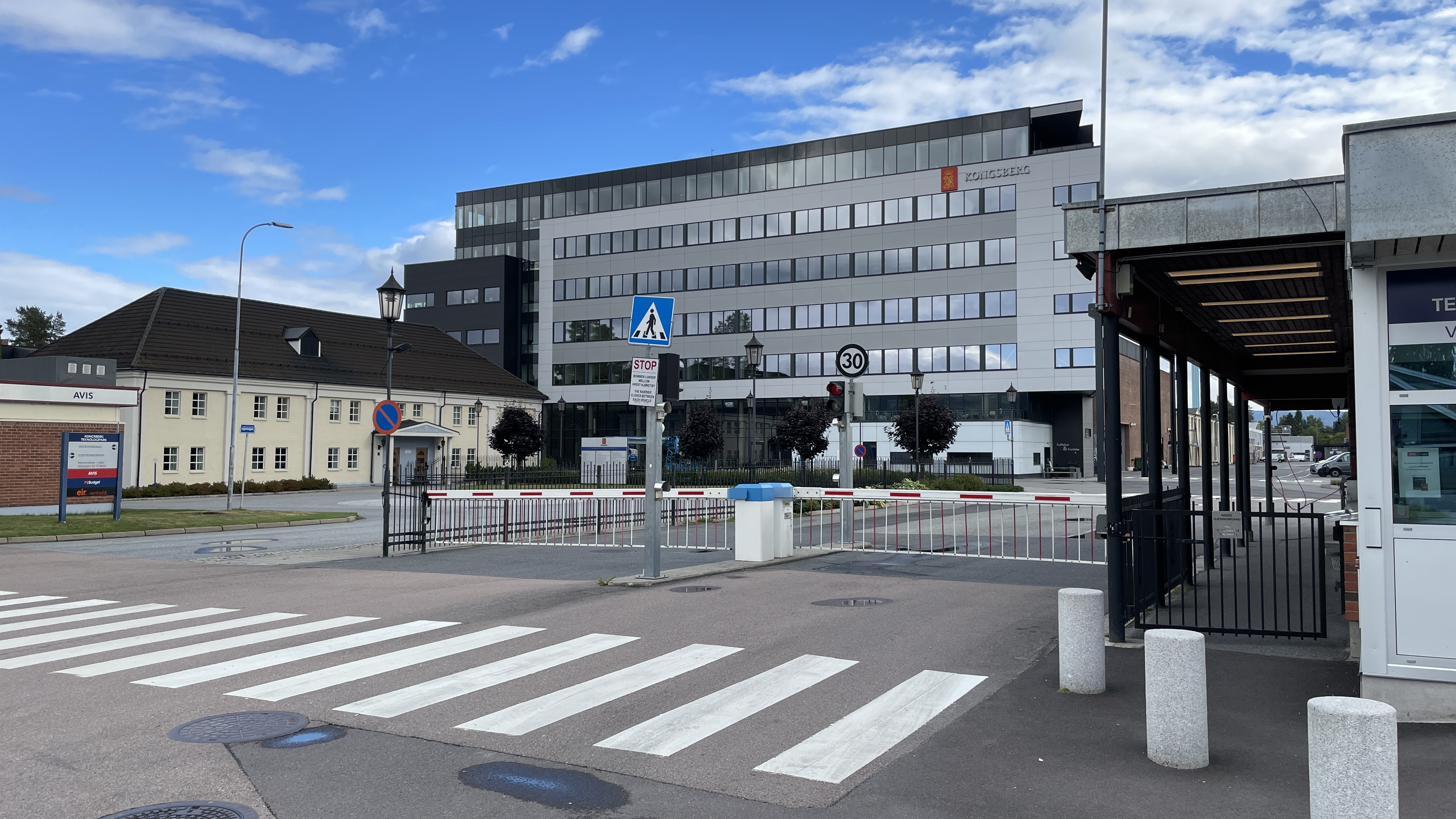
Kongsberg Gruppen entrance and conference building

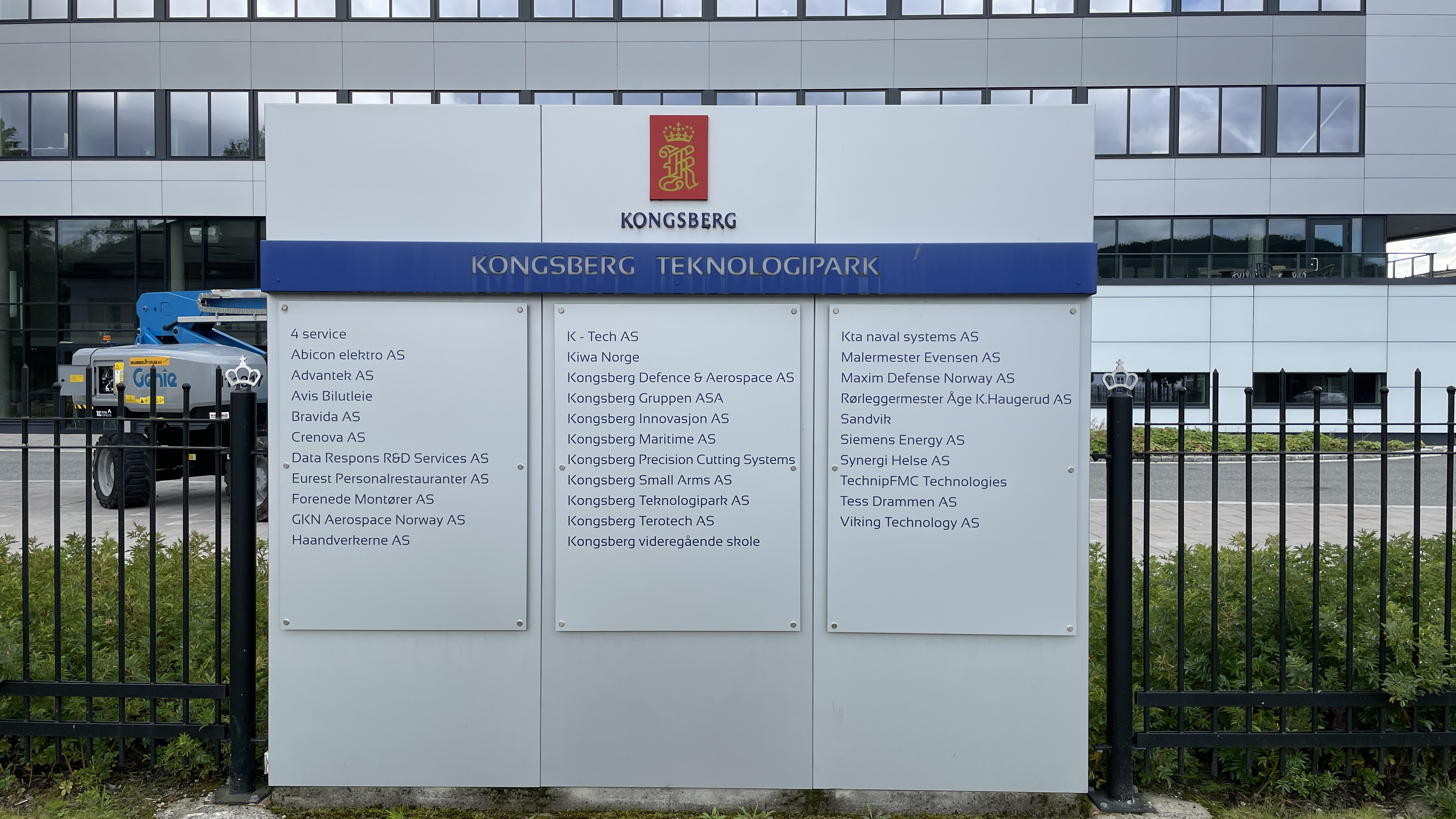
Kongsberg Gruppen Teknologipark members overview

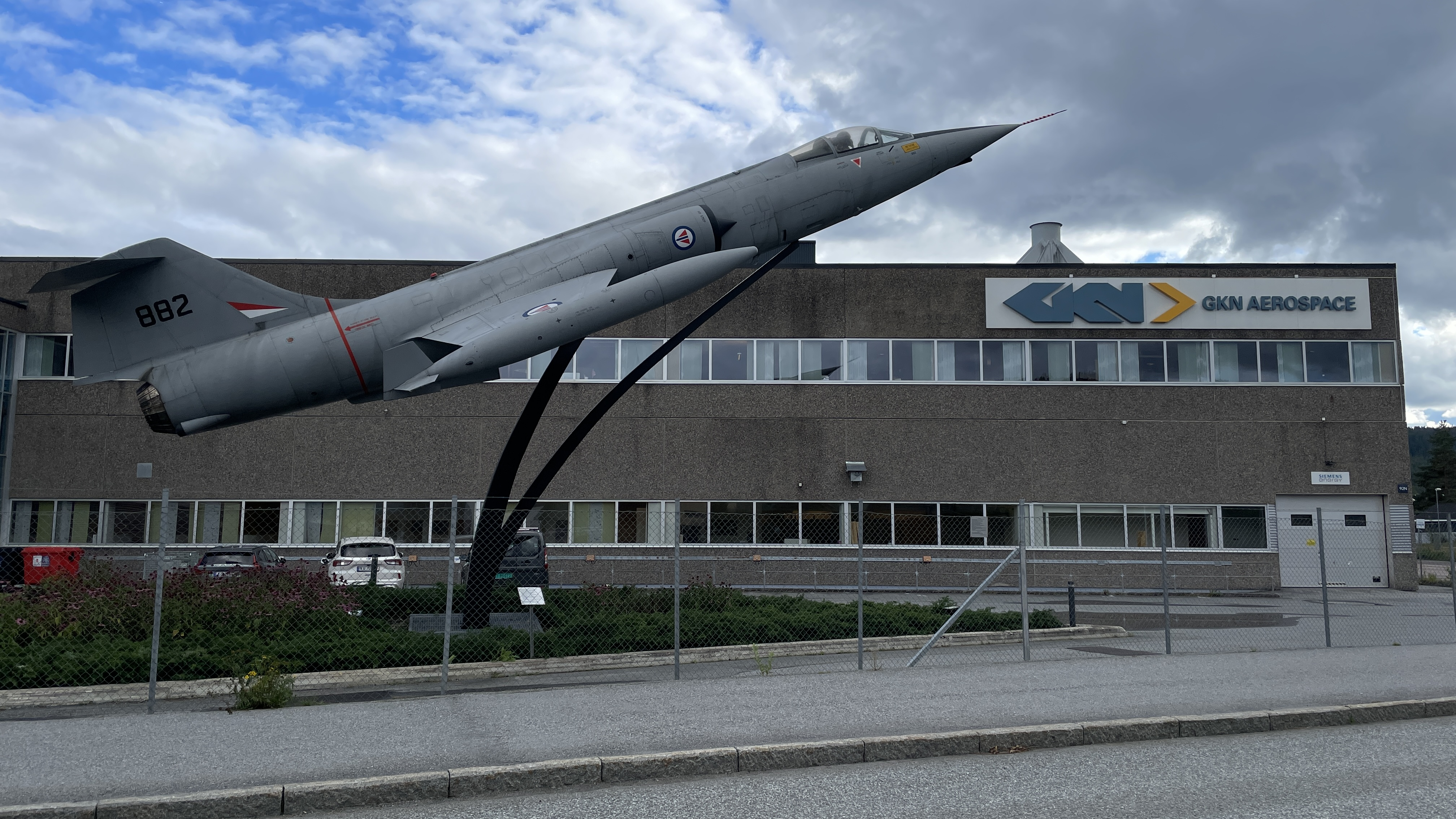
Kongsberg Gruppen Teknologipark Fighterjet model

The Kongsberg Group has three business areas: Kongsberg Discovery, Kongsberg Defence & Aerospace and Kongsberg Digital.

- Kongsberg Defence & Aerospace focuses on command and control systems, weapons control systems, communication systems, missiles, advanced composites and surveillance.
- Kongsberg Digital provides technology, products and services relating to monitoring, integration, analysis, simulation, quality assurance and governance for the oil and gas industry, maritime simulation and the renewables and utilities industry.

=== Defence ===
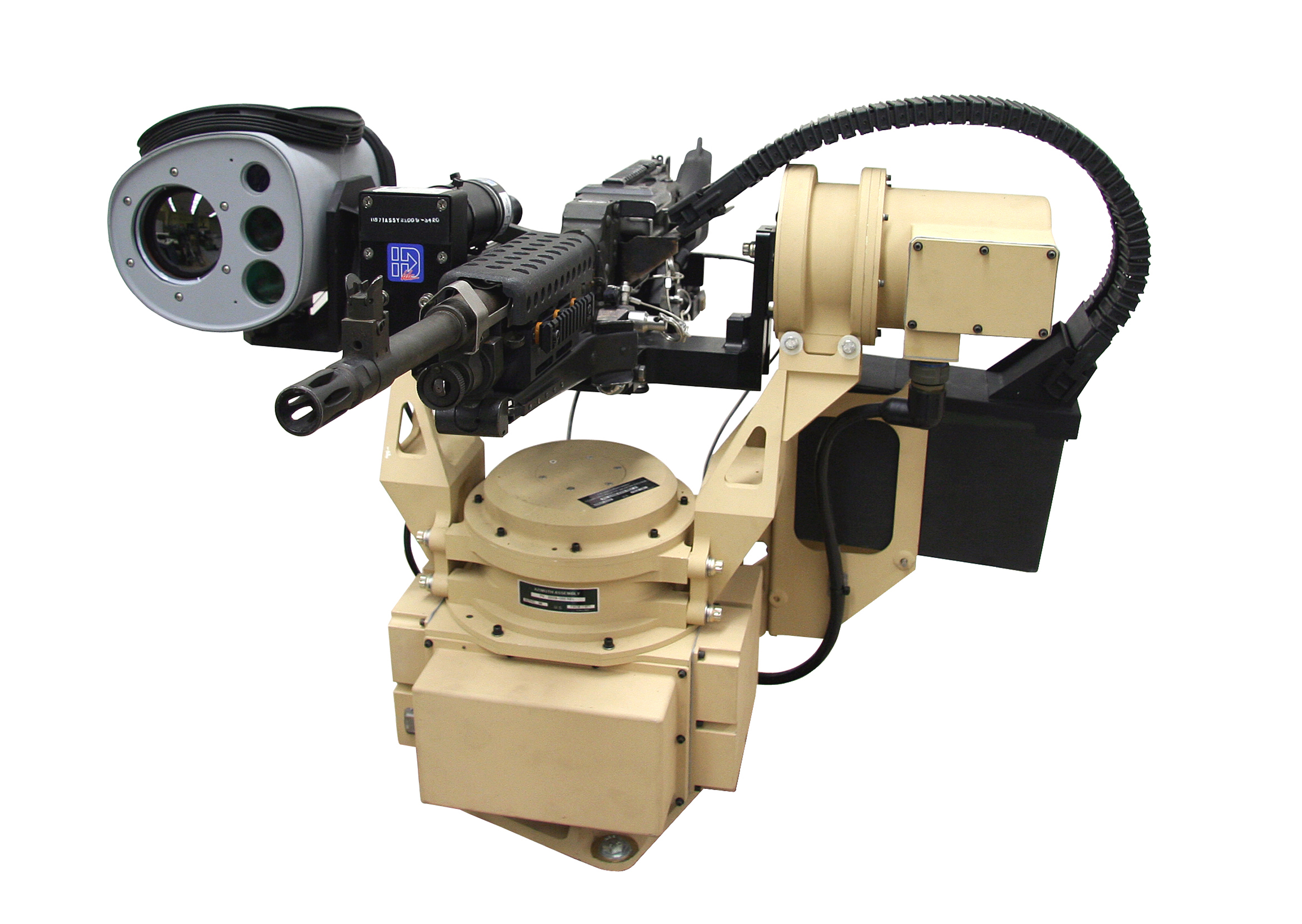
M240 machine gun mounted in the Common Remotely Operated Weapon System.

Kongsberg has a long history of collaborating with national and international defence industries.

The business area Kongsberg Defence & Aerospace is a provider of command and control systems, weapons control, communications, missiles, advanced composites and surveillance.

A major milestone for the Group's defence area came in 2007 when the Group won a contract worth eight billion kroner for the delivery of CROWS II – a type of Protector Remote Weapon Stations (RWS) - to the U.S. military.

The RWS allows the operator to control the weapon inside the vehicle, providing increased protection and reduced risk of both military personnel and civilians. As of today, the Protector RWS claims to be the world's leading provider of remote weapon stations. Kongsberg has since delivered more than 17,000 weapons systems to 16 countries worldwide.

Kongsberg's largest single contract ever was signed in January 2014 with Oman on the air defence system NASAMS.

In September 2019, Kongsberg unveiled the Vanguard-class multirole warship, designed in collaboration with Salt Ships.

==== Notable defence area products ====
- Penguin
- Naval Strike Missile (NSM)
- Joint Strike Missile (JSM)
- NASAMS 2
- Protector Remote Weapon Station (RWS) - with Thales
- CROWS II – variant of Protector system
- Vanguard-class multirole warship
- Super Sonic Strike Missile (3SM) Tyrfing (3SM)

=== Space ===
Kongsberg has for several years increased its activities in space and surveillance. KONGSBERG's space activities are organized under Kongsberg Defence Systems.

In 1990, Kongsberg launched its own aerospace business unit. Through its subsidiaries Kongsberg Satellite Services (KSAT) and Kongsberg Spacetec in Tromsø the company is now a leader in services related to ground stations and satellites. Kongsberg currently operates a worldwide network of ground stations including on Svalbard and Antarctica, used by e.g. NASA and the European Space Agency (ESA). The acquisition of Horten-based Norspace AS 2011 consolidated space operations in Norway and contributed to KONGSBERG's commercial position within international aerospace and surveillance was strengthened.

Kongsberg's space division is Norway's largest supplier of equipment and services to the European Space Agency (ESA).

Kongsberg's Space & Surveillance division delivers a broad spectrum of equipment; systems and services related to space and maritime surveillance customers in more than 40 countries. The portfolio includes equipment and components for the European heavy-lift launcher Ariane 5, communication satellites, earth observation satellites and scientific space probes. The division is a supplier of satellite ground stations for downloading and processing satellite data, as well as a supplier of satellite services from ground stations at Svalbard in the Arctic, the Antarctic and numerous other locations.

The division is also a provider of maritime domain awareness systems and control centers for maritime surveillance, where integration of terrestrial and satellite data constitutes an important component.

Kongsberg's Space & Surveillance division is located in Kongsberg, Kjeller, Horten and Tromsø.

=== Digital ===
Kongsberg Digital was established in 2016 to increase to group's focus and efforts on industrial digitalization. It was fully operational from 1 July 2016. The business area consists of simulation from the previous business area of Kongsberg Oil & Gas Technologies and simulation from Kongsberg Maritime. In addition the business area has established positions within the renewable and utilities area. The business area is headquartered in Asker, with offices throughout Norway and the world.

==== Notable Kongsberg Digital products ====
- EmPower
- K-Sim
- K-Spice
- Kognifai
- LedaFlow
- Rig Manager
- SiteCom
- Kognitwin

== Corporate management ==
=== Kongsberg's executives ===
- Poul Steenstrup, Manager 1814–1824
- Captain Fredrik Meyn, Manager/Vice President 1824–1842
- Staff Captain Peder Christian Holst, Vice President 1842–1854
- Captain Jens Landmark, Vice President 1854–1880 (constituted 1854–1855)
- Captain Ole Herman Johannes Krag, Vice President 1880–1895
- Captain Jacob Maximillian Gran Paaske, Vice President 1895–1912
- Captain Johan Jørgen Schwartz, Vice President 1912–1926
- Captain Haakon Finne, Vice President 1926–1940
- Department engineer Thomas Mørk, Temporary Manager 1940–1945
- Captain Haakon Finne, 1945–1946
- Major Alstad, acting Vice President 1945–1948
- Dr. scient. Leif Lyche, Vice President 1948–1956
- Major Bjarne Hurlen, Chief Executive Officer (CEO) 1956–1975
- Arthur J. Aasland, 1975-1978
- Rolf Qvenild, Chief Executive Officer (CEO) 1978–1987
- Tor Espedal, 1987
- Jens Charles Width, 1987–1988
- Jan T Jørgensen, Chief Executive Officer (CEO) 1987–1999
- Jan Erik Korssjøen, Chief Executive Officer (CEO) 1999–2008
- Walter Qvam, Chief Executive Officer (CEO) 2008–2016
- Geir Håøy, Chief Executive Officer (CEO) 2016–

== Results ==
	2018	2017	2016	2015	2014	2013	2012	2011	2010	2009
Revenues	14,381	14,490	15,845	17,032	16,603	16,323	15,652	15,128	15,497	13,816
Earnings before interest, taxes, depreciation and amortisation (EBITDA)	1,394	1,279	1,217	1,784	2,060	2,142	2,294	2,385	2,485	1,619
Earnings before taxes (EBT)	844	654	729	944	1,285	1,644	1,809	1,991	2,097	1,169

Figures are in millions. Currency missing?

== Controversies ==
=== Corruption charges ===
In 2014 the company and Kongsberg Defence Systems were charged by Norway, for corruption related to deliveries (worth around Norwegian kroner 1.5 billion) of communication equipment to Romania during 1999–2008. The alleged corruption supposedly occurred in Kongsberg Defence & Aerospace, according to Aftenposten.

In spring 2012 "various signals" indicated corrupt practices, and within a short time, investigators from outside the company were put to task. In autumn of 2013 the company discontinued a year-long investigation by PricewaterhouseCoopers—without giving the investigators' report to the police. The investigation found that funds had been transferred to tax havens.

On 25 February 2014 Økokrim searched company premises in Kongsberg and Asker. On the same day one employee was arrested and charged (and released two days later). The leaders of the company were summoned for a meeting with then Minister of Trade and Industry. On 26 February 2014 the meeting was held, attended by then chairman and then CEO. The board meeting later that day, was joined by the minister via phone.

On 27 February 2014 media said that then chairman had not read the report by PricewaterhouseCoopers about their investigation.

A 28 February 2014 NRK article said that the transaction with Romania was connected with export guarantees worth Norwegian kroner 669 million—from Guarantee Institute for Export Credits (GIEK). Furthermore, "while we [NRK] were at the National Archives to find the documents, representatives from GIEK came to get the folders, supposedly because Økokrim has requested delivery of the documents—from GIEK". (The folders contained "three of the contracts" [with Romania].) The contracts with GIEK stipulate that bribes and other corruption are in violation of the contracts.

Reactions to the investigation include professor Peter Gottschalk saying that "It is obvious that the company should have contacted the police and not discontinued the case. When financial crime is suspected, the police should be notified. I think that the reason they did not do that, was that they did not want publicity". A 28 February 2014 Dagens Næringsliv article said that "The question for the company's largest owner thru minister of trade Monica Mæland (H)—without regard to what Økokrim uncovers in its investigation—ought to be whether the government's companies are best served by having committee members that are that irresolute". A 5 March 2014 Aftenposten editorial said that "The most important question is another one: Why do such cases appear again and again, despite tightened regulations and attitude campaigns? - Is it time to move focus to the manner in which co-workers are rewarded?" An 18 March Dagens Næringsliv editorial said that "The board of directors of Kongsberg Gruppen permitted the [corporation's] leadership to put out of sight—the fact finding report regarding possible corruption—without bothering the leadership with bothersome questions. - The minister of trade must evaluate if this is in line with the zero tolerance, that she is trying to 'make more clear'."

In August 2016 the case against KONSGBERG was dropped by Økokrim, thus the company no longer being under suspicion or investigation for corruption. Økokrim decided to prosecute a former employee of the company with charges of fraud.

=== Cultural sponsoring ===
The Kongsberg Group is a main sponsors of the Kongsberg Jazz Festival. In 2018 Andreas Røysum started an online petition on iPetitions demanding the festival organizers to end their cooperation with the Kongsberg Group stating the sponsoring being incompatible with the spirit of the festival.

=== Israel and Gaza ===
Kongsberg gruppen has been accused of complicity in supplying Israel in the Gaza War with parts for the F-35 used by Israeli Defence Forces.

Kongsberg gruppen is also accused of indirectly selling munitions to Israel through the Norwegian-Finnish company Nammo in which it holds shares. Nammo defends itself by saying it is not responsible for the onselling of its munitions once it has sold them.

== See also ==
- Kongsberg Mesotech
- Kongsberg Colt
- List of oldest companies
- M1 Abrams TUSK Kit (M1 Abrams tank with Kongsberg Gruppen remote-control MG turret)
