= Ferdinand Carl Maria Wedel-Jarlsberg =

Norwegian military officer and commanding general

Ferdinand Wedel-Jarlsberg
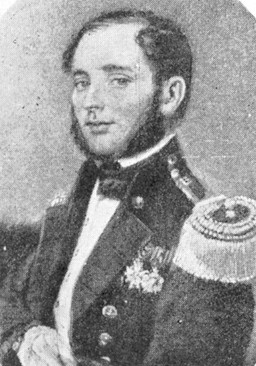
- Born: 1 December 1781; Naples, Kingdom of Naples
- Died: 16 April 1857 (aged 75)
- Military career
- Allegiance: Denmark–Norway; Norway
- Branch: Royal Danish Army; Norwegian Army
- Service years: 1790–1850
- Rank: Lieutenant general
- Commands: Norwegian Army
- Conflicts: Napoleonic Wars; Battle of Copenhagen (1807)
- Awards: Order of St. Olav

Ferdinand Carl Maria Wedel-Jarlsberg (1 December 1781 – 16 April 1857) was a Norwegian military officer and commanding general of the Royal Norwegian Army.

== Biography ==
He was the son of Frederik Anton Wedel Jarlsberg (1748–1811) and Catharina Storm (1756–1802). He was born in Naples, Italy where his father served as Danish-Norwegian diplomat. His elder brother, Herman Wedel Jarlsberg (1779–1840), was a statesman and member of the Norwegian Parliament.

In 1790, he entered the Royal Danish Army. In 1807, he participated against the Royal British Navy during the Battle of Copenhagen. After resignation from the Danish Army he was appointed in November 1814 as a major in the Norwegian cavalry. Wedel-Jarlsberg was a commander of Akershus Fortress from 1819. In 1823 he became a Major General and head of the cavalry. In 1833 he became General Lieutenant and was commander of the Royal Norwegian Army from 1836–50.

He was awarded membership in the Order of St. Olav in 1847, and won the Borgerdådsmedal in gold in 1850.
