= Stortorvet =

Square in Oslo, Norway

Stortorvets Gjæstgiveri
- Norwegian Cultural Heritage Site
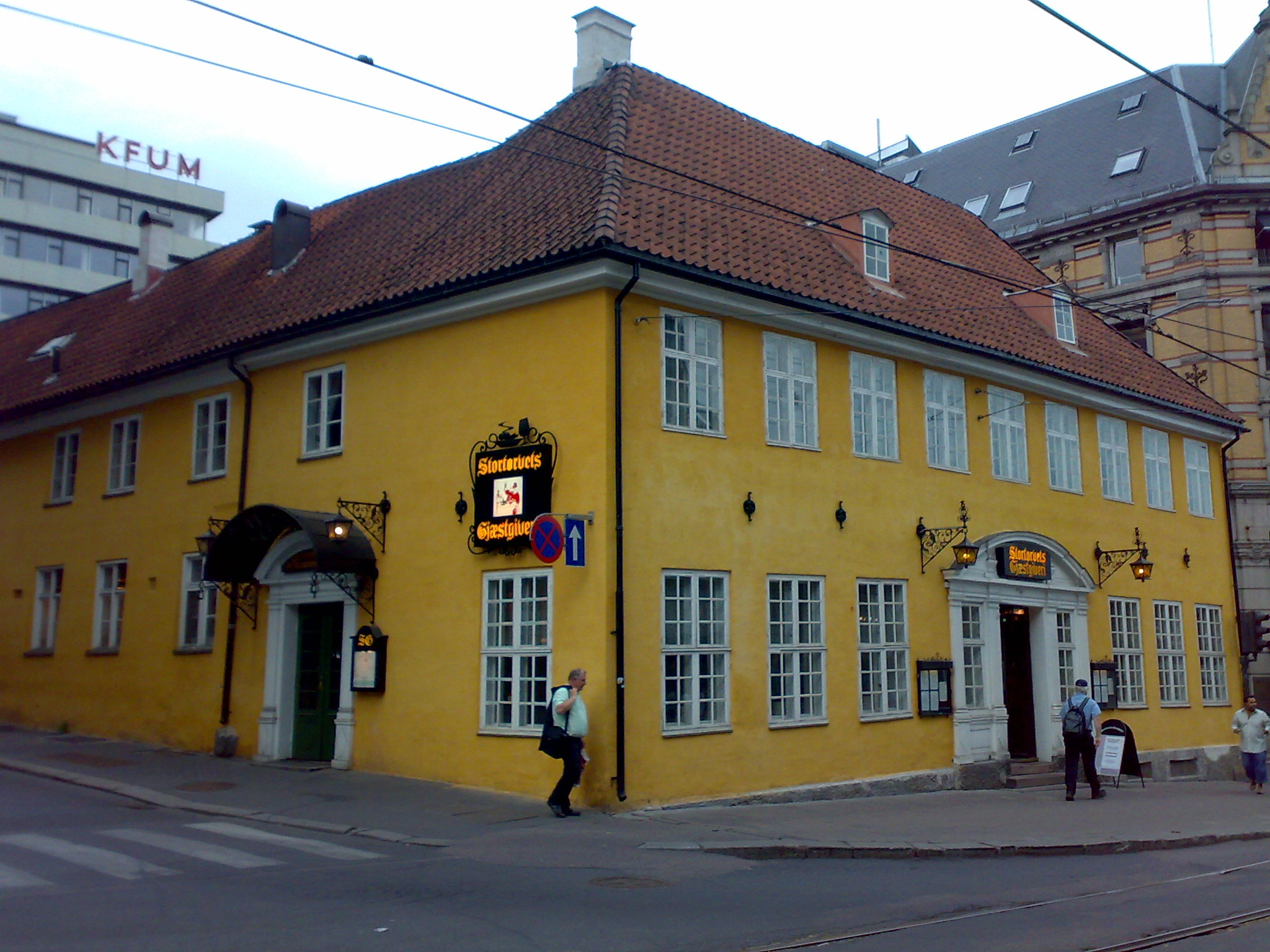
- Stortorvets Gjæstgiveri
- Type: Townhouse
- Status: Protected by resolution
- County: Oslo
- Municipality: Oslo
- Coordinates: 59°54′48.21″N 10°44′40.88″E
- Year built: 18th century
- ID: 86005

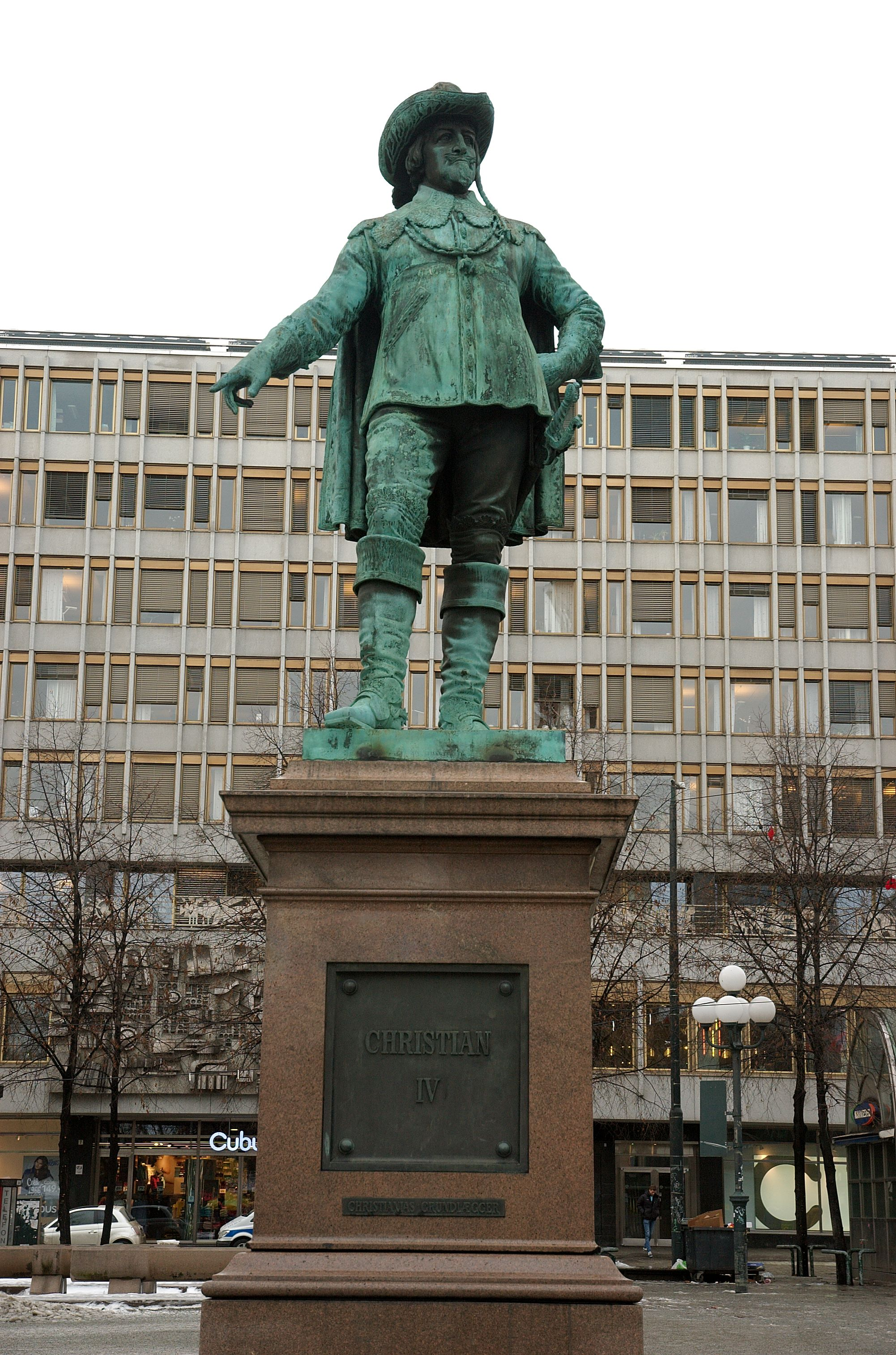
The statue of king Christian IV at Stortorvet.

Stortorvet ('The Grand Plaza') is a square in Oslo, Norway, located west of Oslo Cathedral.

== Background ==
It was officially inaugurated during the autarchic times, in 1736. A town market was held here until 1889. Marketing still exists, but has largely been moved to Youngstorget. The building that houses the restaurant Stortorvets Gjæstgiveri is a Norwegian Cultural Heritage Site. Other buildings surrounding the square are business buildings such as GlasMagasinet and the main entrance of the Oslo Cathedral.

Stortorvet was located on the outskirts of the part of the capital that was founded by King Christian IV, Christiania. A bronze statue of the king pointing is located in the square, entitled "here the city is to be".

The square became an important hub for public transportation with the introduction of the tramway. A balloon loop for the Ekeberg Line was located here until the 1960s. Stortorvet is still served by a station on the Oslo Tramway—Stortorvet—as well as buses.

The so-called Battle of the Square took place here in 1829.

== Gallery ==
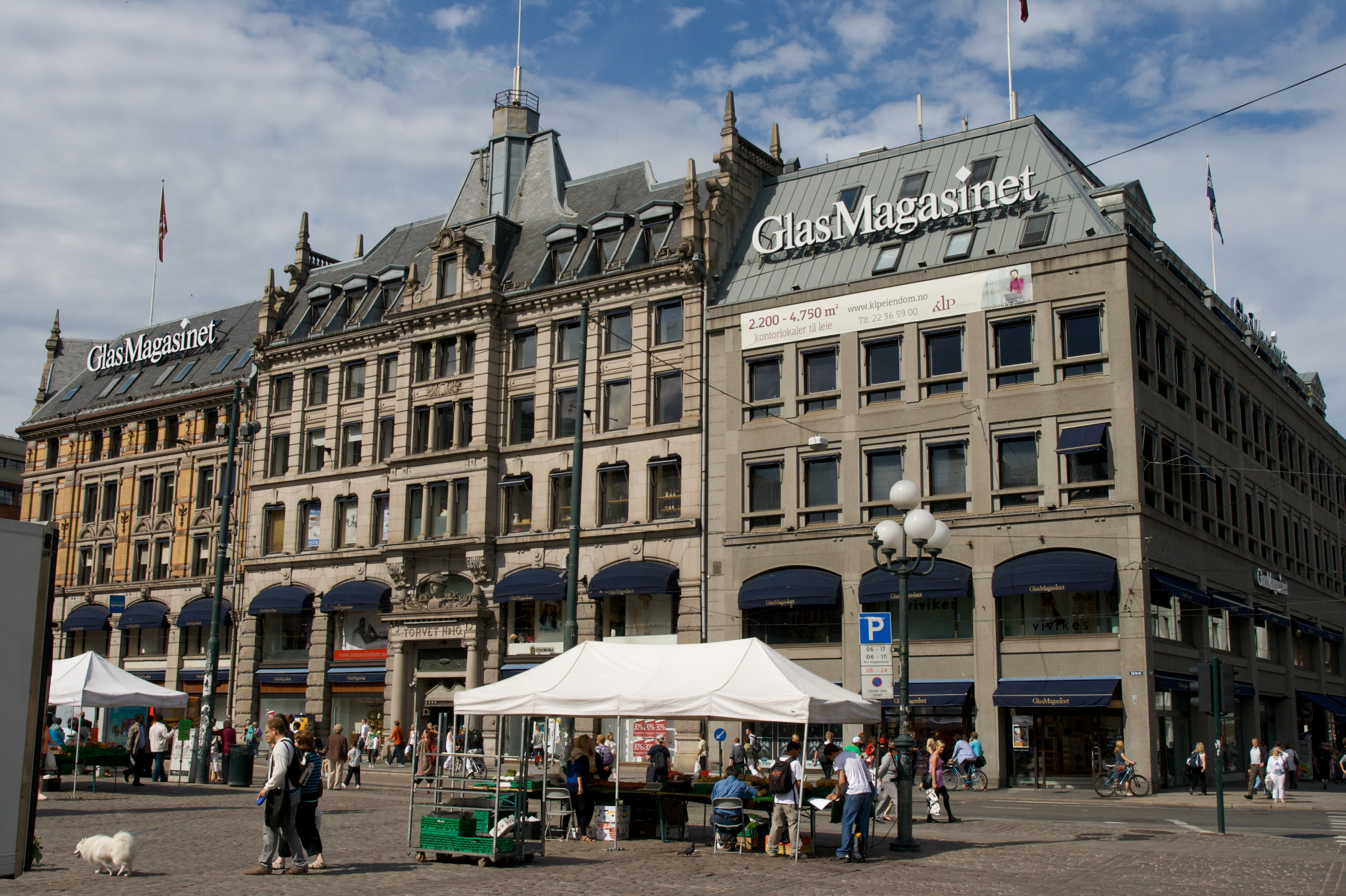
GlasMagasinet

Historical gallery

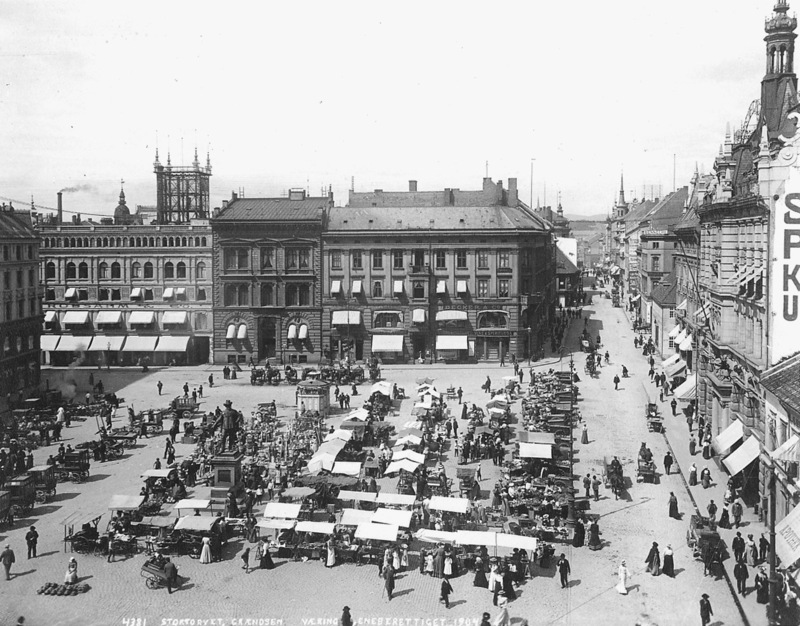
Stortorvet in 1904

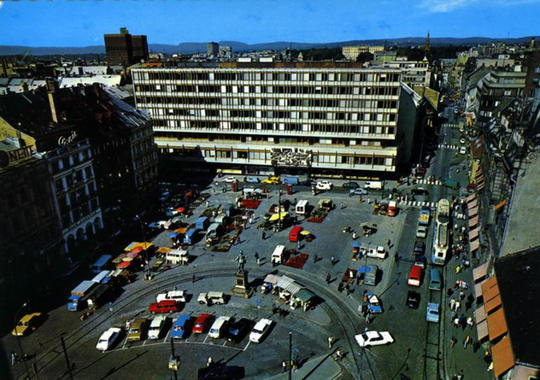
Stortorvet in the 1970s

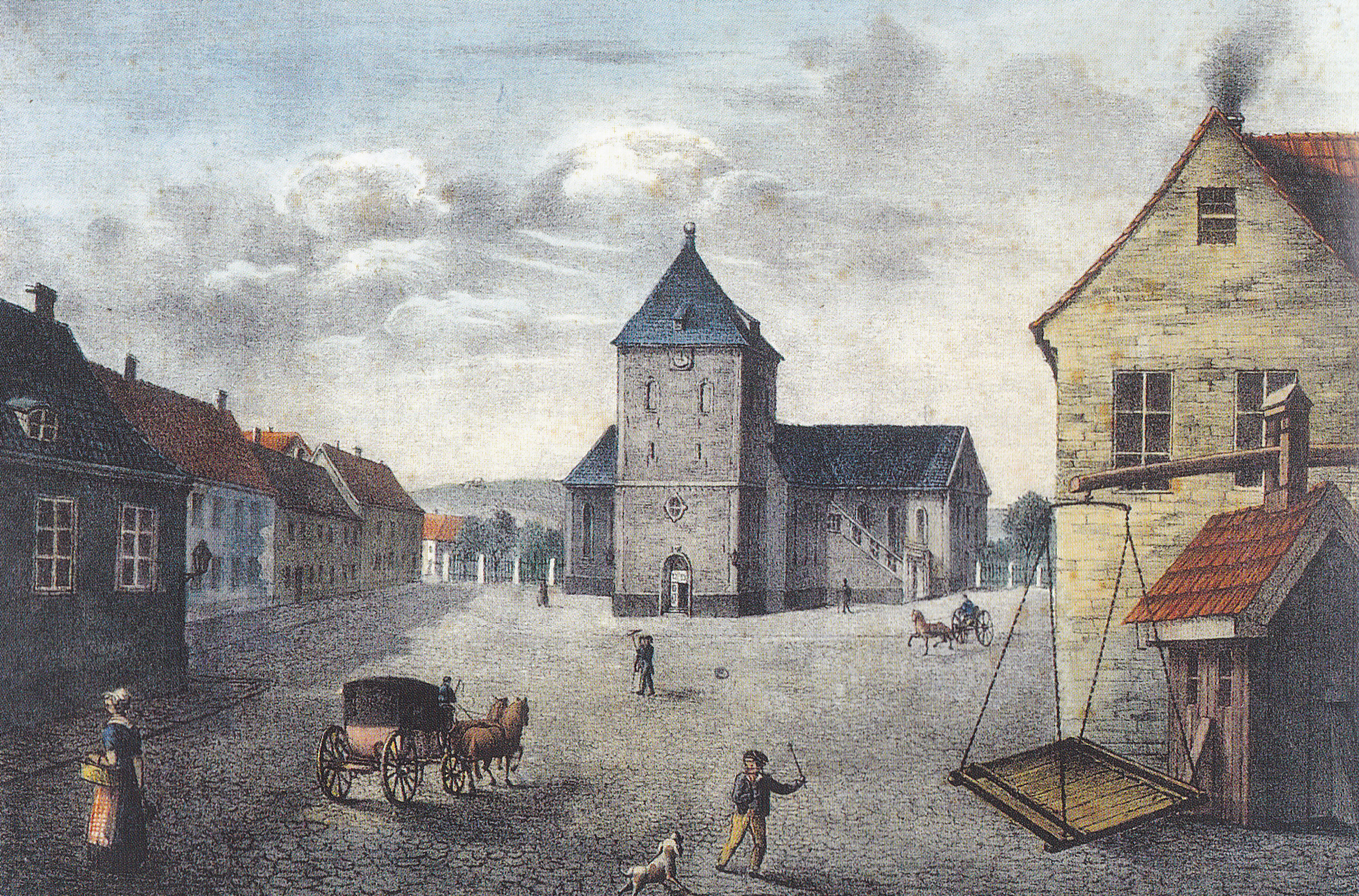
Stortorvet and the cathedral in 1830
^{Painting by Peter Frederik Wergmann}

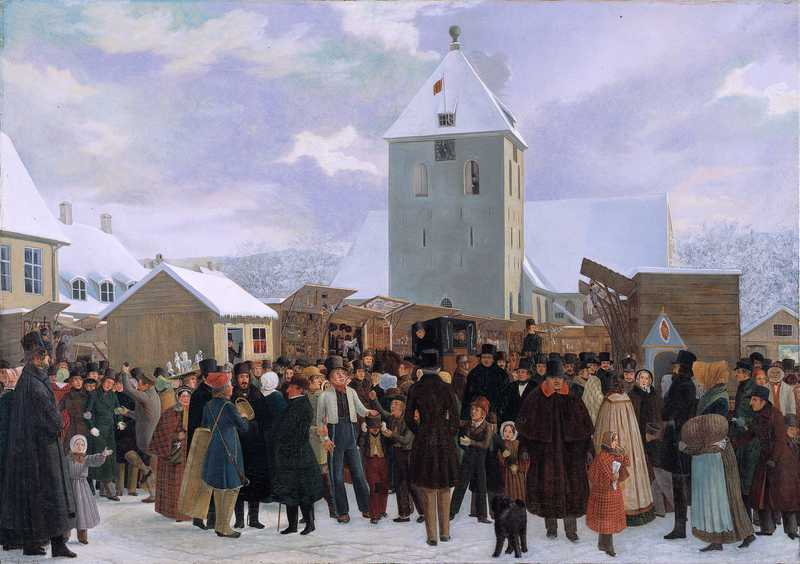
Market at Stortorvet in 1843
^{Painting by L.W.Th. Bratz}
