= Jarmann harpoon rifle =

Jarmann M28 harpoon gun
- Type: bolt action harpoon gun
- Place of origin: Norway

Service history
- In service: 1928 onwards

Production history
- Designer: Jacob Smith Jarmann
- Designed: 1928
- No. built: 1,911
- Variants: M28

Specifications
- Mass: 5.3 kg (12 lb) empty, 7.7 kg (17 lb) with harpoon
- Length: 1.06 m (42 in)
- Barrel length: Unknown
- Cartridge: 10.15 x 61R rimmed
- Action: Bolt action
- Rate of fire: Unknown, but as fast as the operator could reload
- Muzzle velocity: Unknown
- Effective firing range: 300 m (330 yd)
- Feed system: 1
- Sights: V-notch and front post

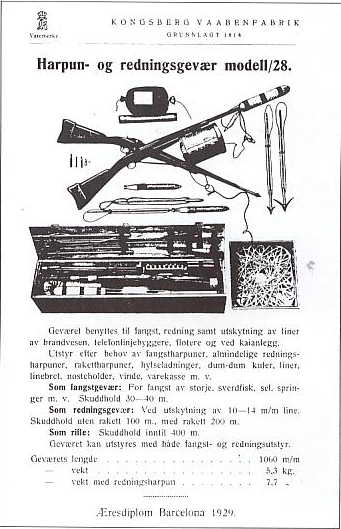
A 1930 advertisement for the M28

The M28 Jarmann harpoon rifle was a modification of the Jarmann M1884 Norwegian service rifle.

Between the wars, several Norwegian gunsmiths attempted to create harpoon guns, intended for hunting seals and shooting rescue lines to boats in distress. Seeing a ready market, and having access to the several thousand Jarmanns in storage, Kongsberg Våpenfabrikk designed a harpoon gun referred to as the M28. As part of the rebuild, the magazine and the repeating mechanism were removed, and the handguard and barrel were shortened. In addition, a heavy rubber shoulderpad was added to reduce the considerable recoil. The rifle could still fire the ordinary 10.15 x 61R cartridge after the conversion. A box could be mounted under the handguard containing up to 300 metres (980 feet) of thin rope. Kongsberg manufactured the M28 harpoon gun until 1952, when they started using the Mauser 98 mechanism in a new harpoon gun called the M52. The sources indicate that around 1,911 Jarmann rifles were modified to M28s, about half of them after World War II.

The M28 was advertised as being suitable for use for hunting and rescue work, as well as for general shooting of lines. The advertisement reproduced here specifically mentions its suitability for firefighters, people erecting telephone lines and general construction work. The M28 was seen as suitable for hunting Atlantic bluefin tuna, seals, swordfish and other large marine animals. Among the equipment that could be delivered for the M28 were hunting harpoons, rescue harpoons, rocket-assisted harpoons, 'dum-dum bullets' and rope of various lengths in special crates. The special rounds for launching harpoons were manufactured until the mid-1970s.

== See also ==
- Krag–Jørgensen harpoon rifle
