= Kraus (disambiguation) =

Kraus is a surname of German origin. It may also refer to:

- Kraus (New Zealand musician), New Zealand experimental musician and composer also known as Pat Kraus (fl. 1998–present)
- Kraus (shoegaze musician), American musician Will Kraus (born 1994 or 1995)
- Kraus Flooring, a Canadian manufacturer
- 27049 Kraus, a main-belt asteroid
- Kraus-type radio telescope
- Kraus, a Delta Faucet Company brand of plumbing fixtures

== See also ==
- Kraus House, Kirkwood, Missouri, United States, designed by Frank Lloyd Wright, on the National Register of Historic Places
- Kraus Corset Factory, Derby, Connecticut, United States, on the National Register of Historic Places
- Crause, a German weapons manufacturer in the first half of the 19th century
