= 8×58mmR Danish Krag =

Rifle cartridge

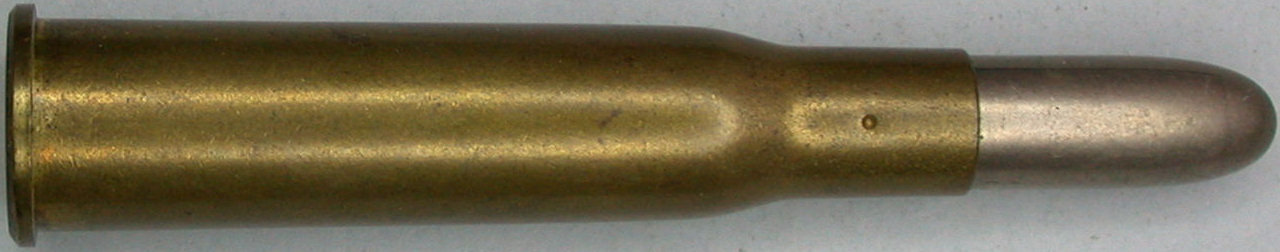
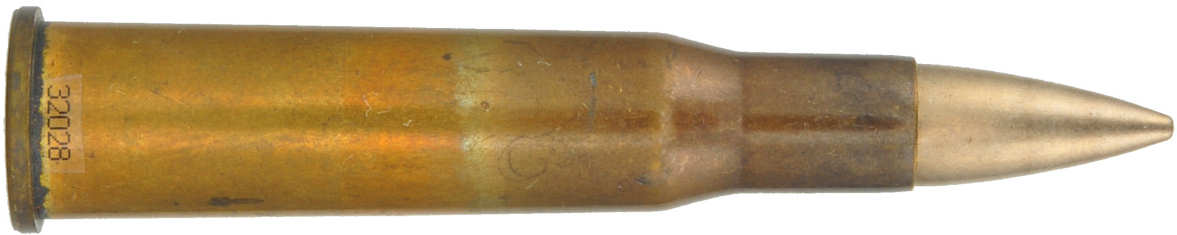
- Danish M1889 round-nosed and M1908 spitzer service ammunition
- Type: Rifle
- Place of origin: Denmark

Service history
- In service: 1889–1945
- Used by: Denmark; Norway; Sweden
- Wars: World War II

Production history
- Designed: 1888
- Manufacturer: Norma Precision

Specifications
- Case type: Rimmed, bottleneck
- Bullet diameter: 8.20 mm (0.323 in)
- Land diameter: 7.89 mm (0.311 in)
- Neck diameter: 8,98
- Shoulder diameter: 11.95 mm (0.470 in)
- Base diameter: 12.75 mm (0.502 in)
- Rim diameter: 14.65 mm (0.577 in)
- Rim thickness: 1.80 mm (0.071 in)
- Case length: 58.00 mm (2.283 in)
- Overall length: 78.00 mm (3.071 in)
- Case capacity: 4.55 cm^{3} (70.2 gr H_{2}O)
- Rifling twist: 1:11.811 in (300 mm)
- Maximum pressure: 180.00–306.00 MPa (26,107–44,382 psi)

Ballistic performance
Bullet mass/type	Velocity	Energy
237 gr (15 g) Round Nose	2,460 ft/s (750 m/s)	3,185 ft⋅lbf (4,318 J)
196 gr (13 g) Spitzer	2,530 ft/s (770 m/s)	2,786 ft⋅lbf (3,777 J)

The 8×58mmR Danish Krag, also known as the 8×58mmRD, is a late 19th-century rimmed centerfire military rifle cartridge similar to other early smokeless powder designs. It was briefly adopted by Norway and Sweden and remained the standard Danish service rifle cartridge from 1889 until 1945.

== Cartridge dimensions ==
The 8×58mmR Danish Krag has 4.55 ml (70.2 grains H_{2}O) of cartridge case capacity.

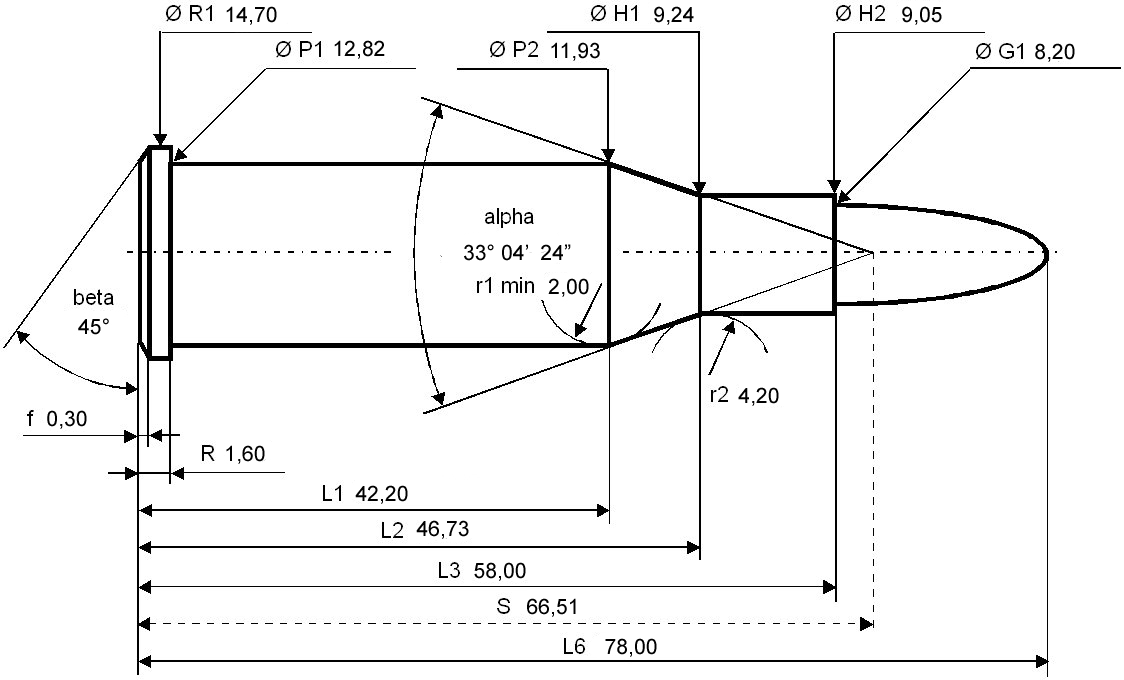

8×58mmR Danish Krag cartridge dimensions. All sizes in millimeters (mm). The dimensions of this drawing come from the ammunition manufacturer RWS and differ somewhat between various sources.

Americans define the shoulder angle at alpha/2 ≈ 16.5 degrees. Ø lands = 7.89 mm (0.311 in), Ø grooves = 8.20 mm (0.323 in).

There are no official C.I.P. (Commission Internationale Permanente pour l'Epreuve des Armes à Feu Portatives) rulings for this cartridge (2017). Varying sources quote the 8×58mmR Danish Krag can handle from 180.00 MPa (26,107 psi) up to 306.00 MPa (44,382 psi) P_{max} piezo pressure. This P_{max} level range is extreme, so loading up to a high P_{max} level can be dangerous in historic arms.

A dangerous error can occur when confusion occurs between the 8×58mmR Danish Krag and the 8×58mmR. The latter being an old German differing chambering.

== Military history ==
The cartridge was developed in Denmark in 1888 by necking-down Danish 11,4x51R Remington Rolling Block cartridge using round-nosed bullets with 4 grams (62 gr) of gunpowder, and adopted the following year by Denmark in the Krag–Jørgensen M89 rifle. Sweden implemented a major arsenal rebuilding of their M1867 rifles for the 8×58mmR, and Norway experimentally compared 8×58mmR Remington rolling block conversions to the Jarmann M1884. Its service in Sweden was very brief, though, since the 6.5×55mm was developed by Sweden and Norway in 1891, formally approved in 1893, and entered service in the Norwegian Krag–Jørgensen rifle in 1894, and in the Swedish Mauser carbine in 1894 and rifle in 1896. Denmark modernized military loading of the 8×58mmR in 1908 using smokeless powder with spitzer bullets; and Danish troops were still armed with the 8×58mmR when Germany invaded in 1940.

== Sporting use ==
Surplus military rifles have been used for hunting; and ammunition was manufactured in Otterup and by Norma Precision after World War II. Documentation is scarce for the design pressure specifications of these surplus firearms. Although modern weapons may have been designed for smokeless powder loadings, their similarity to arms designed for gunpowder loadings causes uncertainty about the safety of firing modern cartridges in weapons lacking proof test documentation.

== See also ==
- List of rimmed cartridges
- Table of handgun and rifle cartridges
