= Krag–Petersson =

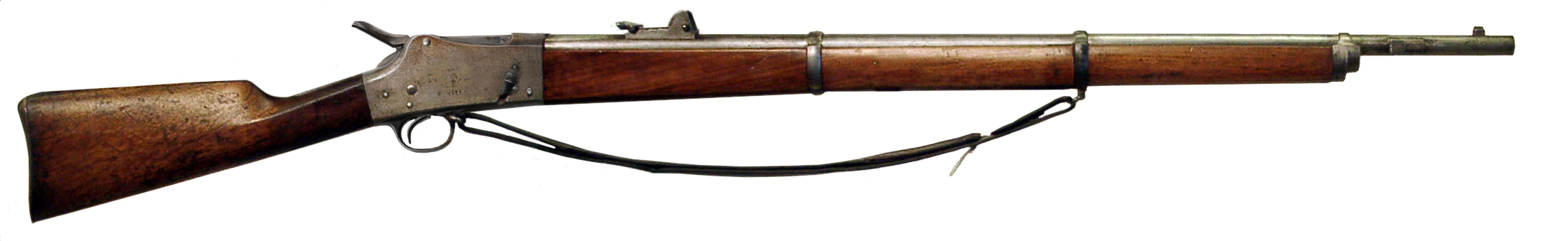
- The Krag–Petersson rifle
- Type: Falling-block repeating rifle
- Place of origin: Norway

Service history
- In service: 1876 to 1900

Production history
- Designer: O.H.J. Krag and A. Petersson
- Designed: 1872
- No. built: 17 prototypes and preproduction models 30 rifles for Norwegian trials 975 production rifles 115 rifles for Danish trials
- Variants: prototypes, production rifles

Specifications
- Mass: Unknown
- Length: Unknown
- Barrel length: 951 mm (37.4 in)
- Cartridge: 12.17 × 44 mm rimfire
- Action: Falling block
- Rate of fire: 19 shots a minute when used as a single loader 11 shots in 25 seconds when used with magazine
- Muzzle velocity: 381 m/s (1,250 ft/s)
- Effective firing range: 900 m (3,000 ft)
- Feed system: 10-round tubular magazine
- Sights: V-notch and front post

The Krag–Petersson was the first repeating rifle adopted by the armed forces of Norway and was one of the first repeating rifles to be adopted as standard issue by a military force, being preceded by the Swiss Vetterli adopted in 1867. Developed by Ole Herman Johannes Krag, the action of the Krag–Petersson was uniquely actuated by an oversized hammer. Another distinguishing feature was that the cartridge rising from the magazine was not seated automatically, but had to be pushed into the breech of the rifle.

Testing by the Norwegian military revealed the Krag–Petersson was a robust, accurate and quick-firing weapon, and the Royal Norwegian Navy adopted the rifle in 1876. The rifle was extensively tested by other nations, but none adopted it. After being phased out around 1900, the remaining rifles were sold to civilians and often were extensively rebuilt. Today, it is so difficult to find one in original condition that the Krag–Petersson has been described as "the rifle everybody has heard about, but hardly anybody has ever seen". It was the first rifle designed by Ole H. J. Krag to be adopted by an armed force.

== Design and development ==
The mechanism was developed by Ole Herman Johannes Krag, with vital help from his friend Axel Petersson on the actuation of the mechanism. Ole H. J. Krag had been experimenting with repeating rifles for several years before he designed the Krag–Petersson rifle. His earlier models were actuated by a side-mounted lever working an interior crankshaft. Moving the lever in a half circle, counter-clockwise, made the breechblock – the part of the mechanism that seals the rear of the barrel – move back and down. The rearward movement of the breechblock automatically ejected the spent round and the downward movement allowed the magazine follower to push a new round into the breech. In 1871, Axel Petersson suggested changing the design to allow the hammer to operate the breechblock instead, thus making the mechanism both simpler and easier to operate. The Krag–Petersson, like Krag's previous design, featured a tubular magazine under the barrel.

The action of the Krag–Petersson fieldstripped (refer to the text)

The action of the Krag–Petersson is, as seen in the photograph to the left, simple compared to modern rifles. It consists of eight components: the receiver (A), the hammer (B), the tilting breechblock (C), the firing pin (D), two pins to secure the hammer and breechblock (E and F), a lockplate with a screw to secure the pins (G) and the tubular magazine (not shown in the photograph).

The Krag–Petersson repeating rifle has a falling block action, i.e. the breechblock moves downwards as the mechanism is opened, actuated (operated) by the operation of the exterior hammer. The tubular magazine, containing a total of 10 rounds of ammunition, was placed under the barrel. Once the mechanism was open, an extractor ejected the spent cartridge. A fresh round of ammunition was pushed into a shaped recess on top of the falling block by the spring in the magazine, whereupon the falling block rose slightly. The round could then be pushed into the chamber by the shooter, and the breechblock would rise completely. This rising of the breechblock (by means of a powerful spring) could catch the shooter off guard, resulting in pinched skin on the thumb.

== Military trials ==
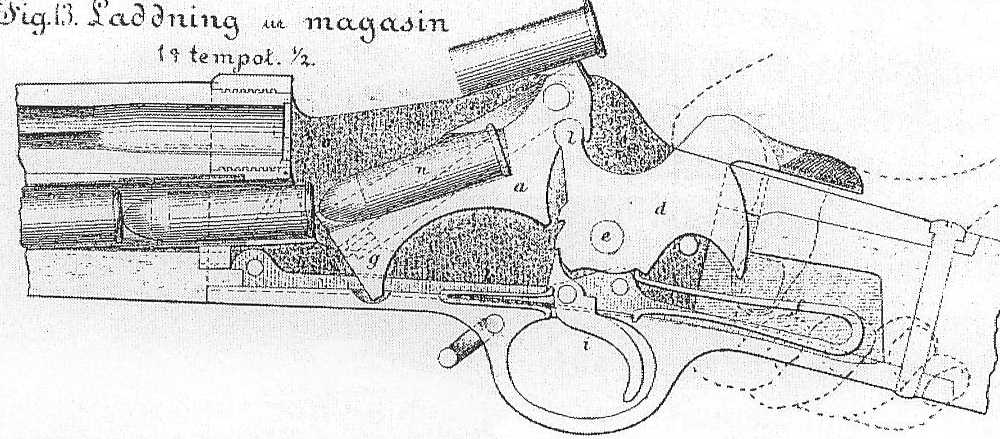
Spent round is pulled out by the extractor, while a fresh round is pushed into the "bed" on the breechblock.

The new round is chambered manually, and the breechblock rises while the hammer stays cocked.

In 1872, Krag presented his design to a Norwegian/Swedish Artillery Committee. Towards the end of 1872, this committee reported its findings. It was recommended that a refined model of the Krag–Petersson be tested further. These tests were undertaken in 1873 and 1874, with generally positive findings. The reports in particular praised the accuracy of the rifle, the rate of fire and the fact that the ejector worked without fail. The reason for the last praise was that the ejector on the Remington M1867 – the standard rifle in the Norwegian Army – often did not eject the empty cartridge when the rifle had been fired for a while.

During development, it was found that the rifle was not only solidly designed and well engineered, but it was also capable of firing 18 to 19 aimed shots a minute when used as a single loader – faster than the standard Remington M1867's 13 aimed shots per minute. When used as a magazine loader, it was found that 11 shots – ten in the magazine and one in the chamber – could be fired in 25 seconds. Tests carried out during the evaluation also indicated that the rifle was more accurate than the Remington M1867, although both weapons were firing the same ammunition from identical barrels. The rifle was also found to be extremely rugged – one of the tests carried out consisted of throwing the rifle repeatedly from a height of 4 meters (13 feet) towards a rocky surface in order to see if any of the rounds in the magazine would go off. Even modern firearms would be damaged by this treatment, but the Krag–Petersson survived it with only superficial damage to the woodwork.

After the tests were concluded, the committee recommended several Krag–Petersson rifles be manufactured and distributed to a selected army unit for troop trials. After careful consideration, 30 rifles were manufactured and issued to the King's Guard for use on their annual exercises in 1875. These 30 rifles differ from the later rifles by being 35 mm (1.4 in) shorter. During the troop trials, roughly 500 rounds were fired from each rifle, or about 15,000 in total. The feedback on the rifles was excellent, comparing it most favourably to the standard Remington M1867 rifles. The function of the extractor was particularly praised in the official reports.

Despite this, the committee did not recommend the Krag–Petersson as a standard-issue weapon for the Norwegian and Swedish armies, primarily because the round it was designed around was considered to be obsolete. At the same time, the committee had already started testing the Jarmann M1884 bolt action rifle. However, the Royal Norwegian Navy decided to adopt it as their standard arm in 1876, pointing out that they still were using the old M1860 "Kammerlader" ("chamber-loader") modified to fire the 4 linjer rimfire round. It was also clear that the Jarmann, if adopted, would first be issued to the Army, leaving the Navy without a modern arm for at least another decade.

== Deployment ==
A round is on the breechblock, waiting for the shooter to push it into the chamber

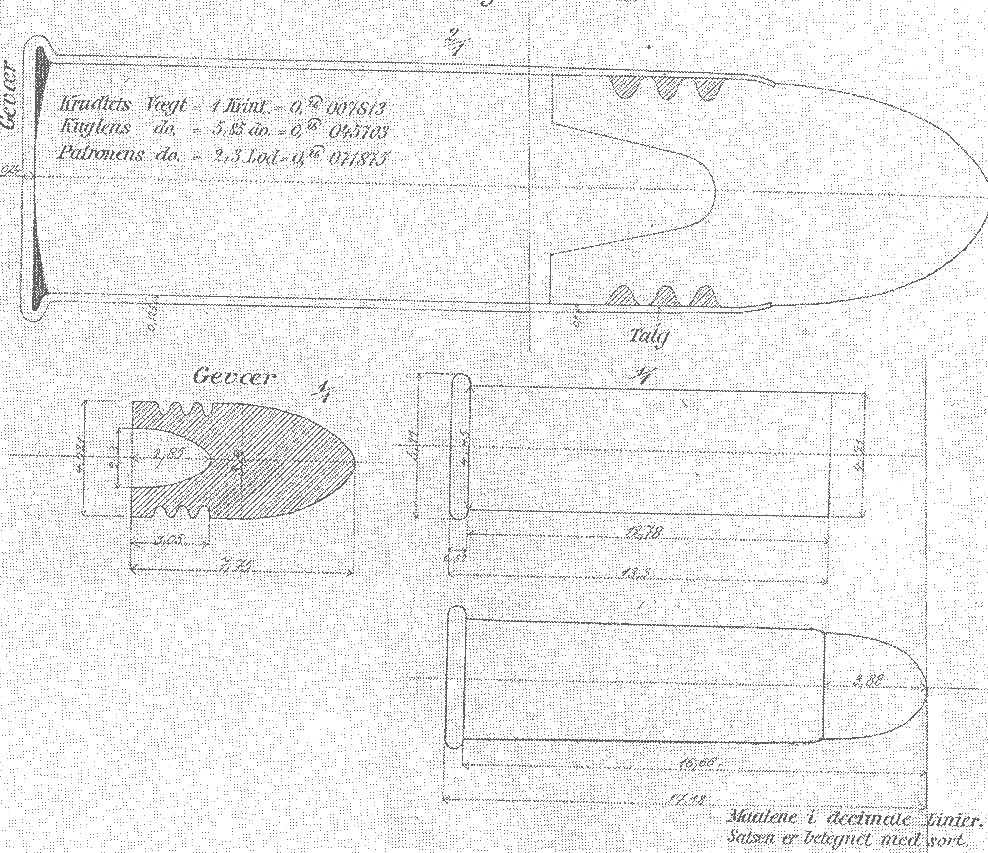
The 12.17 mm rimfire round used in the M1867 and the Krag–Petersson.

The initial order placed by the Royal Norwegian Navy for the Krag–Petersson was for 450 rifles, but the order was later amended to raise the total to 975. The weapon was ordered and delivered complete with the requisite equipment, such as a tampion, oil bottle and straps.

The weapon as approved for use was chambered for the 4 linjer rimfire ammunition already in use in the Remington M1867 rifles by Norwegian and Swedish armed forces, and apparently equipped with identical barrels to the Remington. While the ammunition was nominally 4 linjer, the calibre of the barrel was 3.88 linjer (12.17 mm or 0.479 in), while the uncoated lead bullet had a diameter of 4.021 linjer (12.62 mm or 0.497 in).

Since Kongsberg Våpenfabrikk – the main armoury in Norway – was manufacturing Remington M1867s for the Norwegian army, the Krag–Peterssons were manufactured partly by Carl Gustafs Stads Gevärsfaktori (serial numbers 1 through 200 and 301 through 700) in Sweden, and partly by Carl Johans Vern (serial numbers 201 through 300 and 701 through 975) in Norway. A handful (about 17) were manufactured at Kongsberg Våpenfabrikk, although these likely were development models and prototypes, since Krag was working there at the time.

== Bayonet for the Krag–Petersson ==
The bayonet for the Krag–Petersson

A bayonet was issued for each rifle, and each was individually numbered to the rifle to which it belonged. The bayonet was a so-called sabre bayonet, with a yatagan (S-shaped) blade and a prominent fuller, a wooden grip and brass guard and pommel. By modern standards the bayonet was rather large, with a total length of 71 cm (28 in), of which 57 cm (22 in) was the blade. Today, a bayonet in original condition is as hard to find as the Krag–Petersson itself, and it is often mistaken for a Remington M1867 bayonet. A well-preserved bayonet can fetch around $1,000 U.S. if it is in good condition.

The bayonet was almost identical to the bayonet issued with the Remington M1867, but was numbered on the guard as opposed to the blade itself. The available sources seems to indicate this was done because the bayonets were fitted to the rifles after the blade had been hardened, while the bayonets for the M1867 was fitted to the M1867 before the blade was hardened. The reason for this is that Kongsberg Våpenfabrikk manufactured the bayonets, and shipped them to Carl Johans Vern where they were fitted to the individual rifles.

== Evaluation in other countries ==
The Krag–Petersson was one of the earliest repeating rifles in the world, and as such generated considerable interest in Europe and the rest of the world. It was tested by several countries, but despite good reports and much praise was not adopted by any other nation than Norway. Most probably, the main reason for this is that the rifle was designed around an outdated cartridge, and there was doubt that the action could be modified for more powerful ammunition.

In 1876, the Danish military tested two preproduction rifles delivered from Norway, and were impressed enough to manufacture slightly modified 115 Krag–Peterssons in 1877 for troop trials. Despite the good results, the Danes decided not to adopt the Krag–Petersson. Krag did not receive any royalties on the production in Denmark, but was later made a knight of the Order of the Dannebrog, as thanks for his efforts both with the Danish Krag–Peterssons and for his efforts with the Krag–Jørgensen the Danes adopted in 1889.

France also tested the Krag–Petersson, and adopted – without asking – the "magazine regulator" of the Krag–Petersson for their Kropatschek rifle. As a form of compensation, Krag was later made a knight of Légion d'honneur. Russia and Brazil tested the Krag–Petersson without adopting it, and Krag travelled Europe extensively to market the Krag–Petersson.

== Fate of the Krag–Petersson rifles ==
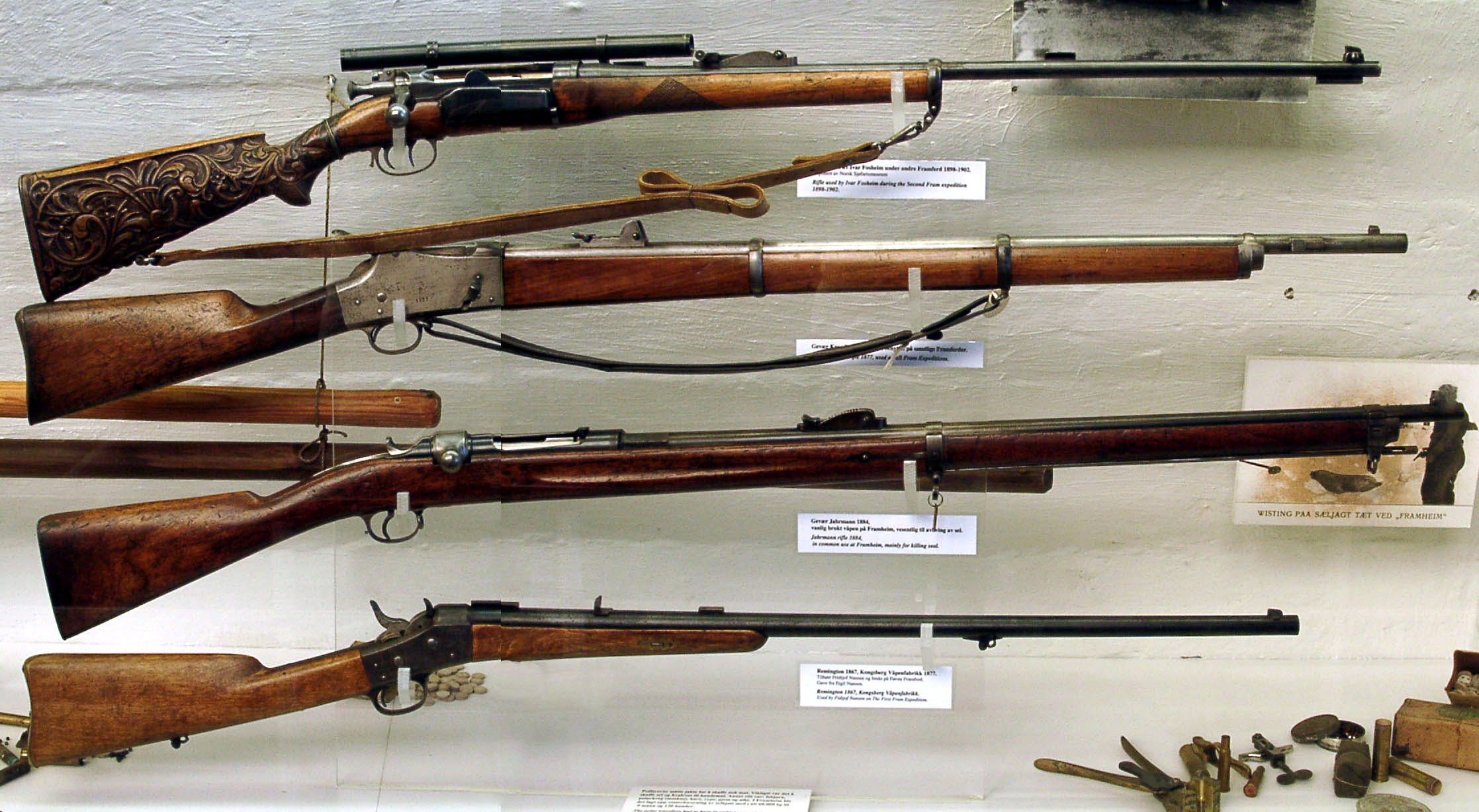
A collection of rifles from the Fram Museum, with Roald Amundsen's Krag–Petersson second from the top.

The Krag–Petersson remained in use in the Royal Norwegian Navy for almost 25 years, alongside the Jarmann, and, from 1896, the Krag–Jørgensen. By 1900, they were considered obsolete and sold to civilians, many of whom rebuilt the rifles to centerfire and in a few cases to shotguns. The details of the sales are lacking, although it is known that in 1928 only 70 Krag–Peterssons remained in military warehouses. It is likely that these were considered unsellable and scrapped. Today the Krag–Petersson is very rare, and unaltered specimens can fetch high prices, from US$2,000.

As a curiosity, Roald Amundsen owned a Krag–Petersson with the serial number 168, probably bought from the Royal Norwegian Navy just after 1900. It is unclear if this rifle accompanied him on expeditions, but it is on display at the Fram museum in Oslo.

== Comparison with contemporary rifles ==
The Krag–Petersson is often said to be a good rifle. By comparing it to the Remington M1867, which was the standard-issue rifle in the Norwegian Army, as well as against the standard service rifles of Germany, France and the United Kingdom at the time, it is quite clear that the Krag–Petersson suffered from having been designed for an outdated cartridge.

Rifle	Krag–Petersson	Remington M1867	Mauser Gewehr 71	Gras rifle	Martini–Henry
Accuracy at 600 m	82 cm (32 in)	96 cm (38 in)	80 cm (31 in)	89 cm (35 in)	Unknown
Enfilading	300 m (980 ft)	300 m (980 ft)	350 m (1,150 ft)	379 m (1,243 ft)	346 m (1,135 ft)
Effective range	900 m (3,000 ft)	900 m (3,000 ft)	Unknown	Unknown	1,372 m (4,501 ft)
Rate of fire	19 or 28 (see article)	13	Unknown	Unknown	8 to 12
Magazine capacity	10	None	None	None	None
Calibre	12.17x44 rimfire	12.17×44 rimfire	11.15×60mmR center fire	11×59R center fire	.577/450 (11.455×65R) center fire
Muzzle velocity	381 m/s (1,250 ft/s)	381 m/s (1,250 ft/s)	430 m/s (1,400 ft/s)	455 m/s (1,490 ft/s)	416 m/s (1,360 ft/s)
Barrel length	951 mm (37.4 in)	951 mm (37.4 in)	855 mm (33.7 in)	822 mm (32.4 in)	840 mm (33 in)
Total length	Unknown	1,355 mm (53.3 in)	1,350 mm (53 in)	1,305 mm (51.4 in)	1,245 mm (49.0 in)
Loaded weight	Unknown	4.32 kg (9.5 lb)	4.5 kg (9.9 lb)	4.15 kg (9.1 lb)	3.83 kg (8.4 lb)

== See also ==
Other Norwegian rifles:

- Kammerlader
- Remington M1867
- Jarmann M1884
- Krag–Jørgensen

Comparable weapons from the same era:

- The German Mauser Gewehr 71 and 71/84
- The French Gras rifle and the various Kropatscheks
- The British Martini–Henry
- The Russian Berdan Type II
- The American M1870 Sharps and Winchester-Hotchkiss

== Notes and references ==
- Hanevik, Karl Egil (1998). Norske Militærgeværer etter 1867. Hanevik Våpen. ISBN 82-993143-1-3. Chapter 2 and appendix A
- Wikborg, Trond, Krag–Petersson M1876 Last retrieved 18 August 2005
