= Jacob Smith Jarmann =

Norwegian firearms designer and inventor

- Born: Jacob Smith Jarmann; 30 May 1816; Nord-Fron in Oppland, Norway
- Died: 29 March 1894 (aged 77); Kristiania, Norway
- Occupations: firearms designer and inventor

Jacob Smith Jarmann (30 May 1816 – 29 March 1894) was a Norwegian firearms designer and inventor of the Jarmann rifle.

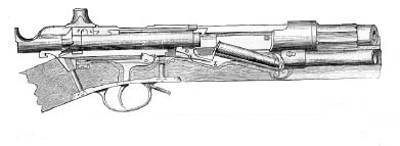
Cross section of the Jarmann M1884

== Biography ==
Jarmann was born and raised at the Øien farm in the traditional district of Gudbrandsdalen (in the present-day Nord-Fron Municipality in Innlandet county) in Norway. He developed an interest in firearms at an early age, and he designed his first rifle—a breech loading rifle firing cardboard cartridges—in 1838, but this was turned down by the armed forces at the time. The logic was that a rifle capable of firing 13 shots a minute would be impossible to supply with enough ammunition.

In the 1870s he stepped down from the daily running of his workshop to develop his newly invented bolt action rifle. This rifle, the Jarmann, was adopted by the Norwegian Army in 1884. The weapon was produced at the Kongsberg Weapon Factory (Kongsberg Våpenfabrikk).

Jarmann was appointed a Knight of the Order of St. Olav and made a member of the Order of Vasa. He died in 1894, the same year his rifle was phased out of the service and replaced with the Krag–Jørgensen. After the Jarmann rifle was phased out of military use, some of the weapons were converted for use as the Jarmann harpoon rifle.

== Other sources ==
- Hanevik, Karl Egil (1998) Norske militærgeværer etter 1867 (Hanevik våpen) ISBN 978-82-993143-1-2
- Hanevik, Karl Egil Kongsberg-Colten (Hanevik våpen) ISBN 978-82-993143-2-9

== Related reading ==
- Flatnes, Oyvind (2014) From Musket to Metallic Cartridge (Crowood Press) ISBN 978-18-479759-3-5
