= Kammerlader =

Kammerlader / Kammarladdare
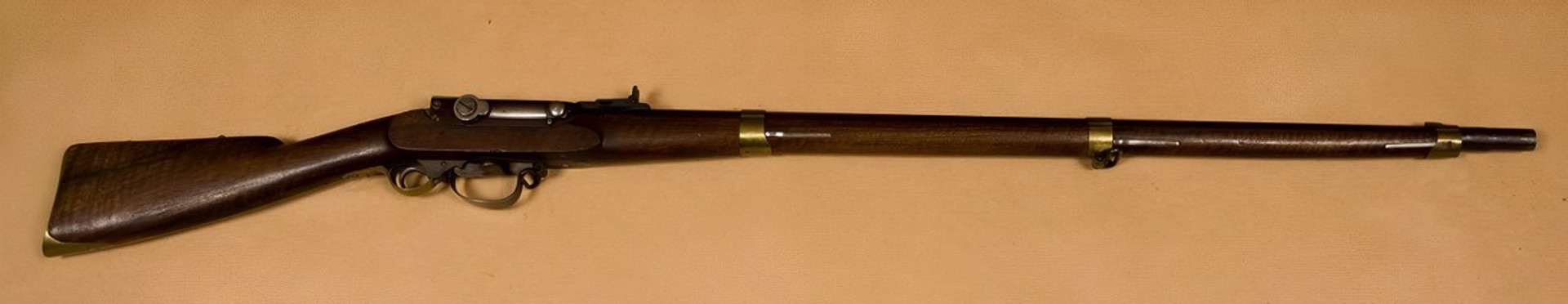
- Kammerlader m/1857
- Type: Breech-loading rifle
- Place of origin: Sweden–Norway

Service history
- In service: 1842–1870
- Used by: Norway; Sweden

Production history
- Designed: 1842
- No. built: More than 40,000
- Variants: See § Variants

Specifications (M1849/55)
- Mass: 5 kg (11.02 lb)
- Length: 126 cm (49.61 in)
- Barrel length: 78 cm (30.71 in)
- Cartridge: Original: Minié ball in paper cartridge; Lund conversion: 12.17×44mm RF
- Caliber: Minié ball: 8 mm; Lund: 12.7 mm
- Rate of fire: 6–8 rounds/m (Note: Depended on how quickly the shooter could reload.)
- Muzzle velocity: 265–350 m/s (870–1,150 ft/s)
- Maximum firing range: Accurate to 1,100 m (1,200 yd)
- Feed system: single-shot
- Sights: V-notch and front post

The kammerlader in Norwegian, or kammarladdare in Swedish, meaning "chamber loader" (full Norwegian: Kammerladergevær, Swedish: kammarladdningsgevär, German: Kammerladungsgewehr, "chamber loader rifle"), was a Swedish-Norwegian breech-loading rifle from the mid 19th century, the first such to adopted by the countries, and among the first breech-loaders adopted for use by an armed force anywhere in the world. A single-shot black-powder rifle, the kammerlader was operated with a crank mounted on the side of the receiver. This made it much quicker and easier to load than the weapons previously used. Kammerladers quickly gained a reputation for being fast and accurate rifles, and would have been a deadly weapon against massed ranks of infantry.

The kammerlader was introduced in 1842, and it is thought that about 40,000 were manufactured until about 1870. While the first flintlock breech-loading rifles, such as the Ferguson, were launched decades before 1842, Norway was among the first European countries to introduce breech loaders on a large scale throughout its army and navy. The kammerladers were manufactured in several different models, and most models were at some point modified in some way or other.

The kammerladers were phased out as more modern rifles were approved for use. They were either modified for rimfire cartridges, sold off to civilians or melted for scrap. Rifles sold to civilians were often modified for use as shotguns or hunting firearms. Today it is hard to find an unmodified kammerlader, and collectors often pay high prices for them.

== Development ==
In the early 19th century, the Norwegian Army decided that the nature of warfare was changing away from the massed ranks firing in volleys towards smaller units advancing and firing independently. This conclusion was reached after having observed the American Revolutionary War, the Napoleonic Wars and the short Swedish campaign against Norway in 1814. Lessons were also learned from the Gunboat War, where small, mobile gunboats outmaneuvered larger, more heavily armed ships. It was decided that a breech loaded rifle was needed, more accurate than the old smoothbore muskets, yet quicker to load than the rifles issued to the Norwegian Jeger and Skijeger units. A special committee was created, and it started considering various firearm actions in 1837. It was soon clear that the desired weapon should:

- have a reduced caliber compared to the then standard musket;
- have reliable ignition, with the means of the caplock mechanism (earlier muskets had been equipped with the flintlock mechanism);
- be quicker to load than the musket, and therefore be a breech loader; and
- be more accurate than the old smoothbore muskets.

The result was that a modern, breech-loading rifle was approved for use on the 18 May 1842. The caliber chosen for the new rifle was 18 lødig (gauge); in other words, one could manufacture 18 round bullets out of one Norwegian pound of lead. In modern terms this means the caliber of the rifle was 17.5 mm.

From 1842, until the Remington M1867 was approved in 1867, more than 40,000 kammerladers in more than 80 different models were manufactured. In 1860 the caliber was reduced again, to four Swedish Linjer, (Note: The reason Norway choose to use a Swedish measurement for the caliber can be found in the fact that Norway and Sweden were in a union at the time, and the military of both nations had an agreement that they would choose weapons with interchangeable ammunition. Later this resulted in both nations adopting the 12.17 × 44 rim fire cartridge in 1867 and the 6.5 × 55 cartridge in 1894.) or about 11.77 mm. When some of the Kammerladers were modified to rimfire after 1867, this meant that the barrels had to be bored out to 12.17 mm to accept the new cartridge.

During a military sharpshooting competition held in Belgium in 1861, the Kammerlader was proven to be among the most accurate military long arms in Europe. The Norwegian rifles were shown to be accurate to a range of about 1 km (0.6 mi), which is quite an achievement even by today's standards.

== Design features ==
Every breechloader must have some form of mechanism that allows the breech to be opened for loading, yet securely locked for firing. This was even more important in the early designs made before the introduction of the cartridge. Achieving a gas-tight seal was difficult with the metallurgy of the day, and it can be argued that the Norwegian kammerladers are the first fully successful military breechloaders — the needle gun was slightly earlier, but it leaks a significant gas pressure around the breech. A crank mounted on the side of the weapon operates the kammerlader. Rotating the crank opens the breech of the weapon, allowing for loading. The use of paper cartridges — a pre-measured amount of gunpowder and a lead bullet wrapped in paper — also sped up the rate of fire. While not as fast as more modern rifles, which use fixed cartridges, the kammerlader was much faster than contemporary muzzle-loading rifles. The loading sequence is as follows (refer to picture):

1. The hammer mounted under the weapon is cocked.
2. The crank is rotated, opening the breech.
3. A percussion cap is placed on the nipple.
4. A pre measured amount of gunpowder is poured into the breech, and the paper from the paper cartridge is used as wadding.
5. The bullet is placed in the chamber.
6. The crank is rotated forwards, locking the breech and making the rifle ready to fire.

The exact rate of firing with the kammerlader depends, as with all manually operated weapons, entirely on the shooter. While the sources do not give any indication as to the rate of fire attainable by the average soldier, it is known that it was higher than for a muzzle loading musket — roughly four rounds a minute — and most probably lower than the contemporary German needle gun's 10 to 12 rounds a minute, since the kammerlader has a more elaborate loading procedure.

Most of the rifles were modified during their service life. The first major modification was the change from a fixed rear sight mounted behind the receiver to an adjustable rear sight mounted in front of it. The first of the adjustable rear sights was a 'flip over' type: an L-shaped piece of metal that was hinged so it could 'flip' over. Later this was again modified to a design known in Norway as a 'ski hill sight'; a simple, yet functional, adjustable tangent sight. In principle, this latest sight doesn't differ from the iron sights found on most modern firearms. Towards the end of the service life of the kammerladers, most of the small bore rifles were modified to allow the use of rim fire ammunition.

== Ammunition ==
The kammerlader was designed to use paper cartridges — a pre-measured amount of gunpowder and a lead bullet wrapped in paper — both to speed up and simplify loading the weapon. In the early days of the rifle most units used round bullets in their weapons, but in 1855 it was decided that all units should use the a conical ball instead since this gave better accuracy. The paper was wrapped around the cylindrical section of the bullet and secured with wool string secured in the grooves. The end of the bullet was then covered in melted tallow, before the black powder was filled in behind the bullet and the end wrapped. For the 18 lødig rifles, a load of 96 grains (6.22 g) was used. Sources vary in the reported muzzle velocity, but it is known that during tests in 1849, the bullet penetrated 2 inches (51 mm) of wood at a distance of 800 alen (500 m).

== Rimfire conversions ==
After the introduction of the Remington M1867 and its rimfire cartridge in 1867, the Norwegian Army and the Royal Norwegian Navy decided to convert some of the stock of kammerladers into rim fire rifles. There were two designs used for the modification: Landmarks and Lunds. Neither can be considered completely successful, but both were cheaper, and quicker, than manufacturing new M1867s. It seems that the Norwegian Army preferred the Lund, while the Landmark was the option of choice for the Royal Norwegian Navy.

For the Lund conversion, the chamber was replaced with a breechblock, and an extractor was mounted on the left side of the receiver. A chamber fitting the 12.17 x 44 mm rimfire cartridge was milled out of the rear part of the barrel. The right side of the receiver was lowered 6 mm and the bottom plate exchanged from a brass plate to a steel plate with a track for the extractor. The firing pin was curved to allow the hammer to strike it.

The Landmark conversion refers to a modification invented by Jens Landmark. The chamber, which on a kammerlader is a separate piece tilted up and to the rear, is opened as before, but can be tilted further backwards by means of a hinge in the middle of the chamber. The 12.17 x 44 mm rim fire cartridge is placed backwards, facing the shooter, before everything is rolled back forward. The only part to be modified was the chamber and a curving firing pin was added where the nipple for the cap had been. Pictures showing the Landmark conversion can be found here

A number of the kammerladers were also converted with the Remington action, by replacing the receivers but keeping the barrels and woodwork. These can be distinguished from ordinary Remington M1867s by having a shorter receiver with more rounded corners. It is unknown how many kammerladers were modified in this fashion.

== Variants ==
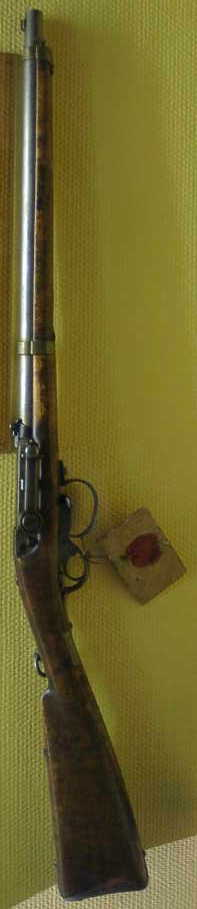
Naval Kammerlader M1857, with serial number 1. The tag secured to the rifle is the official approval of the model. Note that this rifle has not been modified to the M1857/67 standard.

The kammerlader rifles were manufactured over a period of 25 years (1842 to 1867) in a wide range of both military and civilian models. Almost all the military rifles were modified once or more, resulting in a very wide range of different models for a collector to collect.

- M1842 Army kammerlader. The first model manufactured, differed from later models with a narrower hammer. Production numbers are unknown, but very limited. It can be considered an experimental model.
- M1845 Navy kammerlader. Very rare in original state. Only 100 were manufactured in 1845. Outwardly very similar to M1842. The barrel is mounted to the stock with three brass bands.
- M1846/55 Army kammerlader. At first glance very similar to the M1842, but a closer inspection reveals substantial differences. Most pronounced is the different style of hammer. Unlike the M1842, which had a narrow, ridge like hammer, the M1846 is wider and had a bigger handle. Most M1846 saw a lot of service and show wear. In 1855, the rear sight was modified and moved, changing the designation to M1842/55. It is hard to find an unmodified rifle today. Some 6000 rifles were manufactured; 3000 at Kongsberg Våpenfabrik, while Crause in Herzberg and Francotte in Liège produced an additional 1,500 each.
- M1849 Navy kammerlader. Mostly similar to the M1845. 500 were manufactured in 1849. Most were later converted to rim fire.
- M1849/55 Army kammerlader. Probably the second most common large bore kammerlader, with a total production of more than 10,000 rifles (2,000 produced by A. Francotte in Liège, Crause in Hertzberg produced another 2,000 and Kongsberg Våpenfabrikk 6,021). In addition, a further 4.500 were manufactured at Kongsberg Våpenfabrikk in 1855 directly as M1849/55. There were a couple of improvements on the M1849, compared to the earlier model. The hammer was widened for a better grip, the butt plate was bent up under the stock in order to protect this better. As far as is known, all the M1849 had fitted new rear sights in 1855, attached with a band around the barrel — or at least no unmodified M1849 are known today. Since this is such a common variation, it is also one of the more affordable for a collector.
- Swedish M1851 kammarladdningsgevär för flottan (chamber loader for the Navy). Two brass bands securing the barrel to the stock, a ring on the hammer for cocking and a caliber of 14.8 mm. Otherwise it looks quite similar to Norwegian kammerladers. While much more modern than the Swedish rifles in service at the time, the M1851 was considered a failure and probably was not issued for service.
- M1852/67 Navy kammerlader. One of the more common naval kammerladers, this was a short, small bore (18 Lødig, about 18 bore) rifle in which the barrel was attached to the stock with three brass bands. It also had a 'ski hill' rear sight. This was the last of the naval kammerladers with three bands. Virtually all were converted to rim fire in 1867 by means of the Landmark conversion. It is believed that about 500 were manufactured.
- M1855/67 Navy kammerlader. This must be considered a product improved M1852. Major differences were the number of bands (the M1855 used just two), a different rear sight and the shape of the stock. After the introduction of the rim fire Remington M1867, they were modified with the Landmark conversion, the sights being altered to a rocking pattern graduated up to 800 alen (500 m).
- M1857/67 Navy kammerlader. Identical to the M1855, except the shape of the butt plate. It is assumed that a total of 300 or so were manufactured, all of which were probably modified to rim fire in 1867.
- M1859 Army kammerlader. A short rifle with two bands, it was produced for the Sharpshooter Company in Stockholm (today known as the Kings Guard), for the Jegers and for sergeants in the infantry. The majority of the M1859 was converted from M1849, M1855 and possibly also from the M1846 rifles. Only the numbers between 10858 and 12183 were originally manufactured as M1859's. Today, it remains the most common large bore kammerlader available to a collector.
- M1860/67 Navy kammerlader. The first of the naval small bore kammerladers, and the only naval kammerlader with just two bands. Virtually all were converted to rim fire with the Landmark conversion.
- M1860/67 Long Army. Originally a 4 Linjers (11.77 mm) caliber derivative of the M1855, this long rifle had hexagonal Whitworth-style rifling. It was fitted either with a simple two-leaf rocking sight (on rifles issued to the rank and file) or with a tangent-leaf on rifles issued to snipers. In total about 8,500 were manufactured between 1860 and 1867, the majority later converted to rim fire with the Lunds conversion. In addition, about 1,600 were manufactured with the conversion from new between 1868 and 1870.
- M1860/67 Short Army. The same weapon as the Long Lund, except in carbine form. About 3,200 were manufactured between 1862 and 1866. Identical in most respects to the Naval M1860, except that it was modified to rim fire with the Lunds conversion.
- M1862/66 Artillery carbine. This diminutive weapon had a barrel less than half as long as the M1860. Everything except the bore seems to be scaled down from a M1859 or similar, and the gun might be hard to identify as an M1862 from pictures alone. Production numbers unknown; all are thought to have been modified with the Lund conversion to rim fire in 1869.

== Fate of the kammerladers ==
The kammerladers were phased out as more modern weapons became available — the Remington M1867, the Krag–Petersson (adopted by the Royal Norwegian Navy in 1876), and the Jarmann M1884. It is likely that the last of the modified naval kammerladers was not finally removed from military warehouses until after the Krag–Jørgensen was approved for use in 1894, although sources are scarce on this. The rifles were either sold to civilians or melted down for scrap.

Most of the rifles sold to civilians were turned into hunting implements, by replacing the barrel and/or the woodwork. Some of these were supposedly used for illegal hunting during World War II, when the occupying Germans had seized all modern weapons owned by civilians. Today it is hard to find a kammerlader in original condition, or indeed at all.

== Comparison with contemporary rifles ==
The kammerlader is often claimed to be an outstanding weapon for its time. The only contemporary European rifle which it can be compared to is the Prussian needle gun — the only other breech loader adopted for service in the 1840s.

Rifle	Kammerlader M1849/55	Prussian Needle rifle M/41
Effective range	1,000 m (1,100 yd)	600 m (660 yd)
Rate of fire	6 – 8 rounds/minute (guesstimate)	6 rounds/minute
Calibre	17.5 mm (0.69 in)	15.4 mm (0.61 in)
Muzzle velocity	265–350 m/s (870–1,150 ft/s) (Note: The sources are unclear, but varies between these two extremes. Possible because there are so many models of the kammerlader out there.)	305 m/s (1,000 ft/s)
Barrel length	78 cm (31 in)	91 cm (36 in)
Total length	126 cm (50 in)	142 cm 55.9 in)
Loaded weight	5 kg (11 lb)	4.7 kg (10 lb)

== See also ==
=== Norwegian rifles ===
- Remington M1867
- Krag–Petersson
- Jarmann M1884
- Krag–Jørgensen

=== Contemporary rifles ===
- The United States' Springfield model 1842 smoothbore musket, and Springfield model 1855 and Springfield Model 1861 rifled muskets.
- The German breechloading needle gun was adopted in 1841 but was not issued to troops until 1848.

=== Earlier breechloading rifles ===
- M1819 Hall rifle
- Ferguson rifle
