= Remington M1867 =

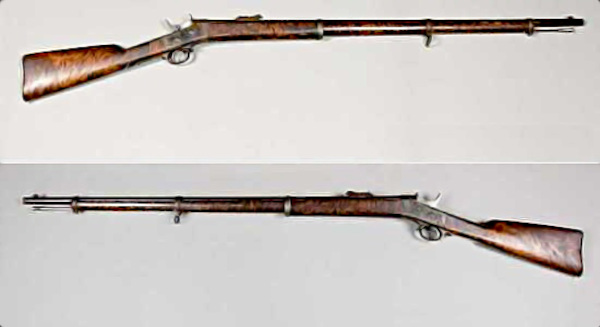
- Swedish m/1867 rifle. Pattern (Modellexemplar), serial # 1.
- Type: Rolling-block rifle
- Place of origin: United States; Norway; Sweden

Service history
- In service: 1867–mid 1890s (rifle); 1888–1908 (modified carbines)

Production history
- Designer: Joseph Rider
- Designed: 1866
- No. built: Remington, USA: 10,000 rifles Norway: 53,450 rifles (of which 5,000 were later converted to carbines); Sweden: 237,000-257,000 rifles and carbines, including conversions of older rifles to rolling block. About 5,000 of the rifles made in Sweden were delivered to Norway while the rest of the production was for Sweden
- Variants: Norway: M1867, M1888 and M1891 Carbine conversions Sweden: Among others rifles m/1867, m/1867-68, m/1860-67, m/1864-68 and carbines m/1870 and m/1864-68-85

Specifications
- Mass: Rifle: 4,32 kg, 9.6 lb Carbine: 2.88 kg 6.3 lbs
- Length: Rifle 1353 mm, 53.27 in Carbine (m/1870): 860 mm, 33.86 in
- Barrel length: Rifle: 951 mm, 37.44 in Carbine (m/1870): 460 mm, 18.11 in
- Cartridge: 12.17×42mm RF rimfire 12.17×44mm RF rimfire 12.17×44mmR centerfire 10.15×61mmR Jarmann centerfire 8×58mmR Danish Krag centerfire
- Action: Rolling-block
- Rate of fire: 13 rounds/minute
- Muzzle velocity: Original rifles and carbines in 12.17 mm Rifle: 386 m/s, 1,266 ft/s Carbine: 340 m/s, 1,115 ft/s
- Effective firing range: 300 metres (330 yd) (with iron sight)
- Maximum firing range: ~900 metres (980 yd)
- Feed system: Breech-loading
- Sights: V-notch and front post

The Remington M1867 is a rolling-block rifle that was produced in the second half of the 19th century. It was the first rifle using metallic cartridges to be adopted by the Norwegian and Swedish armies. Nominally, it had a caliber of 4 decimal lines, but the actual caliber was 3.88 Norwegian decimal lines or 4.1 Swedish decimal lines (12.17 mm), and it fired a rimfire round with a 12.615 mm (.497 in) lead bullet. The 12.17 mm caliber was chosen because the Swedish army had approximately 30,000 new muzzle-loading M1860 and breech-loading M1864 rifles in 12.17 mm caliber in stock, rifles that were suitable for conversion to M1867 rolling-block rifles. With the exception of the first 10,000 rifles and 20,000 actions (for conversions of older rifles), which were made by Remington in the US, all Remington M1867 rifles and carbines were made under license in Norway and Sweden, by Kongsberg Vaapenfabrik in Norway, and by Husqvarna Vapenfabriks Aktiebolag and Carl Gustafs stads Gevärsfaktori in Sweden with the two Swedish manufacturers producing about 80% of the weapons.

== Birth of the M1867 ==
In the 1860s the Norwegian and Swedish armies realized that their standard rifles, both percussion lock breech-loading rifles and muzzle loaders, were rapidly becoming obsolete in the face of the new metal cartridge combining bullet, primer and propellant load. In early October 1866, a joint Swedish-Norwegian arms commission was established in order to select a suitable cartridge and rifle for the two nations.

Several different cartridges and rifles were considered by the commission. A partial list includes:

- Needle-guns

- A Prussian needle gun designed in 1866.
- Larsen and Steenstrup - two different modifications of the standard issue army rifle at the time.
- A modified Swedish standard army rifle.

- Non-repeating rifles for metallic cartridges:

- Peabody - American lever-action
- Remington - American, rolling-block
- Larsen - two related, but different Norwegian designs. One lever-action, one bolt action

- Repeating rifles for metallic cartridges:

- Spencer - American design, removable magazine in the buttstock
- Henry - American design, tubular magazine under the barrel
- Larsen - Norwegian modification of the Henry

- Repeating rifles for paper cartridges:

- Palmcrantz - Swedish design (See Helge Palmcrantz)

- Percussion rifles:

- Burnside - American design with metallic cartridge
- Sharps - American design using paper cartridges

After various tests, including repeated firings, it was clear that the needle guns were not particularly well-suited. These - along with the repeating rifles - were dropped from further testing. Further testing - which included test firing by previously untrained troops - showed that both the Peabody and the Remington was suitable for issuing to the field army. In the end, the commission based their decision on price and complexity. The Remington totalled a mere 25 parts to the Peabody's 37, and it was approved for use by both the Norwegian and the Swedish armed forces, as their standard military rifle, on 22 November 1867.

== The M1867 in Norway ==
A grand total of 58,450 Remington M1867 were delivered to the Norwegian Armed Forces from 1867 until 1883, when production was curtailed to make room for the Jarmann M1884. All production rifles were meant to be manufactured at Kongsberg Våpenfabrik in Norway, but since the factory needed to be upgraded with more modern machinery, 5000 of the first rifles delivered to the Norwegian Army were manufactured by Husqvarna Vapenfabrik in Sweden in 1871–72. The difference is minor, the Norwegian rifles have brass buttplates and head of the cleaning rod, and steel mounting bands, while Swedish rifles have iron furniture. For the first few years the barrels of the M1867 were made of iron, but after 1871, steel became the standardized material. The price for each barrel was slightly higher, but the better design reduced misfire damage and ultimately resulted in cost effectiveness. Additionally, the designers improved the lock by replacing two lockscrews with a lockplate.

From the early 1870s the Norwegian armed forces used the 12.17×44mm RF, which apart from the case length and overall length of the cartridge was identical to the original Norwegian-Swedish 12.17×42mm RF. In spite of the difference in length the two cartridges were interchangeable and could be chambered and fired in both Norwegian and Swedish rifles. The official military designation for the cartridge was '12mm Remington' from 1879.

The sight of the rifle was the last item to be standardized because no one could agree on which would be best. The early production rifles had an L-shaped sight that could be flipped over, but the final design was a unique combination of other ideas. Earlier models were supposed to be changed to this final design, but it is still possible to find M1867 with the original sights intact.

Each rifle was delivered with a sling, a long bayonet, a three-pronged screwdriver, an oil bottle, a cleaning rod, and a muzzle plug to stop moisture from getting into the barrel. Early muzzle plugs were a short, conical dowel made of wood, but soon a brass cup with a cut out for the front sight replaced it in service.

In 1880 Kongsberg Våpenfabrikk delivered 72 conversion kits for the rifles which allowed less expensive 22LR ammunition to be fired from the M1867 for training. These kits consisted simply of tubes to be inserted into the rifle from the breech, containing a chamber for the 22LR and a short barrel. The intention was to allow for cheaper training. Later, in 1884, several M1867 were permanently modified to fire 22LR with an improved model of this device.

After the Jarmann M1884 replaced the M1867 as the main rifle in the first lines of the Norwegian Army, the M1867 was delegated to rear units until at least the mid-1890s. Roughly 5,000 were modified in 1888 and 1891 into carbines, firing 8 mm rimmed centerfire ammunition. These remained in use until 1908, when they were finally replaced by Krag–Jørgensen carbines.

From 1900 onwards, the Norwegian Army sold the obsolete M1867 to the public for a nominal price. Many of these were converted into hunting rifles and shotguns, so that it has become difficult to find an M1867 in its original form.

The 8 mm carbine conversions were kept in reserve until World War II, when most of the estimated 4,900 units were destroyed by German forces.

Today, an unmodified M1867 in decent shape might be worth 4,000 - 6,000 Norwegian kroner (roughly 600 - 900 USD), while an M1867 in perfect condition might go for as much as 10,000 kroner (roughly US$1,500). However, as mentioned most of the M1867 were modified after they were sold to civilians, and most collectors seem to agree that the modified arms are worth a lot less.

== The M1867 in Sweden ==
About 200,000-220,000 military rifles and 7,000 military carbines using the m/1867 action were manufactured as complete weapons in Sweden, 100,000-120,000 rifles and 4,000 carbines by Carl Gustafs Stads Gevärsfaktori (a government owned arsenal) and 100,000 rifles and 3,000 carbines by Husqvarna Vapenfabriks Aktiebolag. In addition to that 10,000 complete rifles and 20,000 actions made in the US were bought from Remington. The standard rifle received the Swedish designation "gevär m/1867" (and a version with only minor differences the designation "gevär m/1867-68"). Approximately 30,000 Swedish muzzle-loading rifles m/1860 and breech-loading rifles m/1864 (some of which had been converted from m/1860, note that the Swedish breech-loading rifle m/1864 although being referred to as a "kammarladdare" was not the same rifle as the Norwegian Kammerlader) of the same caliber, rifles that were almost new and in most cases had never been used, were also converted to M1867s using rolling-block actions made both by Remington and in Sweden. The Swedish designations for the converted rifles were "gevär m/1860-68", "gevär m/1864-68" and "gevär m/1860-64-68" depending on how many steps of conversion they had gone through (the two latter conversions are easily recognized by having the rear sight very far back, a result of the barrels being shortened from the breech end). About 7,000 short carbines with the Swedish designation "karbin m/1870" were also made, and in addition to that about 9,600 "gevär m/1864-68" were shortened to carbine length in 1886-87 and given the designation "karbin m/1864-68-85". Other varieties were "gevär m/1867-74" with a new rear stock design and "kammarskjutningsgevär m/1884" and "kammarskjutningskarbin m/1884" in 10.15x61R Jarmann (rifles and carbines primarily used for gallery shooting, that is short range training).

Both M1867's for civilian use and M1867's used by the Swedish Frivilliga Skarpskytterörelsen ("The Volunteer Sharpshooter Movement", patterned on the British Volunteer Force and numbering 40,000 men in 1865, all of them provided with military rifles and wearing military style uniforms by the Swedish armed forces) were made for, or converted to, centerfire 12.17×44mmR cartridges since, unlike the 12.17×42mm rimfire cartridges used in the military, the centerfire cartridges could be reloaded. One model of Swedish military M1867 rifles modified to use the 12.17×44mmR centerfire cartridge was the "gevär m/1867-74".

A new Norwegian-Swedish arms commission set up in the 1880s suggested that the Norwegian M1884 Jarmann rifle should replace the m/1867 in both Norwegian and Swedish service but the Jarmann rifle was rejected by the Swedish Army since the 10.15x61mmR cartridge used by the Jarmann rifle was seen as being too little of an improvement over the 12.17 mm cartridge used in the M1867 rifles. So as a stop-gap measure rifles and carbines with rolling-block action were converted to a for that time period very modern centerfire cartridge, the 8×58mmR Danish Krag (bullet diameter .322 in/8.17mm, bullet weight 237 grains/15.29 grams, muzzle velocity 1,965 ft per second/600 m/s), with the designation "gevär m/1867-89" used for converted rifles and "gevär m/1889" used for new rifles. rolling-block rifles chambered for the 8×58mmR were shorter than the M1867 rifles, with an overall length of 1,240 mm (48.8 in) and a barrel length of 840 mm (33.1 in).

During the last years of the 19th century the M1867 in all its different guises was finally replaced in Swedish military service by Mauser bolt action repeating rifles and carbines (with a modified Mauser 1893 action), under the designations "karbin m/1894" and "gevär m/1896", in caliber 6.5×55mm.

The M1867 rifle became very popular among civilian hunters in Sweden, particularly for moose hunting, which led to Husqvarna Vapenfabrik producing about 85,000 rifles with the M1867 rolling-block action for the civilian market, in addition to the more than 100,000 they made for the armed forces. Surplus military rifles were also sold to civilians, most them being converted to 12.17×44mmR centerfire cartridges.

== Gallery ==
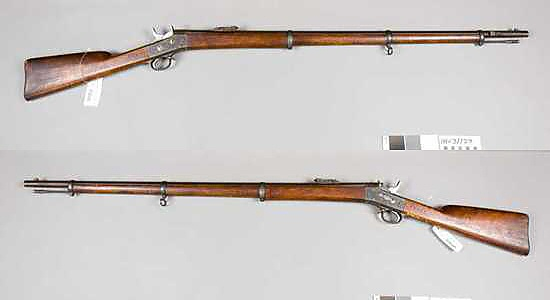
Norwegian-Swedish rifle m/1867, from the initial batch of M1867 made by Remington in the US

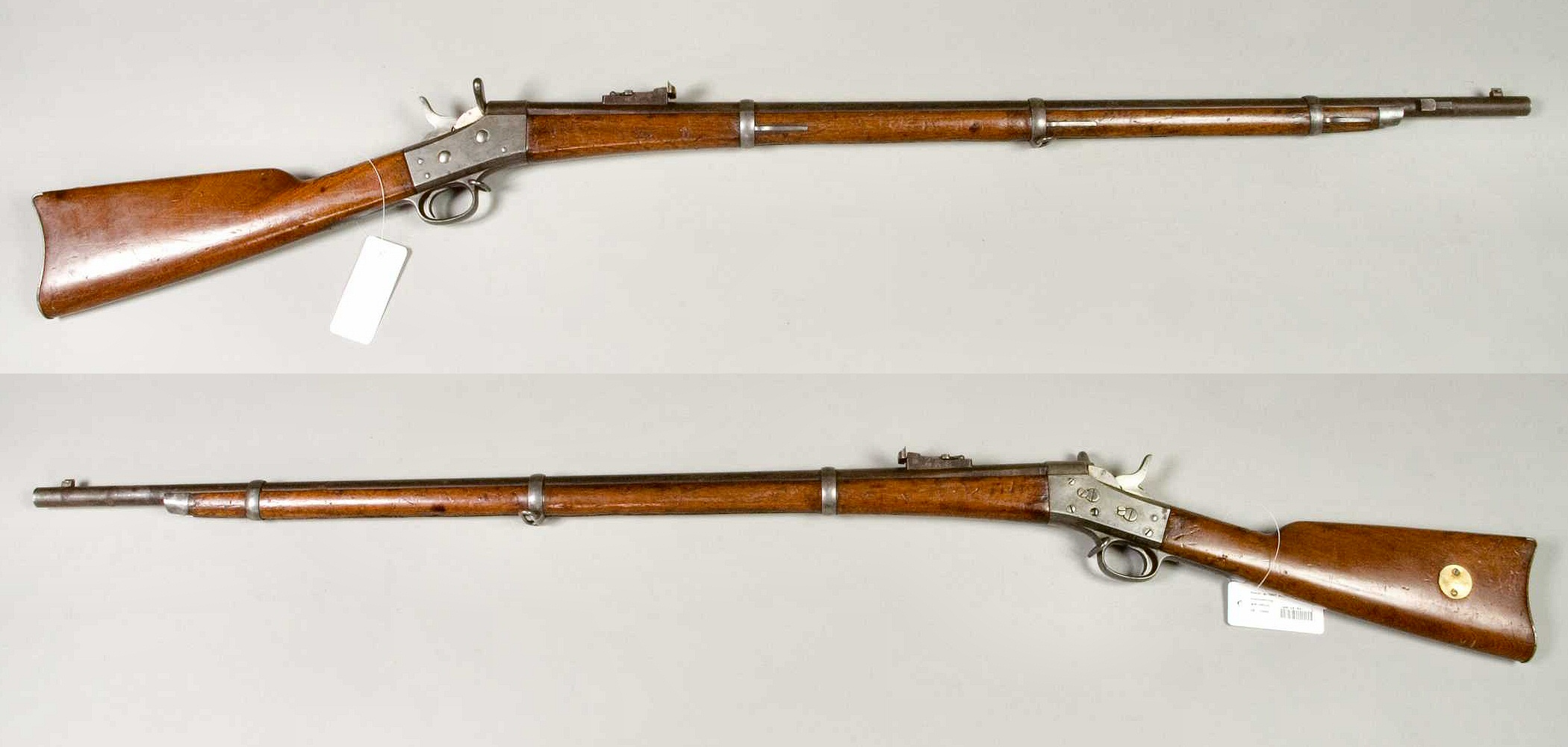
Swedish rifle m/1867, made by Carl Gustafs Stads Gevärsfaktori

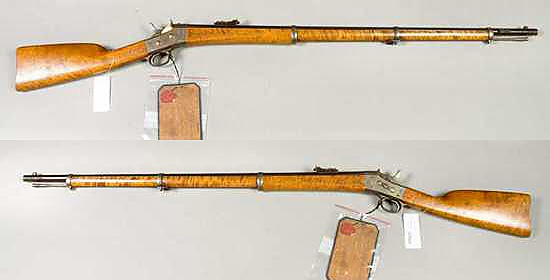
Swedish rifle m/1867-74, introducing a new more comfortable buttstock

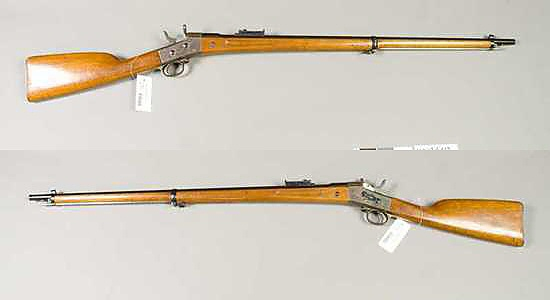
Swedish rifle m/1867-89 in 8×58mmR Danish Krag centerfire

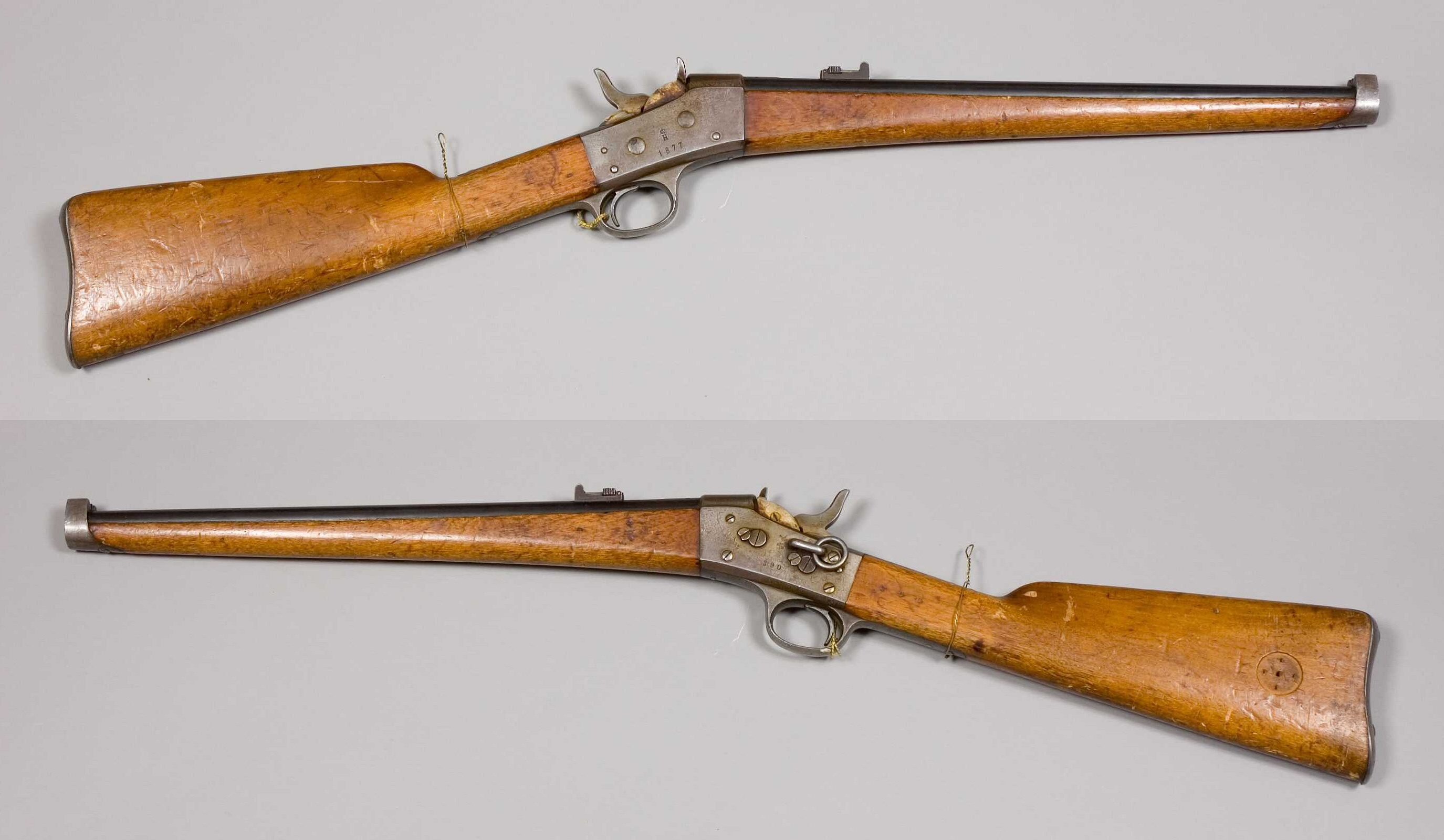
Swedish cavalry carbine m/1870

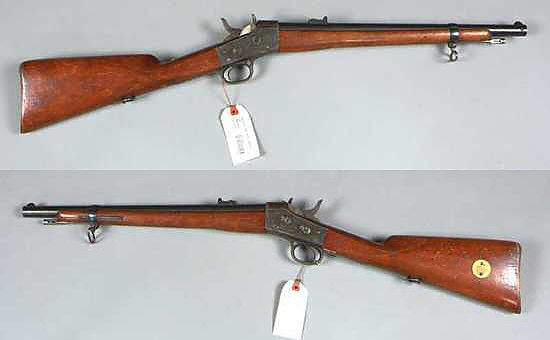
Swedish carbine m/1864-68-85 for artillery, train and others

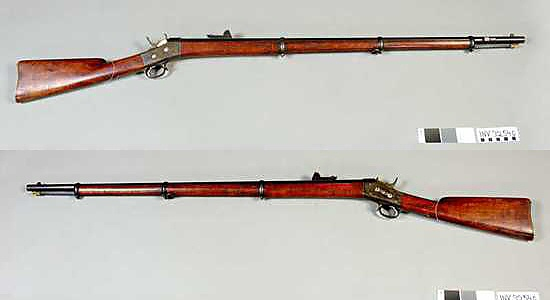
Norwegian rifle M1867, made by Kongsberg Vaapenfabrik

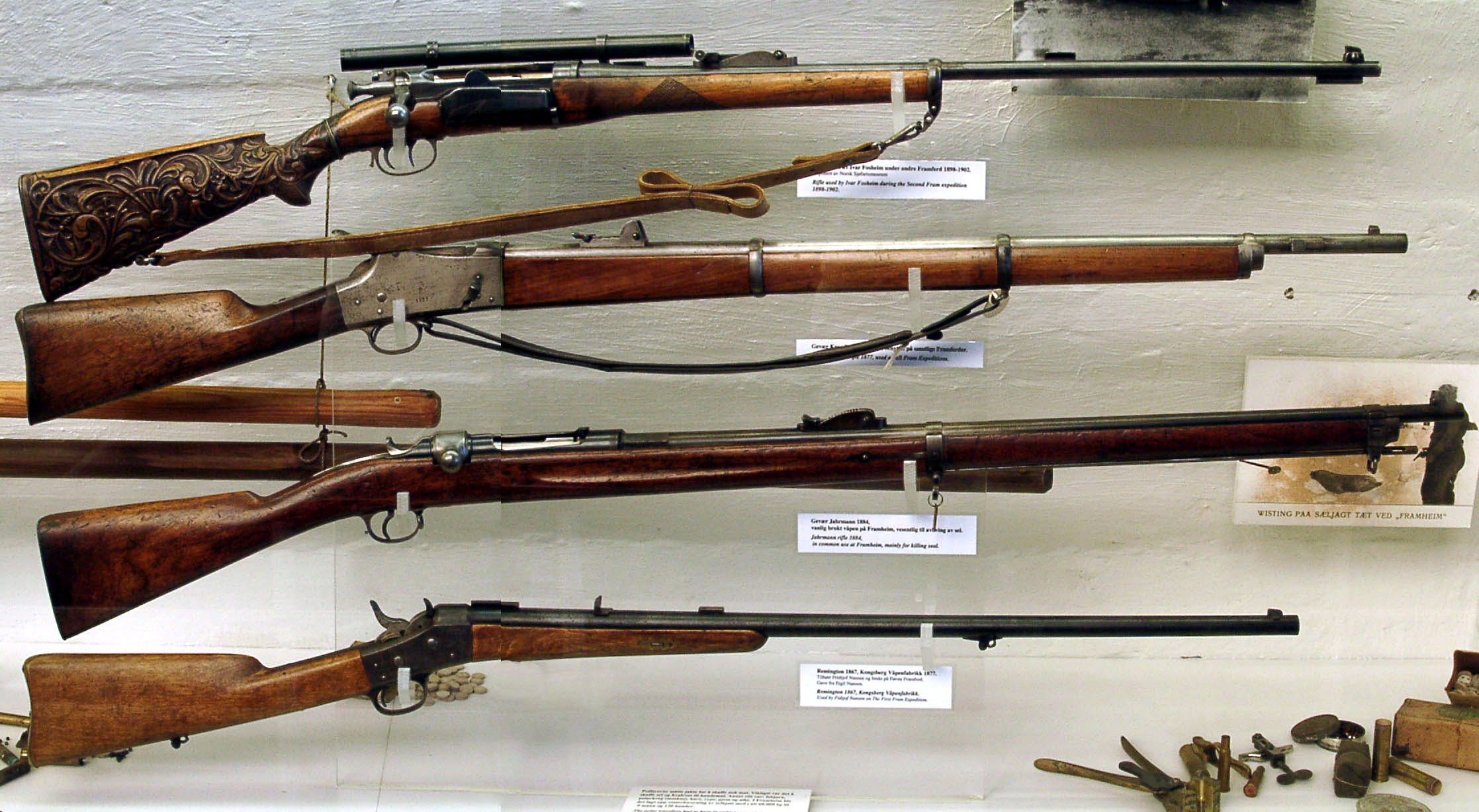
A collection of rifles from the Fram Museum, a Remington M1867 at the bottom

== See also ==
- Remington Rolling Block rifle
- Springfield Model 1870, as used by the United States Navy, produced by Springfield Armory under license.
- Springfield Model 1871, as used by the United States Army, produced by Springfield Armory under license.
