= Jarmann M1884 =

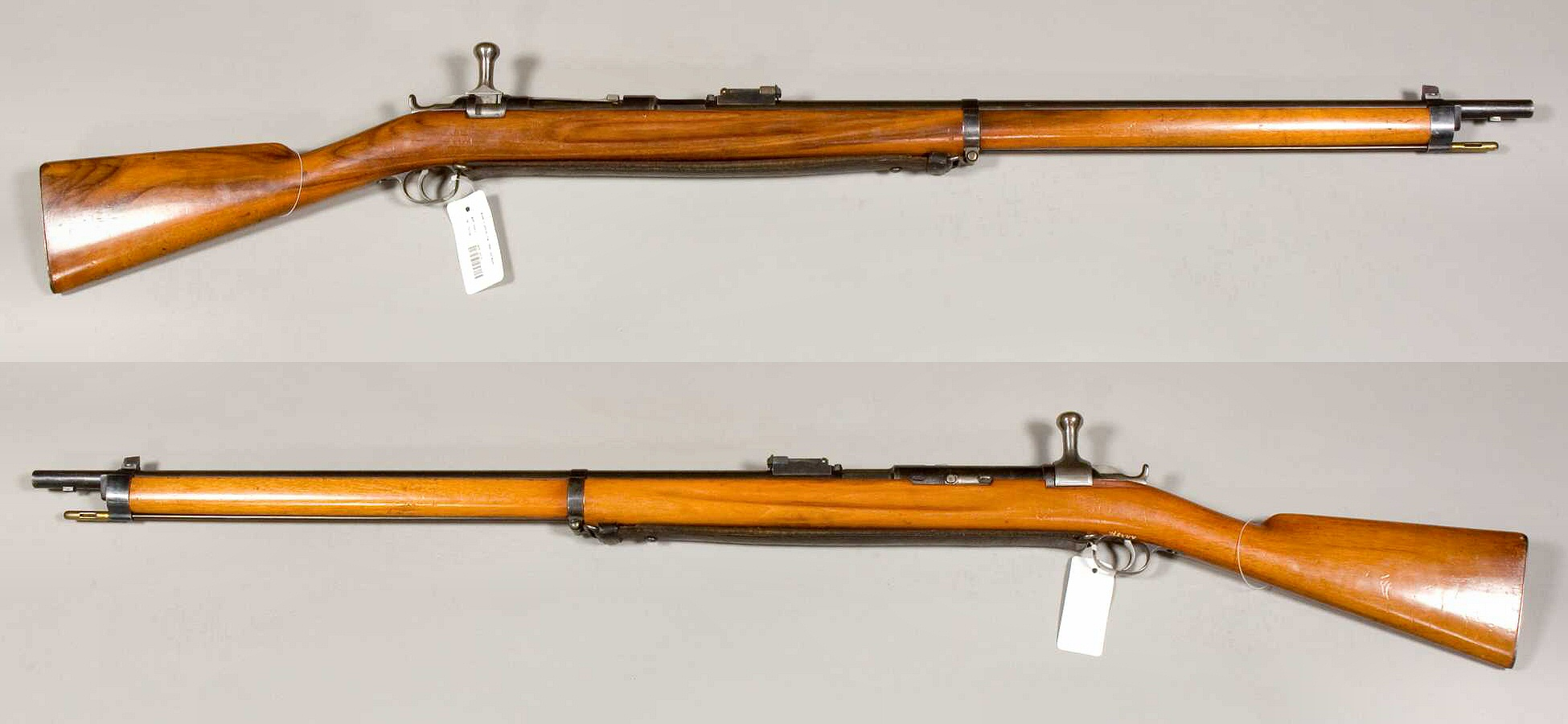
- M1884 Jarmann repeating rifle
- Type: Bolt action Repeating rifle
- Place of origin: Norway

Service history
- In service: 1884 to 1900 (reissued to second line units in 1905)

Production history
- Designer: Jacob Smith Jarmann
- Designed: 1878
- No. built: 31,500
- Variants: Swedish Jarmann (three bands); Norwegian Jarmann (two bands)

Specifications
- Mass: 4.5 kg (10 lb)
- Length: Unknown
- Barrel length: 850 mm (33.5 in)
- Cartridge: 10.15×61mmR
- Action: Bolt action
- Rate of fire: Unknown, but as fast as the operator could operate the action
- Muzzle velocity: 485 to 500 m/s (1,191 to 1,640 ft/s)
- Effective firing range: 430 metres (470 yd) (with iron sight)
- Maximum firing range: 2,400 metres (2,600 yd) (10.15 x 61R rimmed)
- Feed system: 8-round fixed tubular magazine
- Sights: V-notch and front post

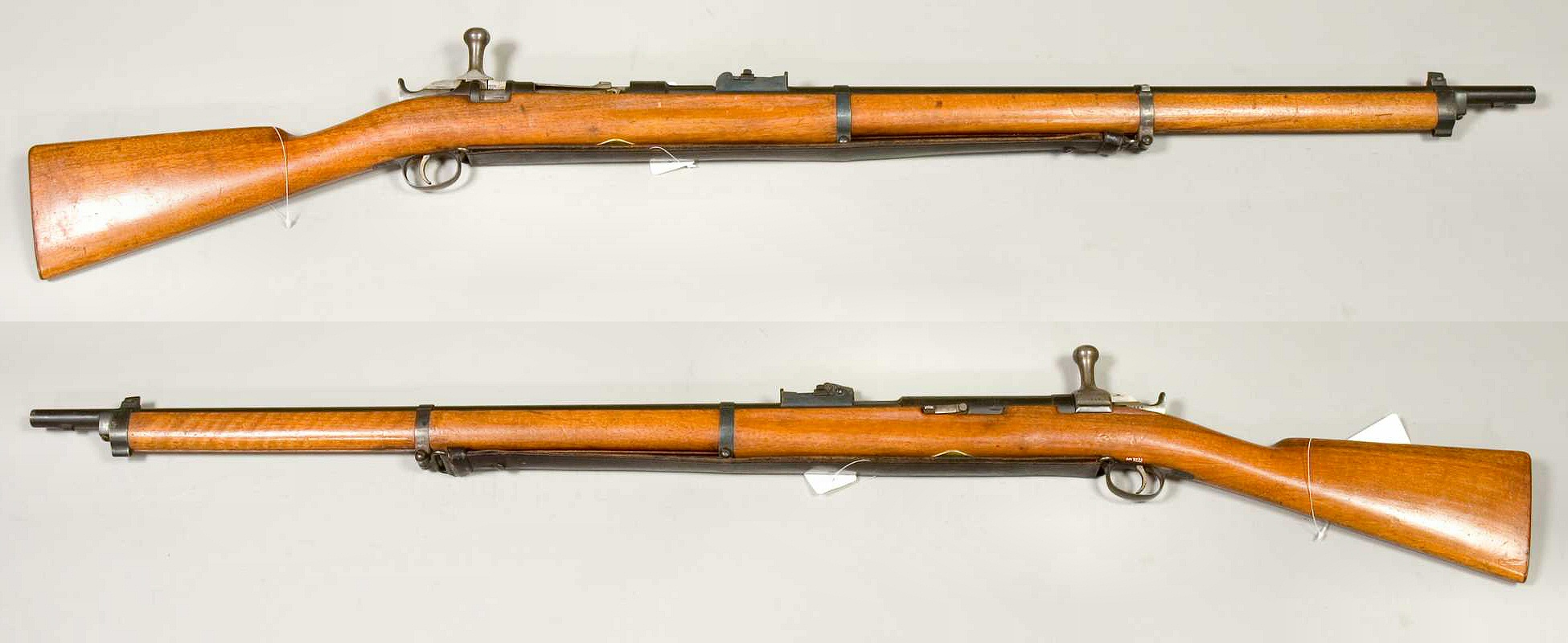
"Three-band" Swedish Jarmann. Apart from the number of bands around the forestock it was identical to the two-band model adopted by Norway as the M1884.

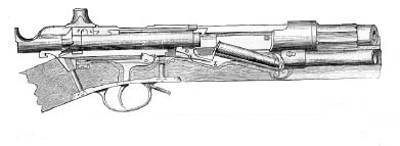
Cross section of action

The Jarmann M1884 is a Norwegian bolt-action repeating rifle designed in 1878 adopted in 1884. The Jarmann's adoption, and subsequent modifications, turned the Norwegian Army from a fighting force armed with single-shot black-powder weapons into a force armed with modern repeating weapons firing smokeless ammunition. Several thousand were manufactured to equip the Norwegian Armed Forces in the 1880s, and it also saw some, though very limited, use in Sweden. The design is unique, and was the brainchild of Norwegian engineer Jacob Smith Jarmann. After the design had been phased out of the Norwegian Army, a number of the weapons were rebuilt as harpoon guns.

== Description ==
The Jarmann M1884 fired a 10.15 mm black powder cartridge in an 8-round, tubular magazine in which the rounds were lined up in a tube below the barrel. It has a non-rotating bolt (the part of the action that seals the rear end of the barrel) locked by a rotating bolt handle, and reputedly a smooth action. However, this action is not considered strong enough to fire modern ammunition, since the only locking is provided by the rotating bolt handle.

Jacob Smith Jarmann designed his first breech-loading rifle—firing cardboard cartridges—in 1838, but this was turned down by the armed forces at the time. The logic was that a rifle capable of firing 13 shots a minute would be impossible to resupply with enough ammunition. In the 1870s, he stepped down from the daily running of his workshop to work on his newly invented bolt-action rifle. According to the patent, three particulars were considered new and unique with the action he had developed:

- The extractor, which not only pulled the spent round out of the breech, but also served to limit the bolt's rearward motion.
- The design of the rotating bolt handle, which served to lock the bolt to the receiver in the forward position.
- The way the extractor was secured to the body of the bolt.

Another interesting oddity is that the Jarmann action does not have a separate ejector, but instead relies on the fact that the extractor pushes the spent round down onto the elevator. The resulting friction was enough to safely eject the round from the receiver.

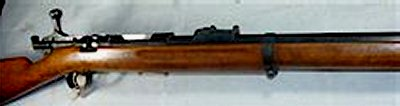
A Jarmann M1884 manufactured in Sweden

The design was first tested by a joint Norwegian-Swedish rifle commission. Their first tests were favorable but highlighted the desirability of a repeating weapon, that is, a weapon with a magazine. Several magazine-fed prototype rifles were built—Ole Herman Johannes Krag, the designer of the Krag–Petersson and the Krag–Jørgensen repeating rifles, designed two different magazines for the Jarmann rifle: one virtually identical to the magazine used on the Krag–Petersson, one which was the forerunner for the magazine he used on the Krag–Jørgensen. Jacob Smith Jarmann himself also made several prototypes, mainly with tubular magazines under the barrel or detachable magazines mounted sideways over the bolt. The latter was considered unusable in the field, and in the end a tubular magazine was selected for the weapon. The magazine is similar to the Kropatschek tubular magazine and may have been inspired by it, although it is just as possible that the magazine is inspired by the Krag–Petersson magazine.

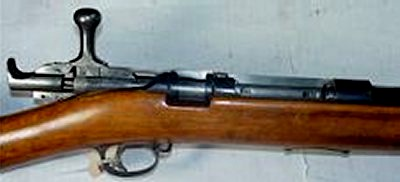
Closeup of the bolt and receiver of the Jarmann pictured above

Despite being a trailblazer with its then-pioneering design, the Jarmann M1884 cannot be considered successful. The combination of tubular magazine and centerfire ammunition has been referred to as "too excitable", especially when used with pointed bullets. Also, the balance of the weapon changed with every shot fired. However, both of these issues are common to all firearms that use tubular magazines.

The first Jarmann design was firmly a single-shot weapon, and Jacob Smith Jarmann was reportedly at first unwilling to design a magazine for it. This may explain why the magazine and bolt do not always work well together.

The sights on the Jarmann M1884, as first issued, were graduated from 200 m to 1600 m. There was an additional sidemounted volley sight, intended for indirect volley fire over long distances, from 1600 m to 2400 m. To be effective, an entire company would have to fire at the same time, which would ensure that at least some of the bullets found their targets. During production, the sights were modified, and M1884s with serial numbers higher than 4330 also had a battle sight fitted to the backside of the sight leaf, which could be revealed by folding the leaf fully forward. The battle sight was set to a fixed range of about 430 m (470 yd), close to the maximum point-blank range of the weapon.

During testing to determine the correct graduation of the sights the rifle commission used improved ammunition, which increased the muzzle velocity to about 485 to 500 m/s.

== Ammunition ==
The aforementioned Norwegian-Swedish commission also designed the 10.15 x 61R cartridge that the various prototypes as well as the service weapon were chambered for. Originally a black-powder round with a paper-wrapped lead bullet, it was later loaded with smokeless powder and a full metal jacket bullet. More than 5 million cartridges were manufactured for the M1884, in addition to several thousand specialty cartridges. The following different variations on the 10.15 x 61R cartridge have been identified:

- 10.15 Ball, rounded tip, lead bullet wrapped in paper, black powder (possibly testing-only round)
- 10.15 Ball, flat tip, lead bullet wrapped in paper, black powder
- 10.15 Ball, flat tip, full metal jacket, smokeless powder
- 10.15 Gallery, round lead bullet (for use indoors or at short ranges)
- 10.15 Gallery, same as above but with a ring crimped around the neck of the case
- 10.15 Blank, unpainted wooden 'bullet', smooth case
- 10.15 Blank, same as above but with six long ridges pressed into the case
- 10.15 Blank, same as above but with six long and six short ridges pressed into the case
- 10.15 Dummy, red wooden 'bullet' going all the way to the bottom of the case, six long and six short ridges pressed into the case, and two rings crimped around the neck of the case
- 10.15 Dummy, as above but with just the six long ridges and rings around the neck
- 10.15 Dummy, as above but with brown wooden 'bullet' and two rings crimped around the neck of the case (tests only).
- 10.15 Harpoon round, a blank round crimped shut, used only in the M28 harpoon gun
- 10.15 Harpoon round, as above but closed with a crimped lid

== Accuracy ==
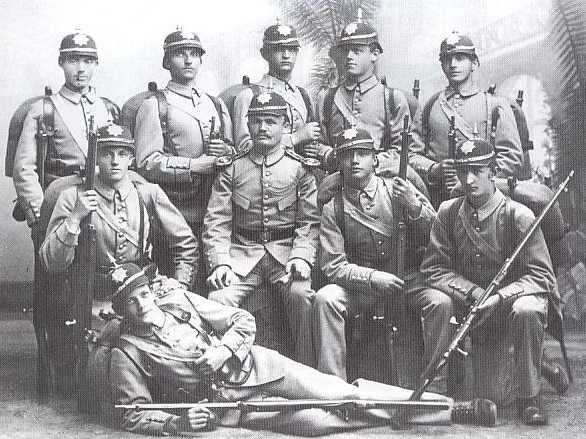
Group of Norwegian soldiers armed with the Jarmann M1884. Uniforms suggest photograph dates from the late 1880s.

The Jarmann rifle was a remarkably accurate rifle for its time. In 1886, the joint Norwegian-Swedish rifle commission, which had selected the Jarmann, created a list of the ballistic properties of all the rifles tested. It is clear from the list, reproduced below, that the Jarmann M1884 was significantly better than the other rifles tested, although in part this must be due to the higher muzzle velocity of the Jarmann.

The rifle commission found that the Jarmann with its 10.15 mm bullet had a maximum point-blank range of 438 metres (479 yd) with a 1.8 m (6 ft) target. At a range of 600 metres (660 yd) it did not spread more than 61 cm (24 in) with uncoated lead bullets and 46 cm (18 in) with jacketed bullets. This compared very favorably to the Remington M1867, then the Norwegian standard weapon, with maximum point-blank range of 300 m (330 yd) and spread at 600 m of 96 cm (38 in).

In comparison, the Gras rifle displayed a spread of 89 cm (35 in) and the Mauser rifle (presumably a Gewehr 71) had a spread of 80 cm (31.5 in), both at 600 m (660 yd).

== Service ==
Despite the problems with the weapon, no fewer than 30,000 were manufactured for the Norwegian armed forces in the decade between its adoption in 1884 and the later adoption of the Krag–Jørgensen in 1894. A further 1500 were manufactured for the Swedish Navy in the same period. In Norwegian service, it replaced the Remington M1867 and the last few kammerladers still in use.

When the weapon was chosen and first issued, the military considered it a very good weapon. It had a good rate of fire and had less than half the spread of the Remington M1867 at 600 m (46 versus 96 cm). It was later eclipsed, however by the radical development of firearms at the time. Within a decade it was phased out and replaced by the Krag–Jørgensen rifle. Even though it was phased out, several second-line units were issued the weapon in 1905, when war between Norway and Sweden was considered imminent.

Towards the end of their use in the armed forces, the original black powder cartridges were replaced by cartridges filled with smokeless powder. Despite the increase in muzzle velocity, the sights were not altered, thus radically decreasing the accuracy of the rifle.

== Fate of the Jarmanns ==
Jarmann M1884s in their original condition are now extremely rare. During the 1920s and 1930s, a number of the surplus rifles was either sold to civilians or rebuilt into M28 harpoon guns.

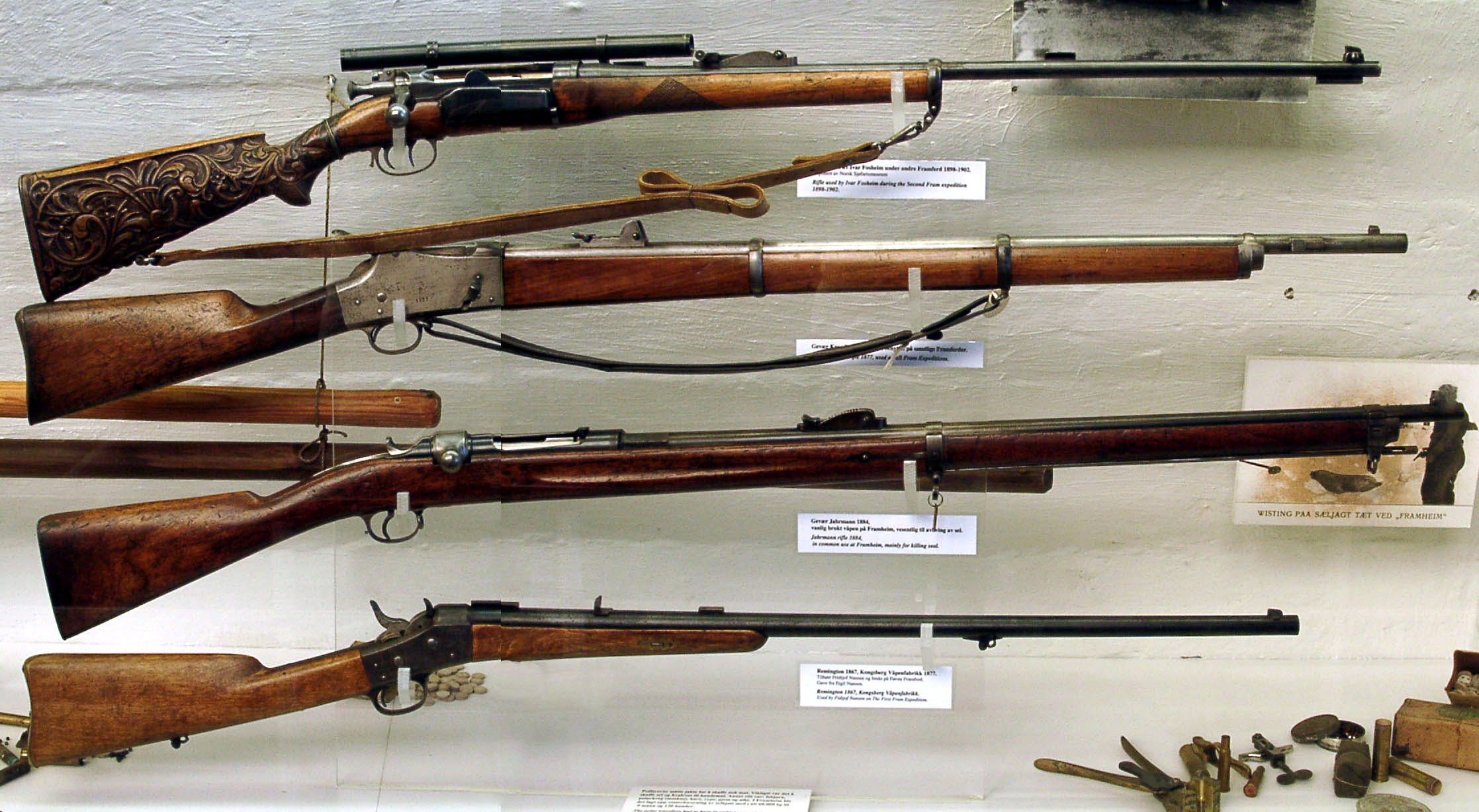
A collection of rifles from the Fram Museum, a Jarmann M1884 second from the bottom.

From the mid-1920s and until the German invasion of Norway, it was possible for civilians to buy surplus Jarmann rifles for about a quarter of what a brand-new Krag–Jørgensen would cost. Despite the reasonable price, it appears that very few were sold. Attempts were also made to sell the rifles and ammunition abroad. In 1929, about 5000 rifles were sold to a German firm, but the fate of these Jarmanns is unknown. In 1936 King Ibn Saud from Saudi Arabia initiated talks to buy 20,000 Jarmanns with ammunition for his police force, but the request was turned down by the Norwegian parliament, who claimed that the sale of such outdated weapons would reflect badly upon Norway. In 1938 a private investor — Trygve G. Hygen, a former captain in the Norwegian Army — caused a minor international incident when he offered to sell Jarmann rifles to Ceylon. The British Consulate General complained to the Norwegian government, pointing out that Ceylon was British and they wanted full control of all weapons sold there. The Norwegian government reprimanded Hygen, and the offer was withdrawn. Attempts were also made by Hygen to sell Jarmanns to Lithuania, Cuba, Nicaragua, Bulgaria, Italy and the Netherlands, but without any takers.

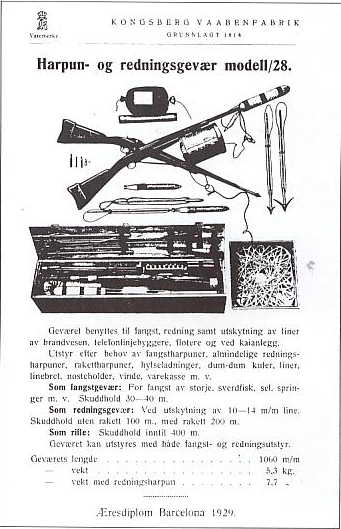
A 1930 advertisement for the M28

Some reports indicate that the Germans melted a significant number down the last remaining Jarmann rifles in military warehouses during the Nazi occupation. The Germans still gave the rifle a designation, despite being considered too obsolete for their use, the Jarmann M1884 received the designation Gewehr 351(n).

== M28 Harpoon gun ==
Between the wars, several Norwegian gunsmiths attempted to create harpoon guns, intended for hunting seals and shooting rescue lines to boats in distress. Seeing a ready market, and having access to the several thousand Jarmanns in storage, Kongsberg Våpenfabrikk designed a harpoon gun referred to as the M28.

== Comparison with contemporary rifles ==
The Jarmann was, at the time of its adoption, considered a good weapon. By comparing it to the Remington M1867, which was the standard-issue rifle in the Norwegian Army, as well as against the standard service rifles of Germany, France and the United Kingdom at the time it is clear that the Jarmann indeed was an excellent weapon for its time, particularly in its accuracy and range.

| Rifle | Jarmann M1884 | Remington M1867 | Mauser Gewehr 71/84 | Gras rifle | Martini–Henry |
| Accuracy at 600 m | 46 cm (18.1 in) | 96 cm (37.8 in) | 80 cm (31 in) | 89 cm (35 in) | 69.5 cm at 1,100 m |
| Maximum point-blank range | 438 m (1,437 ft) | 300 m (984 ft) | 350 m (1,150 ft) | 379 m (1,243 ft) | 346 m (1,135 ft) |
| Effective range | 2,400 m (2,620 yd) | 900 m (980 yd) | Unknown | Unknown | 1,370 m (1,500 yd) |
| Rate of fire | Unknown | 13 round/min | Unknown | Unknown | 8 to 12 round/min |
| Magazine capacity | 8 | None | 8 | None | None |
| Calibre | 10.15 x 61R | 12.17 x 44 rimfire | 11.15 x 60R | 11 x 59R | .450/577 (11.455 x 65R) |
| Muzzle velocity | 500 m/s (1,640 ft/s) | 386 m/s (1,266 ft/s) | 430 m/s (1,411 ft/s) | 455 m/s (1,493 ft/s) | 416 m/s (1,365 ft/s) |
| Barrel length | 850 mm (33.5 in) | 951 mm (37.4 in) | Unknown | Unknown | 840 mm (33.1 in) |
| Total length | Unknown | 1355 mm (53.3 in) | Unknown | Unknown | 1245 mm (49 in) |
| Loaded weight | 4.5 kg (10 lb) | 4.32 kg (9.52 lb) | Unknown | Unknown | 3.83 kg (8.5 lb) |

Comparison of 1880s rifles
| Calibre | System | Country | Velocity | | | | | Height of trajectory | | | | Ammunition | |
| Calibre | System | Country | Muzzle | 500 yd (460 m) | 1,000 yd (910 m) | 1,500 yd (1,400 m) | 2,000 yd (1,800 m) | 500 yd (460 m) | 1,000 yd (910 m) | 1,500 yd (1,400 m) | 2,000 yd (1,800 m) | Propellant | Bullet |
|---|---|---|---|---|---|---|---|---|---|---|---|---|---|
| .433 in (11.0 mm) | Werndl–Holub rifle | Austria-Hungary | 1,439 ft/s (439 m/s) | 854 ft/s (260 m/s) | 620 ft/s (190 m/s) | 449 ft/s (137 m/s) | 328 ft/s (100 m/s) | 8.252 ft (2.515 m) | 49.41 ft (15.06 m) | 162.6 ft (49.6 m) | 426.0 ft (129.8 m) | 77 gr (5.0 g) | 370 gr (24 g) |
| .45 in (11.43 mm) | Martini–Henry | United Kingdom | 1,315 ft/s (401 m/s) | 869 ft/s (265 m/s) | 664 ft/s (202 m/s) | 508 ft/s (155 m/s) | 389 ft/s (119 m/s) | 9.594 ft (2.924 m) | 47.90 ft (14.60 m) | 147.1 ft (44.8 m) | 357.85 ft (109.07 m) | 85 gr (5.5 g) | 480 gr (31 g) |
| .433 in (11.0 mm) | Fusil Gras mle 1874 | France | 1,489 ft/s (454 m/s) | 878 ft/s (268 m/s) | 643 ft/s (196 m/s) | 471 ft/s (144 m/s) | 348 ft/s (106 m/s) | 7.769 ft (2.368 m) | 46.6 ft (14.2 m) | 151.8 ft (46.3 m) | 389.9 ft (118.8 m) | 80 gr (5.2 g) | 386 gr (25.0 g) |
| .433 in (11.0 mm) | Mauser Model 1871 | Germany | 1,430 ft/s (440 m/s) | 859 ft/s (262 m/s) | 629 ft/s (192 m/s) | 459 ft/s (140 m/s) | 388 ft/s (118 m/s) | 8.249 ft (2.514 m) | 48.68 ft (14.84 m) | 159.2 ft (48.5 m) | 411.1 ft (125.3 m) | 75 gr (4.9 g) | 380 gr (25 g) |
| .408 in (10.4 mm) | M1870 Italian Vetterli | Italy | 1,430 ft/s (440 m/s) | 835 ft/s (255 m/s) | 595 ft/s (181 m/s) | 422 ft/s (129 m/s) | 304 ft/s (93 m/s) | 8.527 ft (2.599 m) | 52.17 ft (15.90 m) | 176.3 ft (53.7 m) | 469.9 ft (143.2 m) | 62 gr (4.0 g) | 310 gr (20 g) |
| .397 in (10.08 mm) | Jarmann M1884 | Norway and Sweden | 1,536 ft/s (468 m/s) | 908 ft/s (277 m/s) | 675 ft/s (206 m/s) | 504 ft/s (154 m/s) | 377 ft/s (115 m/s) | 7.235 ft (2.205 m) | 42.97 ft (13.10 m) | 137.6 ft (41.9 m) | 348.5 ft (106.2 m) | 77 gr (5.0 g) | 337 gr (21.8 g) |
| .42 in (10.67 mm) | Berdan rifle | Russia | 1,444 ft/s (440 m/s) | 873 ft/s (266 m/s) | 645 ft/s (197 m/s) | 476 ft/s (145 m/s) | 353 ft/s (108 m/s) | 7.995 ft (2.437 m) | 47.01 ft (14.33 m) | 151.7 ft (46.2 m) | 388.7 ft (118.5 m) | 77 gr (5.0 g) | 370 gr (24 g) |
| .45 in (11.43 mm) | Springfield model 1884 | United States | 1,301 ft/s (397 m/s) | 875 ft/s (267 m/s) | 676 ft/s (206 m/s) | 523 ft/s (159 m/s) | 404 ft/s (123 m/s) | 8.574 ft (2.613 m) | 46.88 ft (14.29 m) | 142.3 ft (43.4 m) | 343.0 ft (104.5 m) | 70 gr (4.5 g) | 500 gr (32 g) |
| .40 in (10.16 mm) | Enfield-Martini | United Kingdom | 1,570 ft/s (480 m/s) | 947 ft/s (289 m/s) | 719 ft/s (219 m/s) | 553 ft/s (169 m/s) | 424 ft/s (129 m/s) | 6.704 ft (2.043 m) | 39.00 ft (11.89 m) | 122.0 ft (37.2 m) | 298.47 ft (90.97 m) | 85 gr (5.5 g) | 384 gr (24.9 g) |

== See also ==
Other Norwegian rifles:

- Kammerlader
- Remington M1867
- Krag–Petersson
- Krag–Jørgensen

Comparable weapons from the same era:

- The German Mauser Gewehr 71/84 and Gewehr 88
- The French Lebel Model 1886 rifle and its forerunner the Gras rifle
- The British Martini–Henry and Lee–Metford
- The Austrian Kropatschek rifle
- The Japanese 11×60mmR Murata rifle

== Sources and references ==
- Doyon, Keith M1879 & M1881 Jarmann / M1884, M1887 & M1887/90 Jarmann Last retrieved 16 August 2005
- Hanevik, Karl Egil (1998). Norske Militærgeværer etter 1867. Hanevik Våpen. Chapter 3. ISBN 82-993143-1-3.
- Wikbor, Trond. "Jarmanns gevær M1884". Archived from the original on 9 February 2006.
