= 12.17×42mm RF =

Rimfire rifle cartridge

12.17×42mm RF/12.17×44mm RF
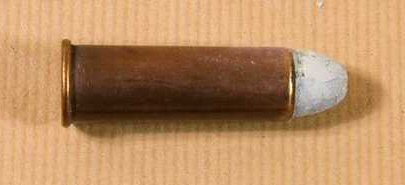
- 12.17×42mm RF (12,17mm patron m/1867) from the collection of Armémuseum, Stockholm
- Type: Rifle
- Place of origin: United Kingdoms of Sweden and Norway

Service history
- Used by: Sweden; Norway

Specifications
- Bullet diameter: .497 inches\12.615 mm
- Neck diameter: 12.17×42mm RF - 13.44 mm 12.17×44mm RF - 13.46 mm
- Base diameter: 12.17×42mm RF - 13.93 mm 12.17×44mm RF - 14.00 mm
- Rim diameter: 12.17×42mm RF - 15.94 mm 12.17×44mm RF - 16.00 mm
- Rim thickness: 12.17×42mm RF - 1.68 mm 12.17×44mm RF - 2.08 mm
- Case length: 12.17×42mm RF - 41.2 mm 12.17×44mm RF - 44 mm
- Overall length: 12.17×42mm RF - 51.78 mm 12.17×44mm RF - 57.38 mm
- Primer type: Rimfire
- Maximum pressure: 89.63–103.42 MPa
- Filling: Black Powder
- Filling weight: In Service; 3.89 or 4.09 Grams

The 12.17×42mm rimfire and its slightly longer but still interchangeable variant, the 12.17×44mm rimfire, are rifle cartridges adopted by the armed forces of Sweden and Norway in 1867 and 1871, respectively. They were primarily chambered in the Remington M1867 rolling block rifle, which became the standard firearm for both countries.

== 12.17×42mm RF and its subvariety the 12.17×44mm RF ==
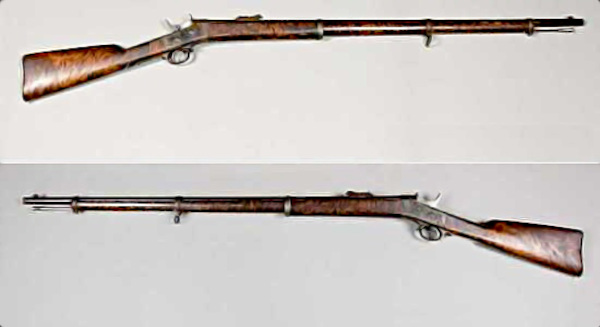
Model 1867 Remington rolling block chambered for the 12.17×42mm RF. The picture is of a "gevär m/1867" manufactured in Sweden. Apart from minor external details M1867 rifles made in Norway were identical to those made in Sweden.

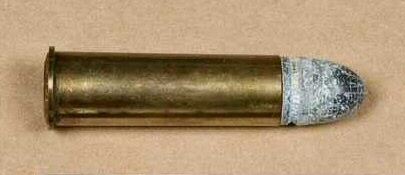
12.17×44mmR, rimmed centerfire cartridge

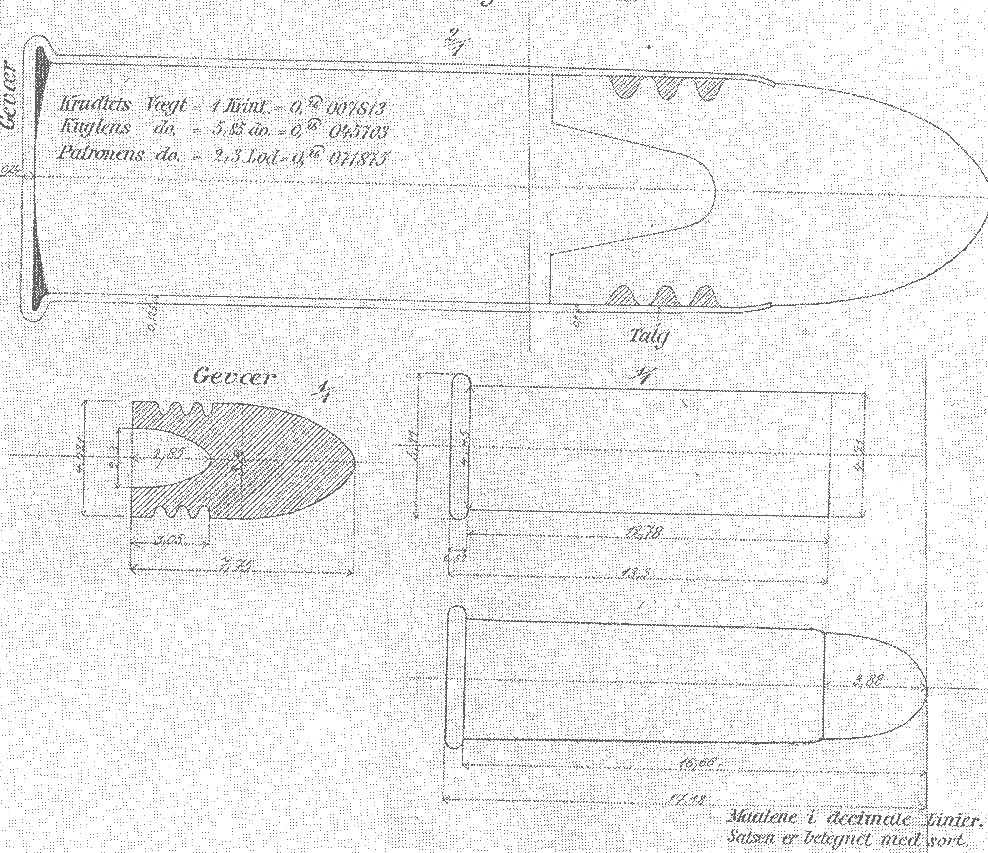
Dimensional drawing of 12.17×44mm RF, Norwegian rimfire military cartridge

The 12.17×42mm RF rimfire round was developed by a joint Swedish-Norwegian arms commission quite likely based on the American .50-70 Government which was already tested in the Remington Rolling Block rifles they were considering, and was adopted by the armed forces of both Sweden and Norway in 1867. It was used in the M1867 Remington rifles adopted as new standard rifles by the armed forces of Sweden and Norway the same year.

Many thousands of older 12-mm rifles, both Swedish muzzle-loading Model 1860 and breech-loading Model 1864 Hagström and Norwegian Kammerlader rifles of various models were also converted to rolling block rifles, chambered for the new standard round.

A lengthened version of the round, the 12.17×44mm RF, was adopted by the Norwegian armed forces in 1871. But the two cartridges were interchangeable, and could thus be fired from the same weapons.

The cartridge, nominally known as 4 Linjers (actual bore diameter 4.1 Swedish decimal lines or 3.88 Norwegian decimal lines, that is 0.41 Swedish or 0.388 Norwegian inches), had a lead bullet 12.615mm (0.497 in) in diameter, with the diameter of the bore, measured between the lands, being 12.17mm (0.479 inches). It used a copper case.

In Swedish service, the standard cartridge used a lead projectile (shaped like a Minié ball) weighing 24 g (370 gr). The muzzle velocity fired through a 955mm (37.6 in) rifle barrel was 386 m/s (1,266 ft/s), with a muzzle energy of 1,788 J (1,319 ft/lbf). Fired through a 460mm (18.11 in) carbine barrel the muzzle velocity was 340 m/s (1,115 ft/s), with a muzzle energy of 1,387 J (1,023 ft/lbf).

In Norwegian service, the standard cartridge used a cast lead projectile weighing 5.85 kvintin (22.8 g/352 gr) and 1 kvintin (3.89 g/60 gr) of gunpowder. Later rounds had a pressed lead projectile weighing 6 kvintin (23.4 g/361 gr) and the gunpowder load was increased to 1.05 kvintin (4.09 g/63 gr).

There was also a blank round - an ordinary cartridge case loaded with 54 gr (3.50 g) of gunpowder and sealed off with a piece of cardboard or a cork disc.

== 12.17×44mmR centerfire ==
A civilian/paramilitary centerfire version of the cartridge, the 12.17×44mmR using a brass cartridge case with the same dimensions as the 12.17×44mm RF, was introduced during the 1870s in both Sweden and Norway. The centerfire cartridge could be fired from both Swedish and Norwegian M1867 military Remington rolling-block firearms with only a minor modification, converting the weapon from rimfire to centerfire and vice versa, which could be done by the shooter in the field provided he or she carried the replacement parts. The advantage of the centerfire cartridge was that spent cases could be reloaded, making centerfire ammunition significantly cheaper to use than rimfire ammunition, so the 12.17×44mmR also saw extensive use in Swedish paramilitary service, being used by Frivilliga Skarpskytterörelsen ("The Volunteer Sharpshooter Movement"), a voluntary paramilitary organization patterned on the British Volunteer Force and training civilians in the use of arms, with the units raised intended as local defense units (the first such volunteer "sharpshooter" units were raised in Stockholm in 1860, with the total number of active members throughout Sweden reaching 40,000 in 1865; volunteer "sharpshooter" units were armed with military M1867 rifles modified to use the 12.17×44mmR centerfire cartridge, and wore military-style uniforms).

== Alternative names ==
The 12.17×42mm RF is also known as "12,17mm patron m/1867" and "12×42RF Swedish Remington Model 1867".
The 12.17×44mm RF is also known as "12×44RF Norwegian Remington Model 1871" and "12.7×44RF Norwegian".
The 12.17×44mm R is also known as "12×44R Swedish Remington", ".50 Swedish/Norwegian Remington" and "12.7×44R".

== Today ==
Many Remington Rolling Blocks were converted to use the centerfire 12.17×44mmR cartridge or rebuilt to shotguns. Many of these guns still exist and are still used by black-powder enthusiasts both for competition and hunting. Centerfire 12.17×44mmR cases are available, but a more cost-effective way to acquire cases is to cut .50 Alaskan cases down to 44mm (1.732 in) total length.

== See also ==
- Remington M1867
- Krag–Petersson
- Kammerlader
