= Crause =

German weapons manufacturer

- Industry: Weapons manufacturing
- Founded: 1815 in Herzberg, Germany
- Founder: Carl Phillip Crause
- Defunct: 1857
- Products: M1835; M1840; M1848; M1849; M1850; M1854

Crause was a weapons manufacturer located in Herzberg, Germany, operating in the first half of the 19th century. Among other orders, they manufactured 2,000 M1849 kammerladers for the Norwegian Army.

== History ==
Crause was founded by its namesake, Carl Phillip Crause. Crause ran a gun manufactory in Herzberg, northwestern Germany, from the end of the Napoleonic Wars until 1857. The factory produced military arms for Hannover and nearby principalities.

The finished weapons manufactured by Crause were signed with his surname and included the Brunswick M1835 and M1848 rifles. In addition, Hannovarian M1850 and M1854 rifle-muskets, yager rifles, and the M1840 and M1849 rifle-muskets were created for the Hanseatic League, which comprised the north German states of Oldenberg, Hamburg, Bremen, and Lubeck. The latter two types of arms were modified to accommodate elongated projectiles that gained popularity in the 1850s. Several thousand of these weapons were also imported into the United States, where they were used during the American Civil War.
