= 10.15×61mmR =

Rifle cartridge

10.15x61mmR
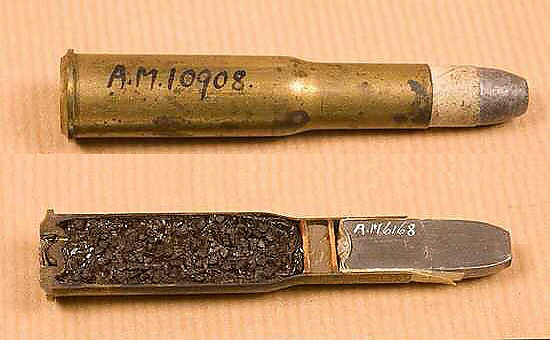
- 10.15x61mmR "Jarmann"
- Type: Rifle
- Place of origin: United Kingdoms of Sweden and Norway

Service history
- In service: 1881 to 1900
- Used by: Norway; Sweden

Specifications
- Case type: Rimmed

The 10.15×61 mmR cartridge was designed by a joint Swedish-Norwegian rifle commission in the late 1870s and early 1880s, and approved for use in Sweden and Norway in 1881. It was primarily used by Norway in the Model 1884 Jarmann rifle, but also saw limited use in Sweden in the m/1867-84 rolling block rifle and carbine ("kammarskjutningsgevär m/1884" and "kammarskjutningskarbin m/1884", which were primarily used for gallery shooting, that is short range training). It is a rimmed, centerfire cartridge, and was initially loaded with black powder and a lead bullet wrapped in paper. Later cartridges were loaded with smokeless powder and had a lead bullet coated in steel (Full metal jacket, or FMJ).

The earliest version had a load of 4.46 g of black powder, and a projectile weighing 21.85 g. This gave a muzzle velocity of 500 m/s. The later version, with a full metal jacket, was loaded to produce the same muzzle velocity.

All in all, more than 3 million cartridges were manufactured for military use in Norway, as well as more than 2 million ordered from abroad. The majority of these were sold with the Jarmann rifles when the Norwegian Army introduced the Krag–Jørgensen.

The following variations on the 10.15x61mmR cartridge have been identified:

- 10.15 Ball, rounded tip, lead bullet wrapped in paper, black powder (possible just used for tests)
- 10.15 mm Ball, flat tip, lead bullet wrapped in paper, black powder
- 10.15 mm Ball, flat tip, full metal jacket, smokeless powder
- 10.15 mm Gallery, round lead bullet (for use indoor / short rangers)
- 10.15 mm Gallery, same as above but with a ring crimped around the neck of the case
- 10.15 mm Blank, unpainted wooden 'bullet', smooth case
- 10.15 mm Blank, same as above but with six long ridges pressed into the case
- 10.15 mm Blank, same as above but with six long and six short ridges pressed into the case
- 10.15 mm Dummy, red wooden 'bullet' going all the way to the bottom of the case, six long and six short ridges pressed into the case and two rings crimped around the neck of the case.
- 10.15 mm Dummy, as above but with just the six long ridges and rings around the neck.
- 10.15 mm Dummy, as above but with brown wooden 'bullet' and two rings crimped around the neck of the case (tests only).
- 10.15 mm Harpoon round, a blank round crimped shut, used only in the M28 harpoon gun.
- 10.15 mm Harpoon round, as above but closed with a crimped lid.

== Gallery ==
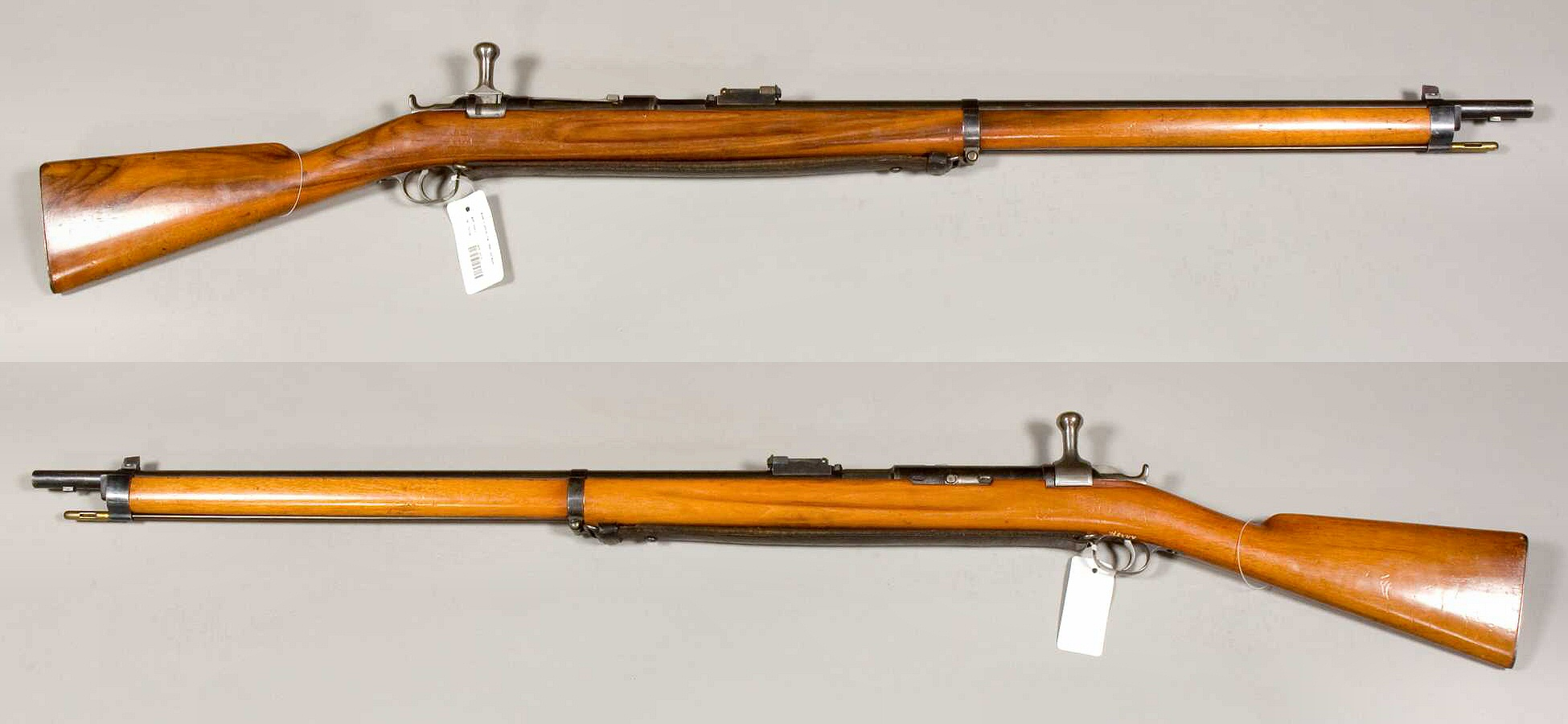
Jarmann repeating rifle fm/1881 in 10.15x61mmR. This "two-band" model became the Norwegian M1884 Jarmann. Made by Carl Gustafs Stads Gevärsfaktori in Sweden.

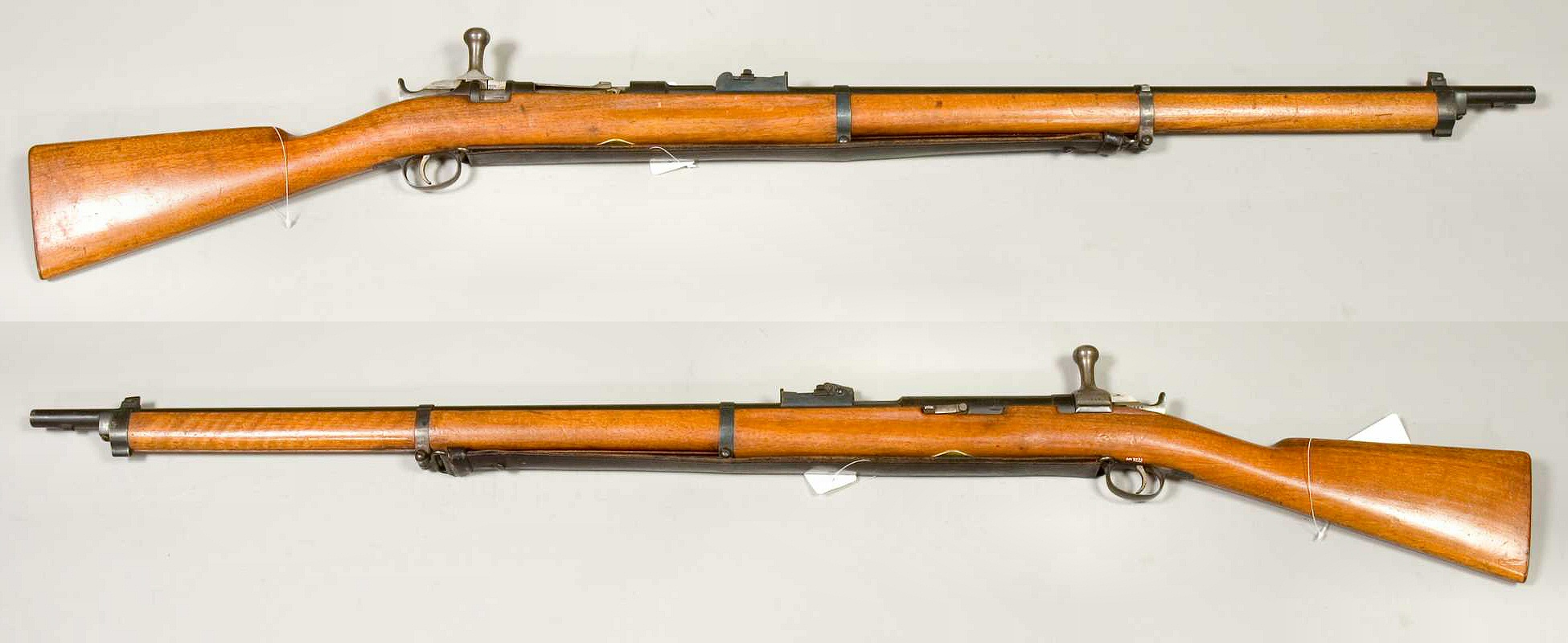
A Carl Gustaf made "three-band" fm/1881, also in 10.15x61mmR. Apart from the number of bands around the forestock it is identical to the "two-band" model.

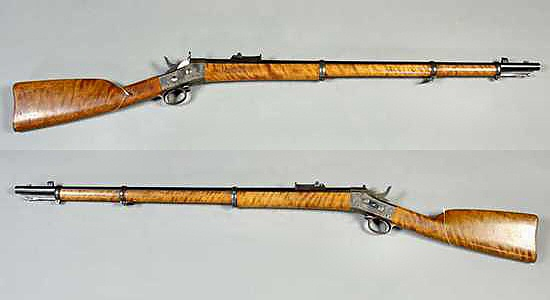
Swedish Remington rolling block rifle "kammarskjutningsgevär m/1884" in 10.15x61mmR.

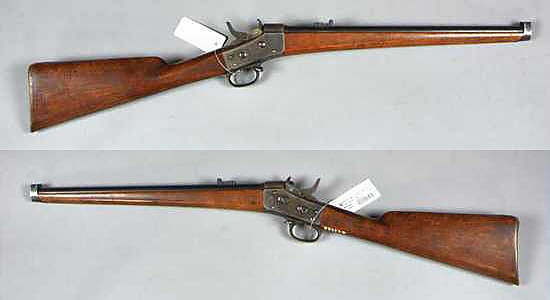
Swedish Remington rolling block carbine "kammarskjutningskarbin m/1884" in 10.15x61mmR.

== See also ==
- List of rimmed cartridges
