= Circular =

Circular may refer to:

- The shape of a circle
- Circular (album), a 2006 album by Spanish singer Vega
- Circular letter (disambiguation), a document addressed to many destinations
  - Circulaire
- Circular reasoning, a type of logical fallacy
- Circular reference
- Circular Quay, Australia
- Circular Park, Armenia

== See also ==
- Circular DNA (disambiguation)
- Circular Line (disambiguation)
- Circularity (disambiguation)
