= Provinces of Thailand =

First-level administrative subdivision of Thailand

- Also known as: changwat (จังหวัด)
- Category: Unitary state
- Location: Kingdom of Thailand
- Number: 76 provinces + 1 special administrative area (Bangkok)
- Populations: 187,000 (Samut Songkhram) – 5,456,000 (Bangkok) (2024)
- Areas: 414 km^{2} (160 sq mi) Samut Songkhram – 22,311 km^{2} (8,614 sq mi) Chiang Mai
- Government: Provincial government Provincial Administrative Organization (Local) Special local authority organisation (Bangkok)
- Subdivisions: Districts

The provinces of Thailand are administrative divisions of the government of Thailand. The country is divided into 76 provinces (Thai: จังหวัด, RTGS: changwat, pronounced [tɕāŋ.wàt]) proper, with one additional special administrative area (the capital, Bangkok). They are the primary local government units and act as juristic persons. They are divided into amphoe (districts) which are further divided into tambon (sub districts), the next lower level of local government.

All provinces form part of the partially devolved central government, or the regional government (ราชการส่วนภูมิภาค ratchakan suan phumiphak). Majority of public services, including police, prison, transport, public relation and others are still overseen and managed by the province on behalf of the central government. In 1938–1996, the Royal Thai Government proposed that each province should have a council, elected from people resided within that province. The council acts as an advisory and auditing body to the governor (ผู้ว่าราชการจังหวัด phu wa ratchakan changwat), who is appointed by the central government. In 1997, each province has its own provincial administrative organization (องค์การบริหารส่วนจังหวัด ongkan borihan suan changwat), presided over by the president. The PAO manages some public services related to the province. It was expected that the PAO president will become the elected governor (instead of a centrally-appointed one), but the full devolution of the government has not happened. The PAO as well as other municipalities form part of the local self-governing government (ราชการส่วนท้องถิ่น ratchakan suan thongthin).

Bangkok, the sole special administrative area, combines the tasks of the provinces with that of a municipality, including having an elected governor. The average area of the 76 provinces of Thailand plus Bangkok is about 6,663.89 km^{2} (2,572.94 sq mi), while its average population of all 77 divisions of Thailand is about 908,064 people.

== 76 provinces in Thailand ==
A clickable map of Thailand exhibiting its provinces

A clickable map of Thailand exhibiting its provinces

Seal	Name	Name (in Thai)	Population (December 2024)	Area (km^{2})	Population density	Capital	HS	ISO	FIPS
	Bangkok (special administrative area)	กรุงเทพมหานคร	5,456,000	1,564	3,488	Bangkok	BKK	TH-10	TH40
	Amnat Charoen	อำนาจเจริญ	372,000	3,290	113	Amnat Charoen	ACR	TH-37	TH77
	Ang Thong	อ่างทอง	269,000	950	283	Ang Thong	ATG	TH-15	TH35
	Bueng Kan	บึงกาฬ	419,000	4,003	105	Bueng Kan	BKN	TH-38	TH81
	Buriram	บุรีรัมย์	1,566,000	10,080	155	Buriram	BRM	TH-31	TH28
	Chachoengsao	ฉะเชิงเทรา	733,000	5,169	142	Chachoengsao	CCO	TH-24	TH44
	Chai Nat	ชัยนาท	314,000	2,506	131	Chai Nat	CNT	TH-18	TH32
	Chaiyaphum	ชัยภูมิ	1,106,000	12,698	88	Chaiyaphum	CPM	TH-36	TH26
	Chanthaburi	จันทบุรี	536,000	6,415	83	Chanthaburi	CTI	TH-22	TH48
	Chiang Mai	เชียงใหม่	1,799,000	22,311	79	Chiang Mai	CMI	TH-50	TH02
	Chiang Rai	เชียงราย	1,298,000	11,503	112	Chiang Rai	CRI	TH-57	TH03
	Chonburi	ชลบุรี	1,636,000	4,508	363	Chonburi	CBI	TH-20	TH46
	Chumphon	ชุมพร	508,000	5,998	84	Chumphon	CPN	TH-86	TH58
	Kalasin	กาฬสินธุ์	962,000	6,936	139	Kalasin	KSN	TH-46	TH23
	Kamphaeng Phet	กำแพงเพชร	701,000	8,512	82	Kamphaeng Phet	KPT	TH-62	TH11
	Kanchanaburi	กาญจนบุรี	896,000	19,385	46	Kanchanaburi	KRI	TH-71	TH50
	Khon Kaen	ขอนแก่น	1,772,000	10,659	166	Khon Kaen	KKN	TH-40	TH22
	Krabi	กระบี่	484,000	5,323	91	Krabi	KBI	TH-81	TH63
	Lampang	ลำปาง	704,000	12,488	56	Lampang	LPG	TH-52	TH06
	Lamphun	ลำพูน	397,000	4,478	89	Lamphun	LPN	TH-51	TH05
	Loei	เลย	632,000	10,500	60	Loei	LEI	TH-42	TH18
	Lopburi	ลพบุรี	725,000	6,493	111	Lopburi	LRI	TH-16	TH34
	Mae Hong Son	แม่ฮ่องสอน	288,000	12,765	23	Mae Hong Son	MSN	TH-58	TH01
	Maha Sarakham	มหาสารคาม	930,000	5,607	165	Maha Sarakham	MKM	TH-44	TH24
	Mukdahan	มุกดาหาร	351,000	4,126	85	Mukdahan	MDH	TH-49	TH78
	Nakhon Nayok	นครนายก	260,000	2,141	121	Nakhon Nayok	NYK	TH-26	TH43
	Nakhon Pathom	นครปฐม	926,000	2,142	432	Mueang Nakhon Pathom	NPT	TH-73	TH53
	Nakhon Phanom	นครพนม	711,000	5,637	125	Nakhon Phanom	NPM	TH-48	TH73
	Nakhon Ratchasima	นครราชสีมา	2,620,000	20,736	126	Nakhon Ratchasima	NMA	TH-30	TH27
	Nakhon Sawan	นครสวรรค์	1,014,000	9,526	106	Nakhon Sawan	NSN	TH-60	TH16
	Nakhon Si Thammarat	นครศรีธรรมราช	1,535,000	9,885	154	Nakhon Si Thammarat	NRT	TH-80	TH64
	Nan	น่าน	471,000	12,130	39	Nan	NAN	TH-55	TH04
	Narathiwat	นราธิวาส	824,000	4,491	183	Narathiwat	NWT	TH-96	TH31
	Nong Bua Lamphu	หนองบัวลำภู	504,000	4,099	123	Nong Bua Lam Phu	NBP	TH-39	TH79
	Nong Khai	หนองคาย	512,000	3,275	156	Nong Khai	NKI	TH-43	TH17
	Nonthaburi	นนทบุรี	1,318,000	637	2,069	Nonthaburi	NBI	TH-12	TH38
	Pathum Thani	ปทุมธานี	1,236,000	1,520	813	Pathum Thani	PTE	TH-13	TH39
	Pattani	ปัตตานี	741,000	1,977	375	Pattani	PTN	TH-94	TH69
	Phang Nga	พังงา	266,000	5,495	49	Phang Nga	PNA	TH-82	TH61
	Phatthalung	พัทลุง	519,000	3,861	135	Phatthalung	PLG	TH-93	TH66
	Phayao	พะเยา	455,000	6,189	74	Phayao	PYO	TH-56	TH41
	Phetchabun	เพชรบูรณ์	961,000	12,340	75	Phetchabun	PNB	TH-67	TH14
	Phetchaburi	เพชรบุรี	484,100	6,172	76	Phetchaburi	PBI	TH-76	TH56
	Phichit	พิจิตร	517,000	4,319	120	Phichit	PCT	TH-66	TH13
	Phitsanulok	พิษณุโลก	839,000	10,589	78	Phitsanulok	PLK	TH-65	TH12
	Phra Nakhon Si Ayutthaya	พระนครศรีอยุธยา	823,000	2,548	323	Ayutthaya	AYA	TH-14	TH36
	Phrae	แพร่	422,000	6,483	65	Phrae	PRE	TH-54	TH07
	Phuket	ภูเก็ต	430,000	547	786	Phuket City	PKT	TH-83	TH62
	Prachinburi	ปราจีนบุรี	501,000	5,026	100	Prachinburi	PRI	TH-25	TH74
	Prachuap Khiri Khan	ประจวบคีรีขันธ์	552,000	6,414	87	Prachuap Khiri Khan	PKN	TH-77	TH57
	Ranong	ระนอง	193,000	3,230	59	Ranong	RNG	TH-85	TH59
	Ratchaburi	ราชบุรี	864,000	5,189	167	Ratchaburi	RBR	TH-70	TH52
	Rayong	ระยอง	782,000	3,666	213	Rayong	RYG	TH-21	TH47
	Roi Et	ร้อยเอ็ด	1,276,000	7,873	162	Roi Et	RET	TH-45	TH25
	Sa Kaeo	สระแก้ว	562,000	6,831	80	Sa Kaeo	SKW	TH-27	TH80
	Sakon Nakhon	สกลนคร	1,138,000	9,580	118	Sakon Nakhon	SNK	TH-47	TH20
	Samut Prakan	สมุทรปราการ	1,381,000	947	1,458	Mueang Samut Prakan	SPK	TH-11	TH42
	Samut Sakhon	สมุทรสาคร	591,000	866	682	Mueang Samut Sakhon	SKN	TH-74	TH55
	Samut Songkhram	สมุทรสงคราม	187,000	414	452	Samut Songkhram	SKM	TH-75	TH54
	Saraburi	สระบุรี	639,000	3,499	182	Saraburi	SRB	TH-19	TH37
	Satun	สตูล	325,000	3,019	108	Satun	STN	TH-91	TH67
	Sing Buri	สิงห์บุรี	200,000	817	245	Sing Buri	SBR	TH-17	TH33
	Sisaket	ศรีสะเกษ	1,442,000	8,936	161	Sisaket	SSK	TH-33	TH30
	Songkhla	สงขลา	1,431,000	7,741	185	Songkhla	SKA	TH-90	TH68
	Sukhothai	สุโขทัย	573,000	6,671	86	Sukhothai Thani	STI	TH-64	TH09
	Suphan Buri	สุพรรณบุรี	822,000	5,410	152	Suphan Buri	SPB	TH-72	TH51
	Surat Thani	สุราษฎร์ธานี	1,077,000	13,079	81	Surat Thani	SRT	TH-84	TH60
	Surin	สุรินทร์	1,360,000	8,854	153	Surin	SRN	TH-32	TH29
	Tak	ตาก	699,000	17,303	40	Tak	TAK	TH-63	TH08
	Trang	ตรัง	635,000	4,726	134	Trang	TRG	TH-92	TH65
	Trat	ตราด	227,000	2,866	77	Trat	TRT	TH-23	TH49
	Ubon Ratchathani	อุบลราชธานี	1,868,000	15,626	119	Mueang Ubon Ratchathani	UBN	TH-34	TH75
	Udon Thani	อุดรธานี	1,552,000	11,072	140	Udon Thani	UDN	TH-41	TH76
	Uthai Thani	อุทัยธานี	320,000	6,647	48	Uthai Thani	UTI	TH-61	TH15
	Uttaradit	อุตรดิตถ์	436,000	7,906	55	Uttaradit	UTD	TH-53	TH10
	Yala	ยะลา	553,000	4,476	124	Yala	YLA	TH-95	TH70
	Yasothon	ยโสธร	525,000	4,131	127	Yasothon	YST	TH-35	TH72

- The total population of Thailand is 65,951,000 as of December 2024.
- The total land area of Thailand is 517,646 km^{2} in 2013.
- The total land area of Chiang Mai province is 22,311 sq.km
- HS – Harmonized Commodity Description and Coding System.
- FIPS code is replaced on 31 December 2014 with ISO 3166.

== Governance ==
Thailand's national government organisation is divided into three types: central government (ministries, bureaus and departments), provincial government (provinces and districts) and local government (Bangkok, Pattaya, provincial administrative organisations, etc.).

A province, as part of the provincial government, is administered by a governor (ผู้ว่าราชการจังหวัด) who is appointed by the Minister of Interior. Bangkok, as part of the local government, is administered by a corporation called Bangkok Metropolitan Administration. The corporation is led by the Governor of Bangkok (ผู้ว่าราชการกรุงเทพมหานคร) who is directly elected by the citizens of Bangkok.

The provinces are named after their original main city, which may not necessarily still be the most populous city within the province today. Also, in several provinces the administration has been moved into a new building outside the city.

== History ==
=== Before 1892 ===
Many provinces date back to semi-independent local chiefdoms or kingdoms, which made up the Ayutthaya Kingdom. The provinces were created around a capital city (mueang) and included surrounding villages or satellite towns. The provinces were administered either by a governor, who was appointed by the king or by a local ruling family, who were descendants of the old kings and princes of that area and had been given this privilege by the central king. De facto the king did not have much choice but to choose someone from the local nobility or an economically strong man, as against these local power groups the administration would have become impossible. The governor was not paid by the king, but instead financed himself and his administration by imposing local taxes himself. Every province was required to send an annual tribute to Bangkok.

The provinces were divided into four different classes. The first-class were the border provinces. The second-class were those that once had their own princely house. Third-class were provinces that were created by splitting them from other provinces. Fourth-class were provinces near the capital. Additionally tributary states like the principalities of Lan Na, the Laotian kingdoms of Vientiane and Luang Prabang, Cambodia, or the Malay sultanate Kedah were also part of the country, but with more autonomy than the provinces. In this Mandala system the semi-independent countries sometimes were tributary to more than one country.

New provinces were created when the population of an area outgrew the administration, but also for political reasons. If a governor became too dominant in a region former satellite cities were elevated to provincial status, as was the case with Maha Sarakham province.

Reforms of the provincial administration started in the 1870s under increased pressure from the colonial states of the United Kingdom and France. Agents were sent, especially to border areas, to impose more control on the provinces or tributary states.

=== Administrative reform of 1892 ===
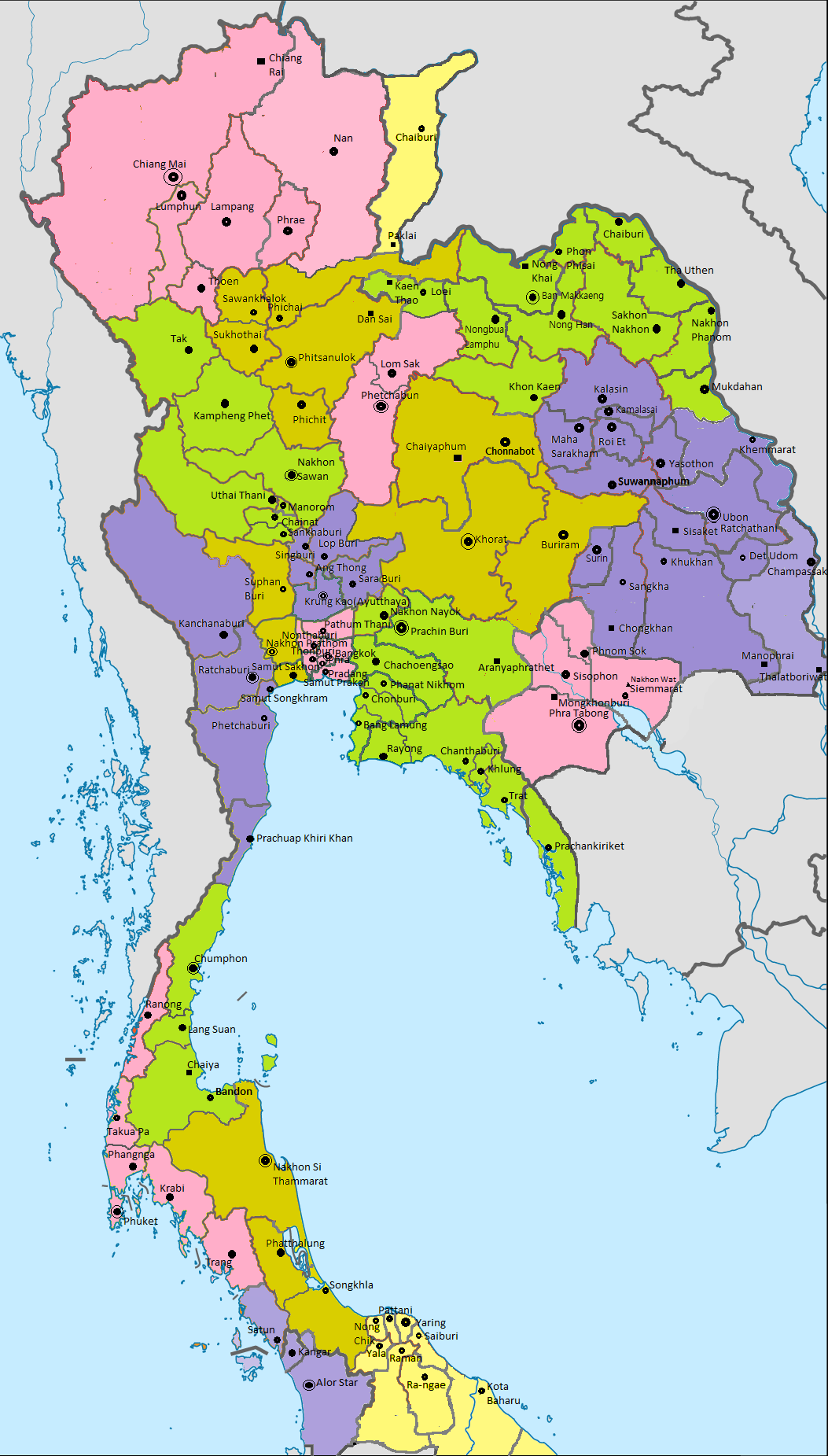
Map of Siam in 1900

At the end of the 19th century King Chulalongkorn reformed the central government. In 1892 the ministry, which previously had many overlapping responsibilities, was reorganized with clear missions as in Western administrations. Prince Damrong Rajanubhab became minister of the Ministry of the North (Mahatthai), originally responsible for the northern administration. When the Ministry of the South (Kalahom) was dissolved in 1894, Prince Damrong became Minister of the Interior, responsible for the provincial administration of the whole country.

Starting in 1893 the already existing commissionaireships in some parts of the country were renamed "superintendent commissioner" (khaluang Thesaphiban), and their area of responsibility was called a monthon. In strategically important areas the monthon were created first, while in other areas the provinces kept their independence a bit longer. Several smaller provinces were reduced in status to an amphoe (district) or even lower to a tambon (sub-district) and included in a neighboring province, sometimes for administrative reasons, but sometimes to remove an uncooperative governor.

In some regions rebellions broke out against the new administrative system, usually induced by the local nobility fearing their loss of power. The most notable was the Holy Man Rebellion in 1902 in Isan. It was initially a messianic doomsday sect, but it also attacked government representatives in the northeast. The provincial town Khemarat was even burned by the rebels. After a few months the rebellion was beaten back.

After 1916, the word changwat became common to use for the provinces, partly to distinguish them from the provincial capital city (mueang or amphoe mueang), but also to stress the new administrative structure of the provinces.

Cities and Monthons in 1900

When Prince Damrong resigned in 1915, the whole country was divided into 19 monthon (including the area around Bangkok, which was under the responsibility of another ministry until 1922), with 72 provinces.

In December 1915 King Vajiravudh announced the creation of regions (phak), each administered by a viceroy (upparat), to cover several monthon. Until 1922 four regions were established; however, in 1925 they were dissolved again. At the same time several monthon were merged, in an attempt to streamline administration and reduce costs.

=== Since 1932 ===
The monthons were dissolved when Thailand transformed from an absolute monarchy into a constitutional monarchy in 1932, making the provinces the top level administrative division again. Several smaller provinces were also abolished at that time. During World War II, several provinces around Bangkok were merged. These changes were undone after the war. Also the occupied area from French Indochina was organized into four provinces: Phra Tabong, Phibunsongkhram, Nakhon Champasak and Lan Chang. The current province of Sukhothai was at first known as Sawankhalok. It was renamed Sukhothai in 1939 (which is why the railway system goes to Sawankhalok city and not Sukhothai city). The province, Kalasin, was reestablished in 1947 after having been dissolved in 1932.

In 1972 Phra Nakhon and Thonburi provinces were merged to form the special administrative area of Bangkok, which combines the tasks of the provinces with that of a municipality, including having an elected governor.

Starting in the second half of the 20th century some provinces were newly created by splitting them off from bigger provinces. In 1975, Yasothon province was split off from Ubon Ratchathani. In 1977, Phayao province was created from districts formerly part of Chiang Rai. In 1982, Mukdahan was split off from Nakhon Phanom. In 1993 three provinces were created: Sa Kaeo (split from Prachinburi), Nong Bua Lamphu province (split from Udon Thani), and Amnat Charoen (split from Ubon Ratchathani). The newest province is Bueng Kan, which was split off from Nong Khai effective 23 March 2011.

== Former provinces and administrative areas ==
=== Former provinces merged into other provinces ===
Province	Capital	Merged in	Fate
Kabin Buri	Kabin Buri	1926	Merged into Prachinburi province
Sukhothai (before 1932)	Sukhothai Thani	1932	Merged into Sawankhalok province. However, the province's name and location of capital was changed back to Sukhothai in 1938.
Lom Sak	Lom Sak	1932	Merged into Phetchabun province
Thanyaburi	Thanyaburi	1932	Merged into Pathum Thani province
Kalasin	Kalasin	1932	Merged into Maha Sarakham province, Split out again in 1947
Lang Suan	Lang Suan	1932	Merged into Chumphon province
Takua Pa	Takua Pa	1932	Merged into Phang Nga province
Sai Buri	Sai Buri	1932	Merged into Pattani province (except Bacho District which was merged into Narathiwat province)
Phra Pradaeng	Phra Pradaeng	1932	Merged into Samut Prakan province (except Rat Burana District which was merged into Thonburi province)
Min Buri	Min Buri	1932	Merged into Phra Nakhon province (Nong Chok District was merged into Chachoengsao province first then reallocated back in 1933)
Samut Prakan (before 1943)	Samut Prakan	1943	Merged into Phra Nakhon province (except Ko Sichang District which was merged into Chonburi province). The part of Phra Nakhon was split out again in 1946
Nakhon Nayok	Nakhon Nayok	1943	Merged into Prachinburi province (except Ban Na District which was merged into Saraburi province). Split out again in 1946
Samut Sakhon	Samut Sakhon	1943	Merged into Thonburi province. Split out again in 1946
Nonthaburi	Nonthaburi	1943	Merged into Phra Nakhon province (except Bang Kruai District, Bang Yai District, Bang Bua Thong District which was merged into Thonburi province). Split out again in 1946
Phra Nakhon	Phra Nakhon	1971	Merged to form the current Bangkok
Thonburi	Thonburi	1971	Merged to form the current Bangkok

=== Conceded territories (including protectorates) ===
Territory	Capital	Period	Fate	Today part of
Salaween Territory	Chiang Mai	1802–1892	Karenni State and Shan State, (United Kingdom) British Burma	Kayah State and Shan State Myanmar
Kawtaung Territory	Chumphon	1769–1864	Mergui (United Kingdom) British Burma	Thanintharyi Myanmar
Chiang Mai Territory	Chiang Mai	1768–1834	Thaton (United Kingdom) British Burma	Myawaddy, Kayin State Myanmar
Sip Song Ju Tai	none	1779–1888	4e Territoire Millitaire, Son La, Lao Kay, Yen Bay, Pho Tho, Hoa Bin (France) French Indochina	Son La, Dien Bien, Lai Chau, Phu Tho, Yen Bai, Hoa Binh Vietnam
Chiang Khaeng (Muang Sing)	Muang Sing	1892–1893	Shan State (United Kingdom) British Burma and Haut Mekong (France) French Indochina	Shan State Myanmar and Luang Namtha Laos
Luang Phrabang	Luang Phrabang	1778–1893	Luang Phrabang (France) French Indochina	Luang Phrabang Laos
Chiang Khouang	Chiang Khouang	1828–1893	Tran Ninh (France) French Indochina	Xiangkhouang Laos
Borikhan Nikhom	Borikhan Nikhom	1828–1893	Vientiane (France) French Indochina	Bolikhamsai Laos
Kham Kert	Kham Kert	1828–1893	Khammouane (France) French Indochina	Bolikhamsai Laos
Kham Meun	Kham Meun	1828–1893	Khammouane (France) French Indochina	Khammouane Laos
Nakhon Phanom	Nakhon Phanom	1893	Partitioned between Nakhon Phanom Siam and Khammouane (France) French Indochina	Nakhon Phanom Thailand and Khammouane Laos
Mukdahan	Mukdahan	1893	Partitioned between Mukdahan Siam and Savannakhet (France) French Indochina	Mukdahan Thailand and Savannakhet Laos
Khemmarat	Khemmarat	1893	Partitioned between Khemmarat Siam and Salavan (France) French Indochina	Ubon Ratchathani Thailand and Salavan Laos
Nakhon Champassak	Nakhon Champassak	1780–1826 1829–1904	Partitioned between Det Udom Siam and Bassac, Attapeu, Stung Treng (France) French Indochina	Stung Treng Cambodia and Salavan, Attapeu Laos
Kham Thong Luang	Kham Tong Luang	1829–1893	Salavan (France) French Indochina	Salavan Laos
Salawan	Salawan	1829–1893	Salavan (France) French Indochina	Salavan Laos
Attapeu	Attapeu	1829–1893	Attapeu (France) French Indochina	Attapeu Laos
Sitadon	Sitadon	1829–1893	Bassac (France) French Indochina	Champassak Cambodia
Saen Pang	Saen Pang	1829–1893	Stung Treng (France) French Indochina	Stung Treng Cambodia
Chiang Taeng	Chiang Taeng	1829–1893	Stung Treng (France) French Indochina	Stung Treng Cambodia
Chaiburi	Chaiburi	1893–1904	Luang Phrabang (France) French Indochina	Sainyabuli Laos
Khukhan	Khukhan	1907	Partitioned between Khukhan Siam and Kampong Thom (France) French Indochina	Sisaket Thailand and Stung Treng, Kampong Thom Cambodia
Sangkha	Sangkha	1907	Partitioned between Sangkha Siam and Battambang (France) French Indochina	Surin Thailand and Oddar Meanchey, Banteay Meanchey Cambodia
Siemmarat	Siemmarat	1845–1907	Siem Reap (France) French Indochina	Siem Reap Cambodia
Phanom Sok	Phnom Srok	1845–1907	Siem Reap, Battambang (France) French Indochina	Siem Reap, Oddar Meanchey, Banteay Meanchey Cambodia
Sisophon	Sisophon	1845–1907	Battambang (France) French Indochina	Banteay Meanchey Cambodia
Phra Tabong	Phra Tabong	1769–1907	Battambang (France) French Indochina	Battambang, Banteay Meanchey Cambodia
Prachankiriket	Prachankiriket	1855–1904	Pursat and Kampot, (France) French Indochina	Pursat and Koh Kong, Cambodia
Penang	Penang	1786–1867	Penang (United Kingdom) British Malaya	Penang Malaysia
Lan Chang	Sama Buri	1941–1946	Luang Prabang, (France) French Indochina	Sainyabuli and Luang Prabang, Laos
Phra Tabong	Battambang	1941–1946	Battambang, (France) French Indochina	Battambang and Pailin, Cambodia
Phibunsongkhram	Sisophon	1941–1946	Battambang, Siem Reap, Kompong Thom and Stung Treng, (France) French Indochina	Banteay Meanchey, Oddar Meanchey and Siem Reap, Cambodia
Nakhon Champassak	Champasak	1941–1946	Kompong Thom, Stung Treng and Bassac, (France) French Indochina	Preah Vihear and Stung Treng, Cambodia; Champasak, Laos
Syburi	Alor Setar	1821–1909; 1943–1945	Kedah, (United Kingdom) British Malaya	Kedah, Malaysia
Palit	Kangar	1839–1909; 1943–1945	Perlis, (United Kingdom) British Malaya	Perlis, Malaysia
Kalantan	Kota Bharu	1786–1909; 1943–1945	Kelantan, (United Kingdom) British Malaya	Kelantan, Malaysia
Trangkanu	Kuala Terengganu	1786 –1909; 1943–1945	Terengganu, (United Kingdom) British Malaya	Terengganu, Malaysia
Saharat Thai Doem	Chiang Tung	1943–1945	Karenni State and Shan State, (United Kingdom) British Burma	Kayah State and Shan State Myanmar
Tanaosi	Tanaosi	until–1767	Dawei (Myanmar) Konbaung Dynasty	Thanintharyi Myanmar

=== Map of Siam in early 1893 ===
Provinces of Siam (Thailand) in 1871

== Historic administrative divisions of Thailand ==
1368 (Uthong)

1390 (Ramesuan)

1432 (Borommarachathirat II)

1468 (Borommatrailokkanat)

1545 (Chairachathirat)

1603 (Sanphet II)

1680 (Ramathibodi III)

1686 (Ramathibodi III)

1727 (Sanphet IX)

1767 (Borommaracha III)

1780 (Borommaracha IV)

1800 (Rama I)

1805 (Rama I)

1824 (Rama II)

1837 (Rama III)

1850 (Rama III)

1862 (Rama IV)

1882 (Rama V)

1890 (Rama V)

1893 (Rama V)

1900 (Rama V)

1906 (Rama V)

1908 (Rama V)

1916 (Rama VI)

1932 (Rama VII)

1939 (Rama VIII)

1941 (Rama VIII)

1945 (Rama VIII)

1950 (Rama IX)

1973 (Rama IX)

2023 (Rama X)

== See also ==
- ISO 3166-2:TH
- List of districts of Thailand
- List of Thai provinces by GPP
- Nationality, religion, and language data for the provinces of Thailand
- Organization of the government of Thailand
- Seals of the provinces of Thailand
- Administrative divisions of Thailand
