= Saiburi =

Saiburi may refer to:

- Syburi or Saiburi Province (Thai: ไทรบุรี), a Thai province after the annexation of northern Malay states in 1943 - 1945.
- Saiburi (Thai: ไทรบุรี), the Thai name for the Malay state of Kedah.
- Sai Buri District (Thai: สายบุรี), a district in Pattani Province.
