= Artificial person =

Artificial person may refer to:

- Juridical person, a legal person that is not a natural person
- Android (robot), a humanoid robot or other artificial being, often made from a flesh-like material
