= Thailand in World War II =

The territories and boundaries of Kingdom of Thailand in World War II.

Thailand officially adopted a neutral position during World War II until the five hour-long Japanese invasion of Thailand on 8 December 1941, which led to an armistice and military alliance treaty between Thailand and the Empire of Japan in mid-December 1941. At the start of the Pacific War, the Japanese Empire pressured the Thai government to allow the passage of Japanese troops to invade British-held Malaya and Burma. After the invasion, the Thai government was placed under Plaek Phibunsongkhram. Although Japanese troops maintained a heavy military presence, Thailand was officially an ally rather than a completely occupied territory, as the Thai government retained autonomy over its domestic affairs, military command, and judiciary. They considered it profitable to co-operate with the Japanese war efforts, since Thailand saw Japan as a partner who promised to help it gain some of the Indochinese territories (in today's Laos, Cambodia, and Vietnam). Following added pressure from the start of the Allied bombings of Bangkok due to the alliance with Japan, Thailand declared war on the United Kingdom and the United States and annexed territories in neighbouring countries, expanding to the north, south, and east, gaining a border with China near Kengtung.

After becoming an ally of the Empire of Japan, Thailand retained control of its armed forces and internal affairs. The Japanese policy on Thailand differed from their relationship with the puppet state of Manchukuo. Japan intended bilateral relationships similar to those between Nazi Germany and Finland, Bulgaria, and Romania. However, Thailand at that time was labelled by both the Japanese and the Allies as the "Italy of Asia" or "Oriental Italy," a secondary power.

Meanwhile, the Thai government had split into two factions: the Phibun regime and the Free Thai Movement, a well-organised, pro-Allied resistance movement that eventually numbered around 90,000 Thai guerrillas, supported by government officials allied to the regent Pridi Banomyong. The movement was active from 1942, resisting the Phibun regime and the Japanese. The partisans provided espionage services to the Allies, performed some sabotage activities, and helped engineer Phibun's downfall in 1944. After the war, Thailand returned the annexed territories but received little punishment for its wartime role under Phibun.

Thailand suffered around 7,600 people (5,569 military) deaths during the war. Deaths in combat included 150 in the Shan States, 180 on 8 December 1941 (the day of both the brief Japanese invasion and the failed British assault on the Ledge), and 100 during the brief Franco-Thai War.

== History ==
=== Background ===
Thailand, formerly known as Siam, was at the time one of few independent countries in Asia. However, the country was also struggling to modernize. Under absolute monarchy, the government was plagued by incompetence. Government service was lacking, poverty was high and even government official positions were fraught with glass ceilings. Thai culture was rooted in the idea that the country belonged to the monarch. Absolute monarchy was only ended by the 1932 Revolution carried out by Khana Ratsadon on 24 June 1932, and Thailand was still struggling to set up a modern government.

The civilian government set up by the Khana Ratsadon was embroiled in conflict with old conservative factions, and the new system of democracy was short lived. In April 1933, the first prime minister Phraya Manopakorn Nitithada dissolved the parliament and suspended the judiciary in a coup. His government then began to adopt more monarchist and conservative policies. It was in this era that Thailand saw its first anti-communist legislation passed, which would later be used by various governments to silence political opponents. The generals of Khana Ratsadon launched a second coup in June to regain power. This new government headed by Phraya Phahon Phonphayuhasena would attempt to carry out elections and follow the constitution. His government would also see a civil war that killed 17 members of the government force and an unknown amount of rebel forces. The end of this conflict saw the military promote themselves as the protector of democracy. Under the Phraya Phahon government, the parliament saw its first elected representatives, lasted its entire four-year term, and was succeeded by another elected parliament. Prime Minister Phraya Phahon left office on 13 December 1938, citing that the military should not be running the country and his health problems. He was succeeded by Plaek Phibunsongkhram. Under Phibun, Thailand saw a decline in democracy.

==== Military dictatorship ====
Prior to Phibun's premiership, the Thai military led by Phibun as defence minister, and the civilian liberals led by Pridi Banomyong as foreign minister, worked together harmoniously for several years, but when Phibun became prime minister in December 1938 this co-operation broke down, and military domination became more overt. His regime soon developed some fascist characteristics. In early 1939 forty political opponents, both monarchists and democrats, were arrested, and after rigged trials eighteen were executed, the first political executions in Siam in over a century. Many others, among them Prince Damrong Rajanubhab and Phraya Songsuradet, were exiled. Phibun launched a demagogic campaign against the Chinese business class. Chinese schools and newspapers were closed, and taxes on Chinese businesses increased.

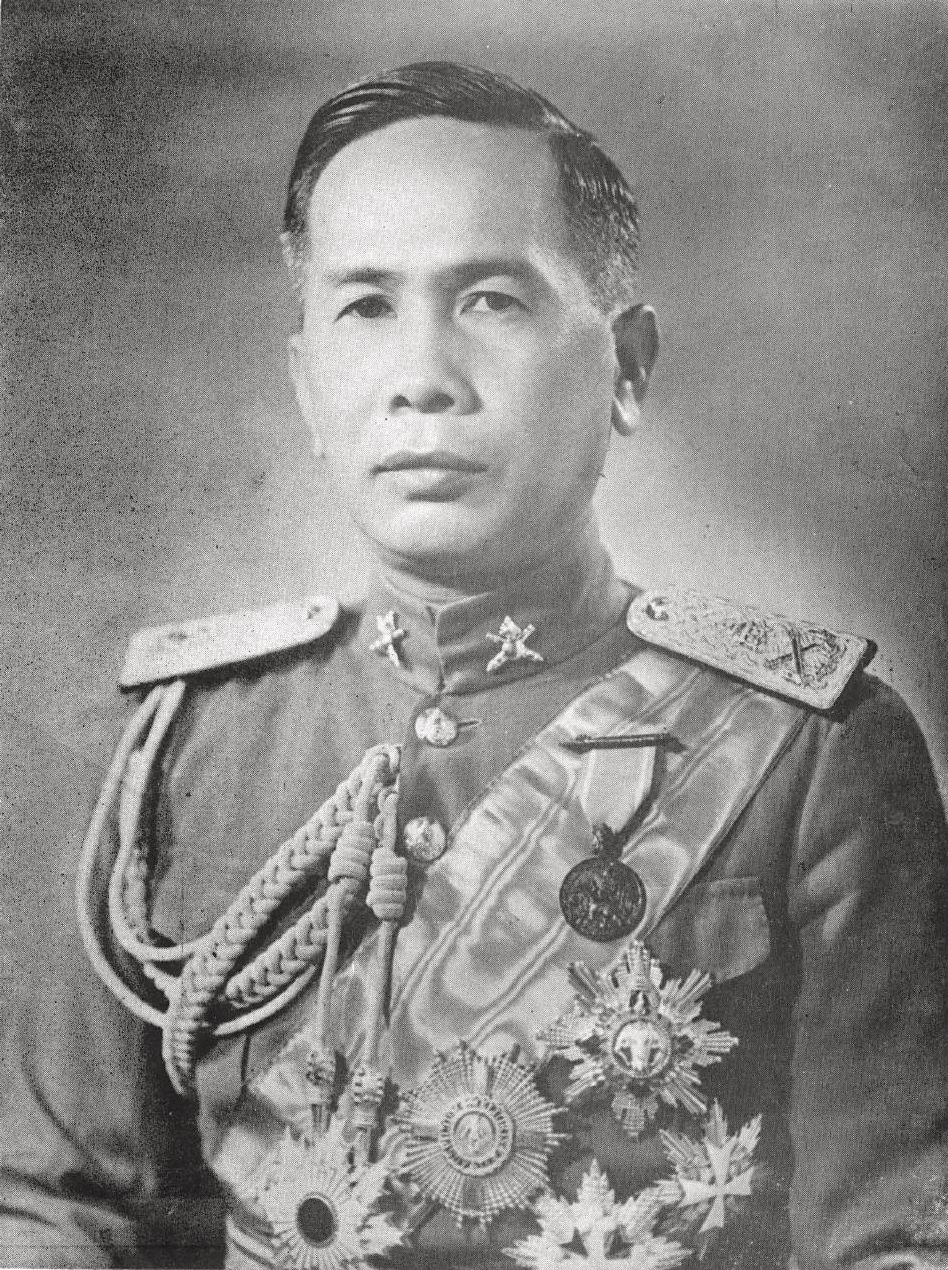
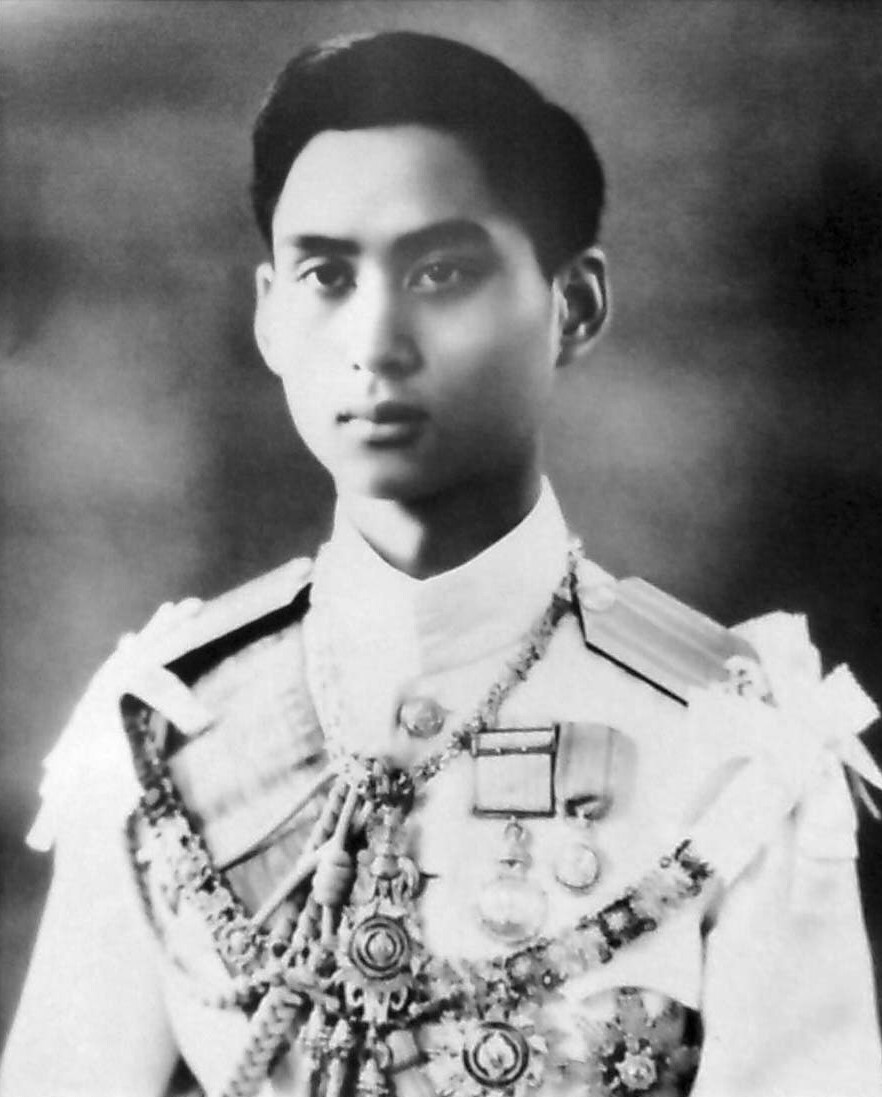
(First) Plaek Phibunsongkhram, Chief of the Royal Thai Army and Prime Minister from 1938 until 1944. (Second) King Ananda Mahidol. During the war he stayed in neutral Switzerland. He returned to Thailand in 1945.

Phibun and Luang Wichitwathakan, the government's ideological spokesman, copied the propaganda techniques used by Adolf Hitler and Benito Mussolini to build up the cult of the leader. Aware of the power of mass media, they used the government's monopoly on radio broadcasting to shape popular support for the regime. Popular government slogans were constantly aired on the radio and plastered on newspapers and billboards. Phibun's picture was also to be seen everywhere in society, while portraits of the ex-monarch King Prajadhipok, an outspoken critic of the autocratic regime, were banned. At the same time Phibun passed a number of authoritarian laws which gave the government the power of almost unlimited arrest and complete press censorship. During the Second World War, newspapers were instructed to print only good news emanating from Axis sources, while sarcastic comments about the internal situation were banned.

On 23 June 1939, Phibun changed the country's name from Siam to Thailand, said to mean "land of the free". This was directed against the ethnic diversity in the country (Malay, Chinese, Lao, Shan, etc.) and is based on the idea of a "Thai race", a Pan-Thai nationalism whose policy is the integration of the Shan, the Lao and other Tai peoples, such as Vietnam, Burma and South China, into a "Great Kingdom of Thailand" (Thai: มหาอาณาจักรไทย)

Modernisation was also an important theme in Phibun's new Thai nationalism. From 1939 to 1942 he issued a set of twelve Cultural Mandates. In addition to requiring that all Thais salute the flag, sing the national anthem, and speak the national language, the mandates also encouraged Thais to work hard, stay informed on current events, and to dress in a Western fashion. The mandates caused performances of traditional Thai music, dance, theatre and culture to be abolished, and changed into Western style.

Meanwhile, all cinemas were instructed to display Phibun's picture at the end of every performance as if it were the king's portrait, and the audience were expected to rise and bow. Phibun also called himself The Leader, in a bid to create a personality cult.

==== Thai-Japan naval co-operation ====
The Royal Thai Navy contracted the Japanese Kawasaki Shipbuilding Corporation of Kobe and Mitsubishi to construct coastal defence ships and submarines.

=== Thai Invasion of French-Indochina (1940–1941) ===
At the start of World War II, Phibun shared many of his countrymen's admiration of fascism and the rapid pace of national development it seemed to afford. Consequently, Phibun cultivated and intensified militarism and nationalism while simultaneously building a cult of personality using modern propaganda techniques.

The regime also revived irredentist claims, stirring up anti-French sentiment. Seeking support against France, Phibun cultivated closer relations with Japan. Faced with American opposition and British hesitancy, Thailand looked to Japan for help in the confrontation with French Indochina. Although the Thais were united in their demand for the return of the lost provinces, Phibun's enthusiasm for the Japanese was markedly greater than that of Pridi Banomyong, and many old conservatives as well viewed the course of the prime minister's foreign policy with misgivings.

==== Franco-Thai War ====
In October 1940, the Franco-Thai War broke out. The war was a sporadic battle between Thai and French forces along Thailand's eastern frontier and culminated in an invasion of Laos and Cambodia in January 1941. The Royal Thai Armed Forces were successful in occupying the territories in French Indochina, with the French scoring their only notable victory at sea at the Battle of Ko Chang.

Japan used its influence with Vichy France to obtain concessions for Thailand. As a result, Vichy France agreed in March 1941 to cede 54,000 square kilometres of Laotian territory west of the Mekong and most of the Cambodian province to Thailand. The recovery of territory and the regime's apparent victory over a European colonial power greatly enhanced Phibun's reputation.

Because Japan wanted to maintain both its working relationship with Vichy and the status quo, the real beneficiaries of the conflict were the Japanese. They were able to expand their influence in both Thailand and Indochina. The Japanese intention was to use Thailand and Indochina as their military base to invade Burma and Malaya in the future.

The Thais accepted a quarter of the territory that they had lost to the French, in addition to having to pay six million piastres as a concession to the French. Relations between Japan and Thailand subsequently stressed as a disappointed Phibun switched to courting the British and Americans in the hopes of warding off what he saw as an imminent Japanese invasion.

=== Adoption of neutrality ===
After the Franco-Thai War, Phibun compromised with Pridi, and the Thai government adopted a policy of neutrality. Pridi himself sponsored production of a Thai historical drama film, The King of the White Elephant. The film carried a propaganda message from anti-war interests in Thailand: Thailand should remain neutral, only going to war to defend its sovereignty against foreign invaders.

=== War comes to Thailand ===
Phibun and the Thai government were still hesitant to join the Allies or the Japanese. At 23:00 on 7 December, the Japanese presented the Thai government with an ultimatum to allow the Japanese military to enter Thailand for Malaya and Burma campaign. The Thais were given two hours to respond, but the Thai government did not have any response.

After the expiration of the ultimatum, On 8 December 1941, less than four hours after the attack on Pearl Harbor, Japan invaded Thailand. The Japanese military made landings south of Bangkok and along the Kra Isthmus. After several hours of fighting between Thai and Japanese troops on the Battle of Prachuap Khiri Khan, the Thai Government and Japanese arranged a cease fire. Phibun assured the country that the Japanese action was pre-arranged with a sympathetic Thai government. Thailand acceded to Japanese demands for passage through the country for Japanese forces invading Burma and Malaya.

=== Military alliance with Japan (1941–1945) ===
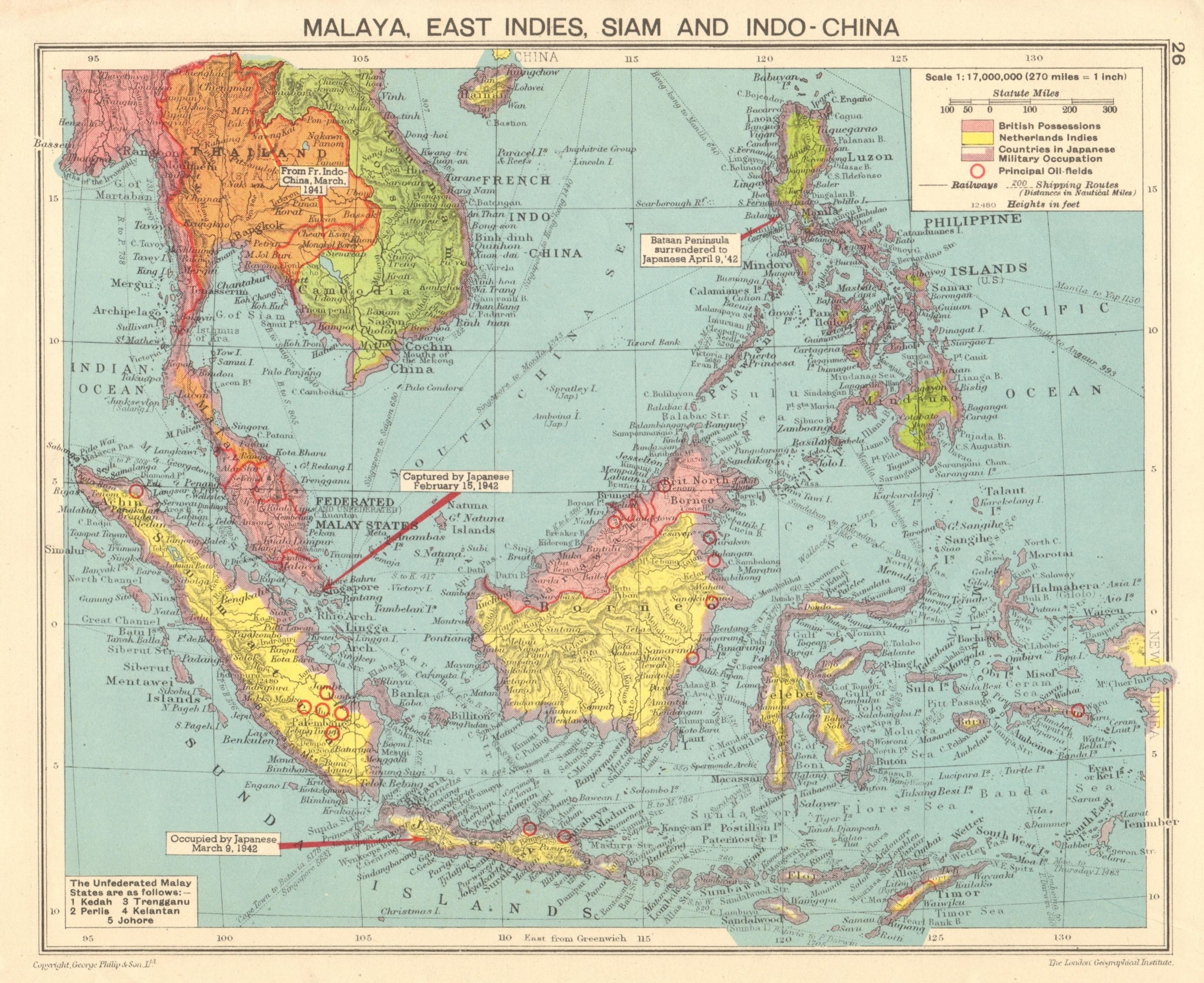
Malaya, East Indies, Siam and Indo-China map, 1942

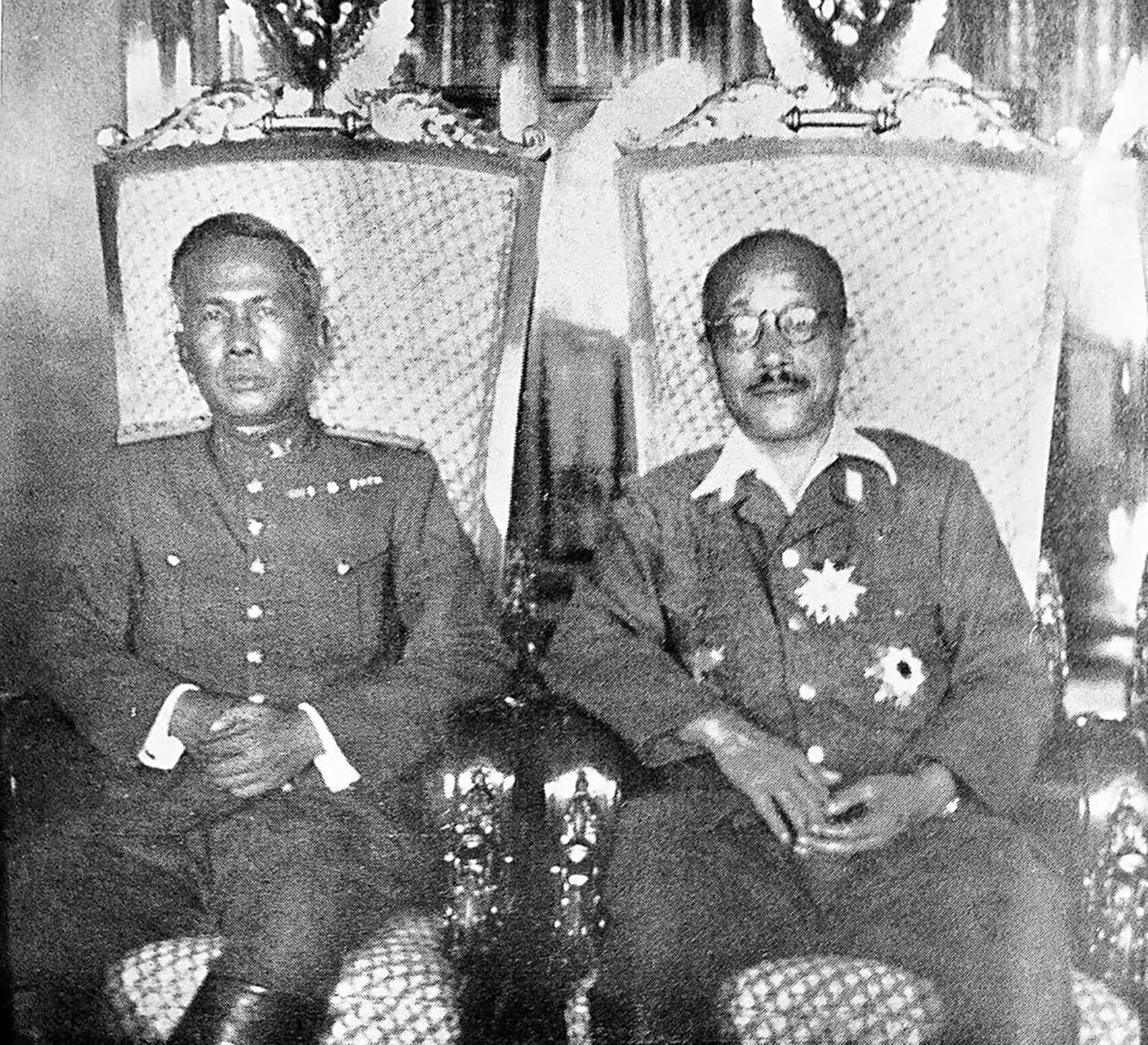
Plaek Phibun with Hideki Tojo in Bangkok on 6 July 1943

==== The War in Malaya ====
The Japanese military used Thailand, as well as north-eastern coast of Malaya as a stepping stone to invade the Malaya Peninsula. The Royal Thai Police resisted British Commonwealth forces invading Southern Thailand in December 1941 at The Battle of Betong, following the Japanese invasion of Malaya. Thailand was rewarded for Phibun's close co-operation with Japan during the early years of war with the return of further territory that had once been under Bangkok's control, namely the four northernmost Malay states after the Malayan Campaign.

==== Burma Railway ====
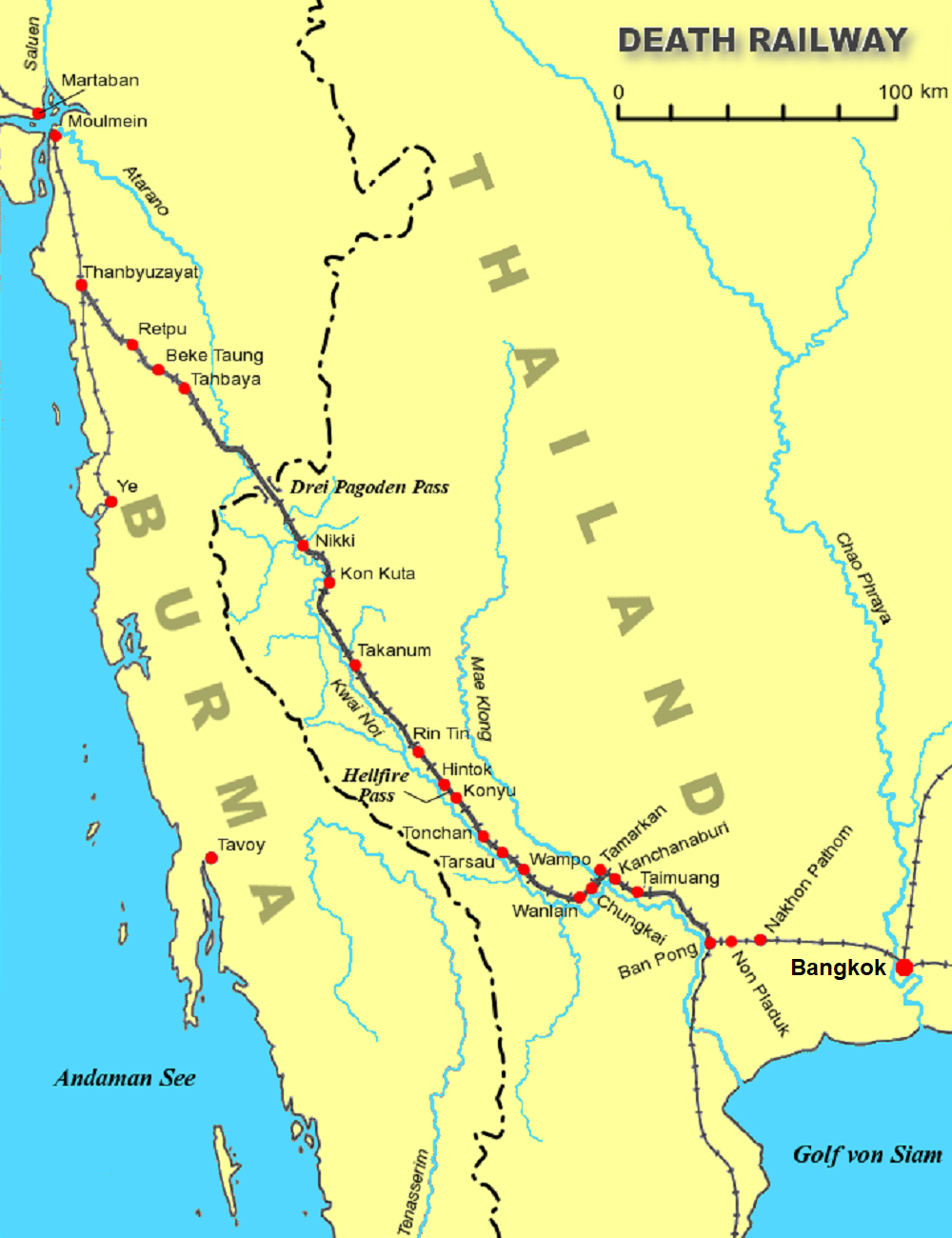
Map of the Burma Railway.

On 21 December 1941, a mutual offensive-defensive alliance pact between the two countries was signed. The agreement, revised on 30 December, gave the Japanese full access to Thai weaponry and to Thai railways, roads, airfields, naval bases, warehouses, communications systems, and barracks. To promote greater military and economic co-operation, Pridi was removed from the cabinet and offered a seat on the politically impotent Regency Council of the absent king, which he subsequently accepted. Japan meanwhile stationed 150,000 troops on Thai soil and built the famous Burma Railway through Thailand using Asian labourers and Allied prisoners of war, with more than 100,000 dying in the process.

==== Allied bombing of Thailand ====
Since the Empire of Japan was using the country as a staging area for its invasions of Allied colonies in Southeast Asia. On 7 January 1942, allied planes began bombing raids on the Thai capital city of Bangkok. With this added pressure, the Phibun government decided to declare war on the Allies. Later, Thailand declared war on the United Kingdom and the United States on 25 January 1942.

==== Contrast of Thai and Japanese policy ====
After the Thai government declared war on the United Kingdom and the United States on 25 January 1942, Phibun was inspired by the Japanese military operation in Malaya and China. Phibun and Luang Wichitwathakan believed that if the Japanese won the war Thailand could gain some territories. Finally Phibun re-adopted the previous "Great Thai Kingdom policy", but the Japanese had the idea of the Greater East Asia Co-Prosperity Sphere. The Thais, who loathed the idea of being treated on the same level as the two Japanese puppet regimes, Manchukuo and the Wang Jingwei regime, initially resisted, but ultimately the Japanese had their way. Thai resentment on this issue lasted throughout the war, however, and resulted in Phibun refusing to attend the following year's Greater East Asia Conference.

Although the Thai ambassador in London delivered Phibun's declaration of war to the British government, the Thai ambassador in Washington, D.C., Seni Pramoj, refused to do so. Accordingly, the United States did not declare war on Thailand. With American assistance, Seni, a conservative aristocrat with well established anti-Japanese credentials, organised the Free Thai Movement in the United States, recruiting Thai students to work with the United States Office of Strategic Services (OSS). Seni was able to achieve this because the State Department decided to act as if Seni continued to represent Thailand, enabling him to draw on Thai assets frozen by the United States.

==== The War in Burma ====
In addition to the Japanese conquest of Burma, the Thai Phayap Army was permitted to invade the part of the Shan States and Karenni States of Burma that was annexed as Saharat Thai Doem.

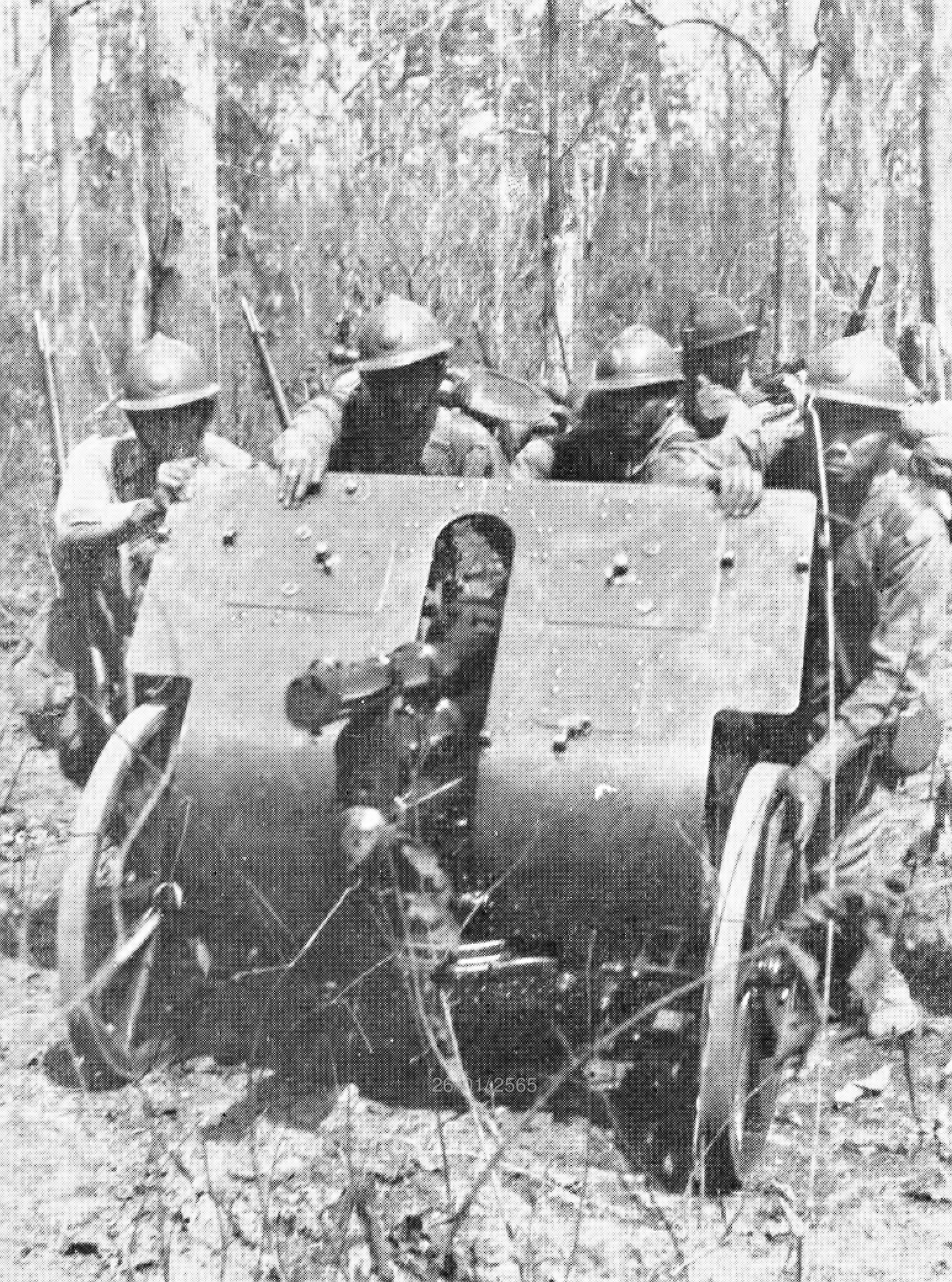
Thai Phayap Army soldiers wearing Adrian helmets, moving artillery in Burma, 1943.

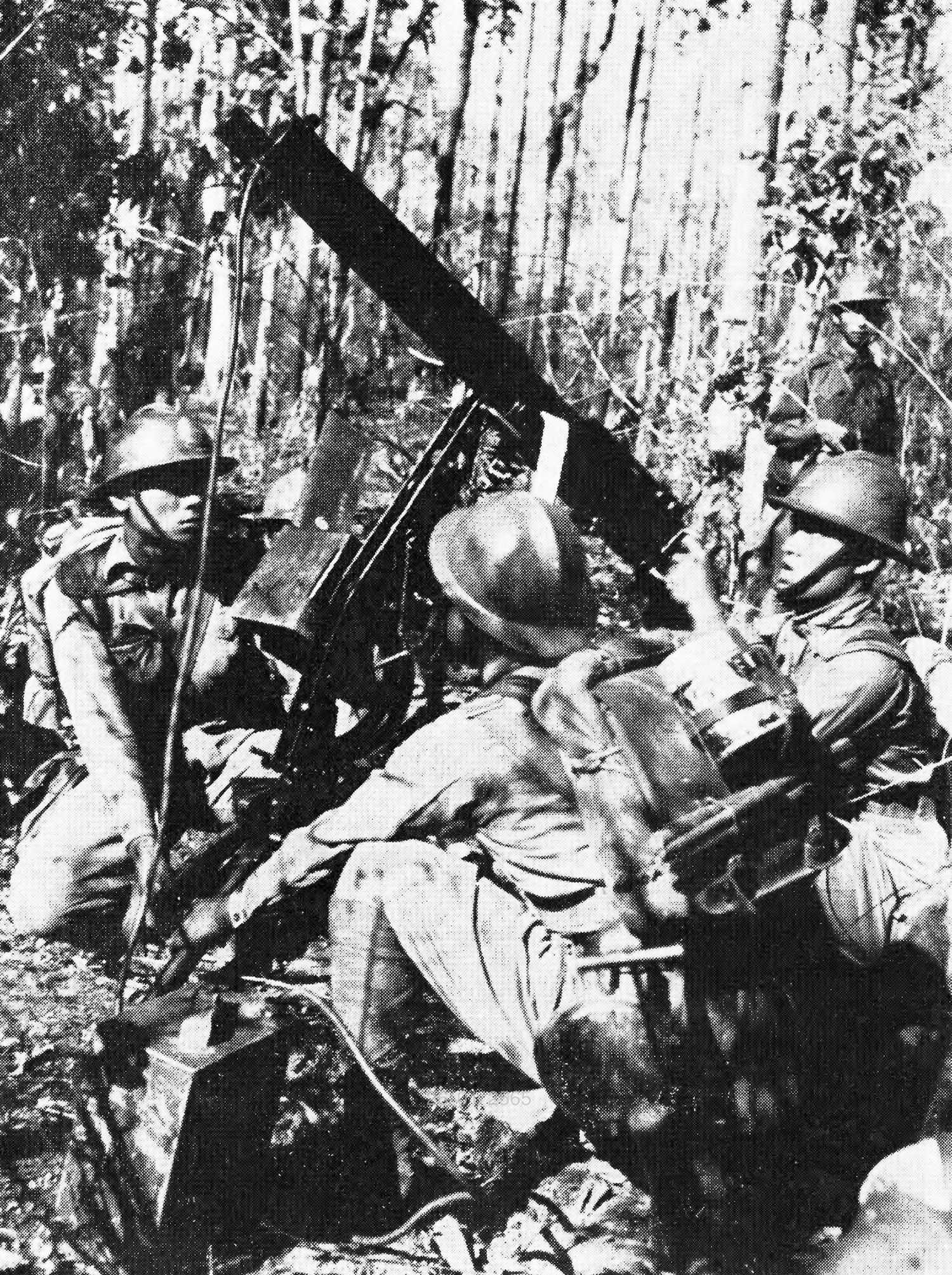
Thai Phayap Army fighting in Burma Campaign, 1943.

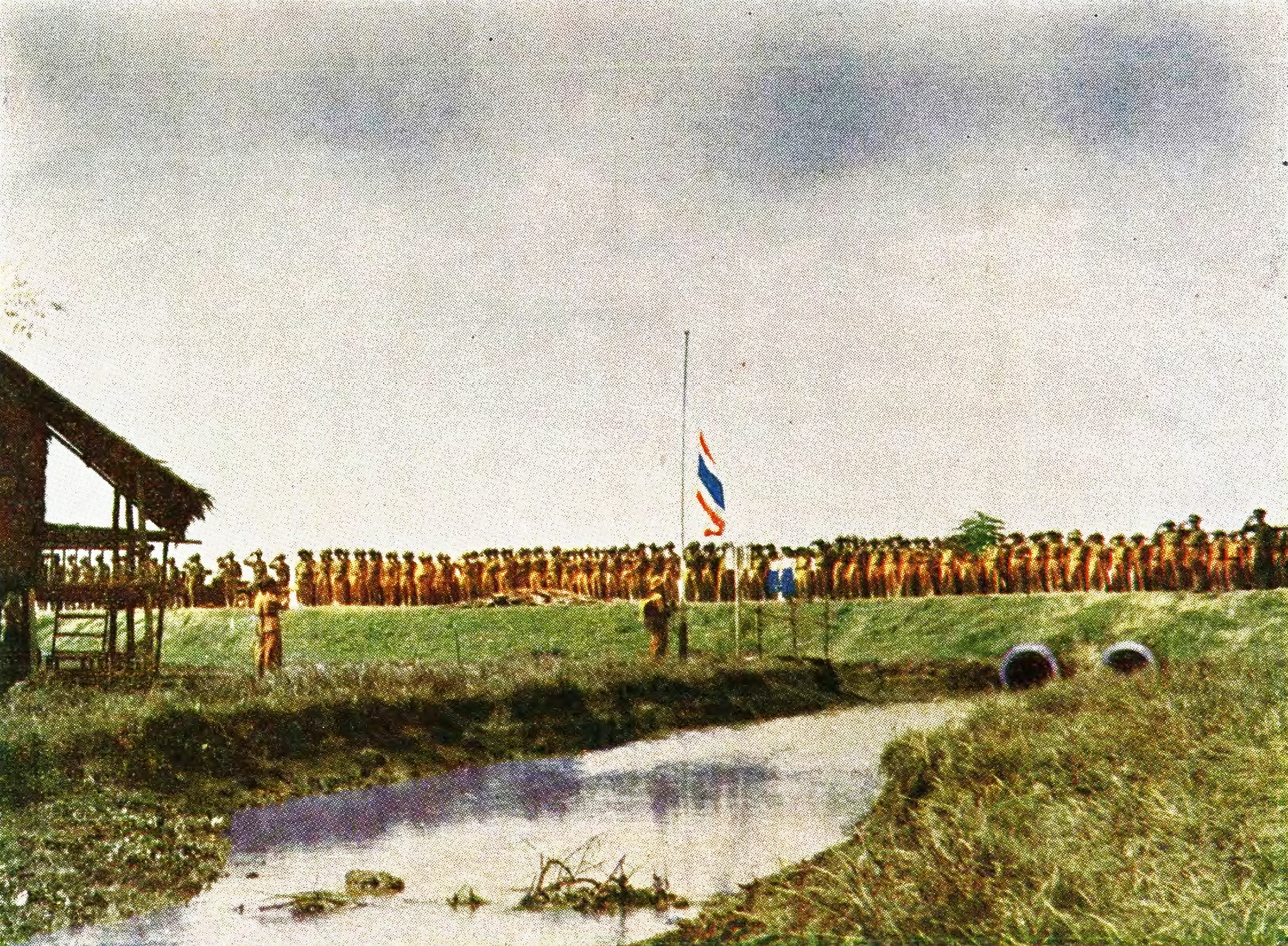
Thai soldiers and governmental officials occupying a Burmese village.

===== Thai forces enter Burma =====
The leading elements of the Thai Phayap Army under General J. R. Seriroengrit crossed the border into the Shan States on 10 May 1942. Three Thai infantry division and one cavalry division, spearheaded by armoured reconnaissance groups and supported by the Royal Thai Air Force, engaged the retreating Chinese 93rd Division from Shan State. Kengtung, the main objective, was captured on 27 May. On 12 July, General Phin Choonhavan (who would become the Thai military governor of the occupied Shan State later in the war) ordered the 3rd Division of the Phayap Army from the southern part of the Shan State to occupy Karenni State and expel the Chinese 55th Division from Loikaw. The Chinese troops could not retreat because the routes to Yunnan were controlled by Axis forces and many Chinese soldiers were captured. The Thais remained in control of the Shan States for the remainder of the war. Their troops suffered from supply shortages and disease, but were not subjected to Allied attacks.

==== Bangkok floods ====
In September 1942, there was a long rainy season in Northern, Northeastern and Central regions of Thailand, causing great floods in many provinces, including Bangkok. In Bangkok, the major flooding was recorded as having effects on the city's infrastructure lasting three months.

With the floods, many agricultural areas were flooded, especially the rice fields, which caused a serious shortage of rice. The Thai government decided to encourage people to eat noodles instead. "Pad Thai," the famous dish, was also introduced at that time.

Although the majority of Thais were initially "intoxicated" with Japan's string of brilliant victories in early 1942, by the end of the year there was widespread resentment as a result of arrogant Japanese behaviour and war-induced privation. Even during the early stages of the war there was friction over issues such as the confiscation of Allied property and economic and monetary matters, as well as the treatment of Thailand's ethnic Chinese community.

A vicious contest for saw mills and teak forests owned by British companies erupted early on, followed by similar disputes over the control of enemy energy and shipping facilities within the country. Other problems were more severe. For a time Germany continued actively purchasing Thai products, but once shipping difficulties became intractable, Japan became Thailand's sole significant trading partner. Similarly, Thailand had to rely on the Japanese for consumer goods previously imported from Europe and the United States, which Japan was increasingly unable to provide as the war wore on. A shortage of commodities quickly developed, with inflation soaring and standards of living dropping. Worse still, the Japanese had aggressively claimed the right to import goods duty-free, significantly reducing Thai government revenues.

==== Thai offensive into China ====
After the Imperial Japanese Army seized Rangoon, British and Chinese troops were forced to withdraw from Burma. On 9 May 1942, the Thai Phayap army crossed the Thai-Burmese border and engaged the Chinese Expeditionary Force. Thais captured many Chinese soldiers, and in 1943 the Phayap Army invasion headed to Xishuangbanna in China, but were driven back by the Chinese Expeditionary Forces.

The Thai government feared that Phibun might lose popularity. Consequently, the government spokesman decided to lie to its people. Luang Wichit announced the Phayap Army had captured Xishuangbanna. Thailand also oversaw a military occupation over significant sections in a Burma-China border, west of Yunnan. But despite the official territorial achievements, the so-called "Great Thai Kingdom" was a paper tiger. It was faltering as its economy failed to adapt to the conditions of war, natural disaster (floods) and the Thai capital being bombed by the Allies.

=== Resistance ===
In December 1942 an armed confrontation between Japanese troops and Thai villagers and police escalated into a shoot-out in Ratchaburi. Although the Ban Pong incident was promptly and peacefully resolved, it served as "a warning signal that alerted Tokyo to the seriousness of the problems in Thailand". This led to General Aketo Nakamura being sent to command the newly formed Thailand Garrison Army. Nakamura's ability to understand the Thai perspective, combined with his affable personality, significantly helped to improve Thai-Japanese relations. The other Japanese intention was to help defend Thailand, Nakamura expected that it could defend against a possible invasion by the Allies from Burma.

This more conciliatory stance occurred at a moment when the tide began to turn against Japan, something which many within the Thai government recognised. Realising that the Allies had seized the initiative in the war, Phibun, well aware of his predicament, distanced himself from the Japanese. In January 1943 he had two of the Phayap Army's divisional commanders arrange the return of a group of Chinese prisoners-of-war as a gesture of friendship designed to open secret negotiations with Chongqing.

But the prime minister's star was waning at a much faster rate than he had thought. With the Allies intensifying their bombing raids on Bangkok, public confidence in Phibun, already tested by his idiosyncratic domestic policies, was waning fast. His frequent absence from Bangkok led morale to plummet, while a sudden proclamation that the capital and its inhabitants immediately be moved north to malaria-infested Phetchabun was greeted with near-universal bemusement and discontent. The kingdom's ruling elite was becoming increasingly weary of Phibun, whose intimidation and demotion of dissenters within the government served to further unite his opponents, who were rallying to Pridi.

Even the Japanese were becoming disaffected with Phibun. The possibility that a military scheme lay behind Phibun's attempt to relocate the seat of government was not lost on the Japanese. Remote, with the nearest rail connection at Phitsanulok, a half-day's drive away, Phetchabun's main asset was its suitability as a mountainous fortress. Moreover, the site was in an area where the majority of the Thai army was based.

Coinciding with Phibun's efforts to distance himself from the Japanese, the Allied Invasion of Italy and the downfall of Benito Mussolini sent shock waves through the Thai government, and an emergency cabinet meeting was convened to discuss the European situation. Analogies with Italy were soon being made. "Badoglio" became an increasingly popular Thai political epithet, and the Japanese envoy in Berlin was advised by Reichsmarschall Hermann Göring to keep a close watch on Thailand, lest it turn into an "Oriental Italy." Despite the increasing domestic discontent and Japanese distrust, Phibun's political demise would not come until the following year.

Pridi, the regent, from his office at Thammasat University, ran a clandestine movement that, by the end of the war, had, with Allied aid, armed more than 50,000 Thais to resist the Phibun government and the Japanese. In 1944 he managed to engineer the unseating of Phibun, who was replaced by Khuang Aphaiwong, the civilian son of a minor nobleman and linked politically with conservatives like Seni. Khuang's main task was to continue the charade of collaboration whilst shielding the growing underground movement. He succeeded in this to a great extent, convincing not only Nakamura, but also the notorious Masanobu Tsuji.

Pridi had to take into consideration that the Japanese were building up their forces in Thailand, which was likely to become a battlefront in the near future. Previously most Japanese soldiers stationed in Thailand had been support troops, but in December 1944 the local command had been upgraded from garrison status to a field army. The Japanese were gathering supplies and constructing fortifications for a last-ditch defensive effort at Nakhon Nayok, about 100 kilometres northeast of Bangkok.

By the beginning of 1945, preparations were actively being pursued for a rising against the Japanese. Plans for an uprising relied on the success of a quick, surprise strike by a special police unit against the Japanese command structure. The residences of leading officers and the Japanese communications facilities were kept under surveillance. The police assault was to be coordinated with a general attack by the partly mechanised Thai 1st Army against Japanese troops in Bangkok. Fortifications, in the guise of air raid shelters, had been dug at key crossroads, and additional troops had been brought into the city in small groups in civilian clothing. The task of Free Thai forces elsewhere would be to thwart Japanese efforts to reinforce their Bangkok garrison by cutting communications lines and seizing airfields.

=== Thai annexed territories ===
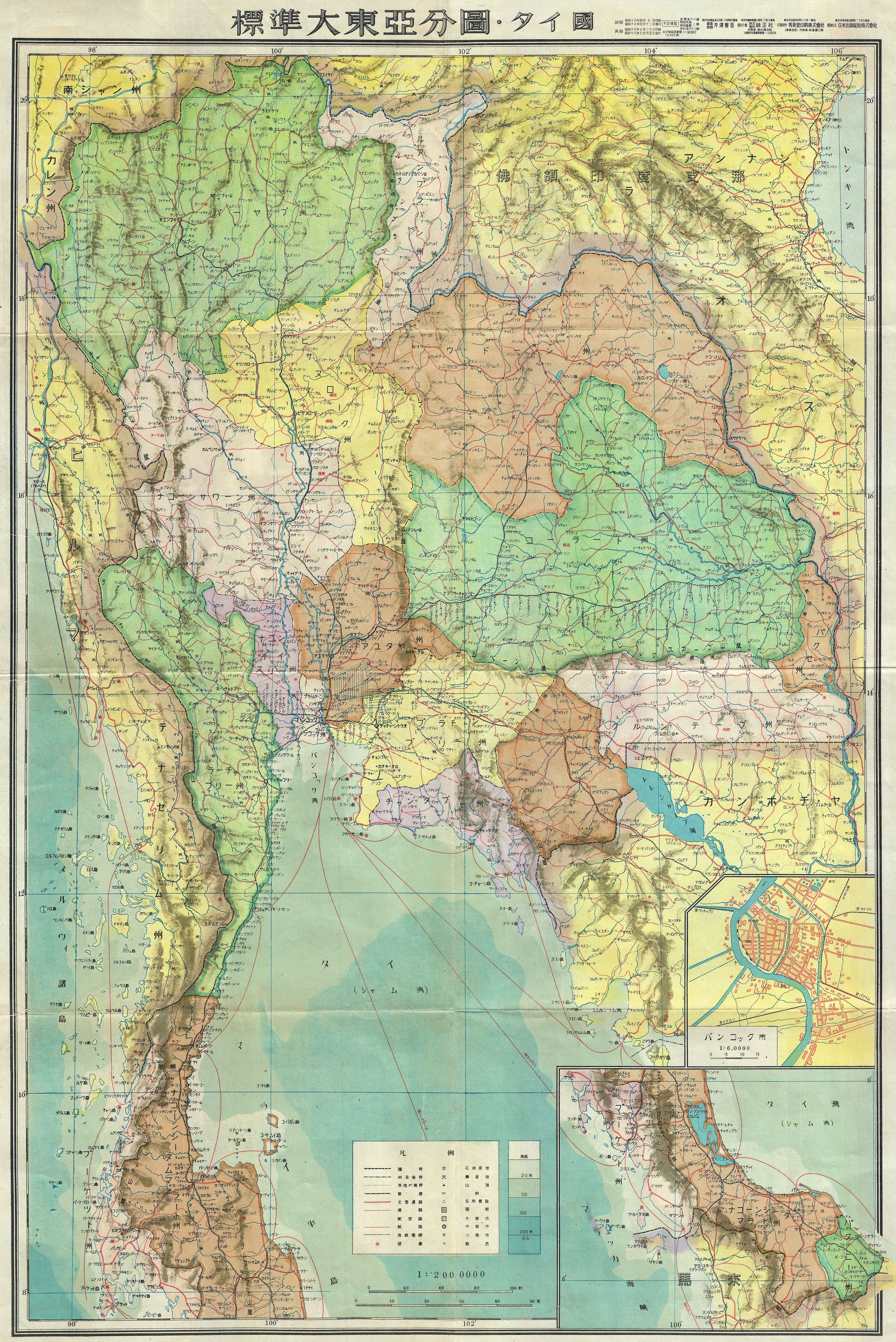
Map of Thailand during World War II in Japanese, 1943

The following territories of Burma, Laos, Cambodia and Malaya were annexed by Thailand during World War II. The Thai army would remain in these territories until the end of the war.

- Saharat Thai Doem (Burma), including Mueang Phan District. It did not include, however, the two districts of Möngmaü and Mehsakun of Mawkmai of the southern Shan States, nor part of Kandarawadi in the Karenni States, all east of the Salween River, which although claimed by Thailand, were assigned by the Japanese to their client State of Burma in September 1943.
- Si Rat Malai (Malaysia), including Syburi (Kedah State).
- Lan Chang province (Laos)
- Nakhon Champassak province (Laos and Cambodia)
- Phra Tabong province (Cambodia)
- Phibunsongkhram province (Cambodia)

Following the fall of the Phibun government in August 1944, the new government of Khuang Aphaiwong communicated to the British government that it renounced all claims to the Shan states and northern Malaya, and that it would immediately cede the territories to Britain. The Churchill government did not accept the Thai overture, and was prepared to retaliate. The Thai army evacuated the two Shan states only in August 1945.

Thailand was still allied with Japan when the war ended, but the United States proposed a solution. In 1946 Thailand agreed to cede the territories regained during Japanese presence in the country as the price for admission to the United Nations, consequently all wartime claims against Thailand were dropped and the country received a substantial package of U.S. aid. Following this event, all the Thai-occupied territories returned to their pre-war status and became again part of the states from which they were annexed.

Parts of Cambodia and Laos annexed by Thailand (1941–1946).

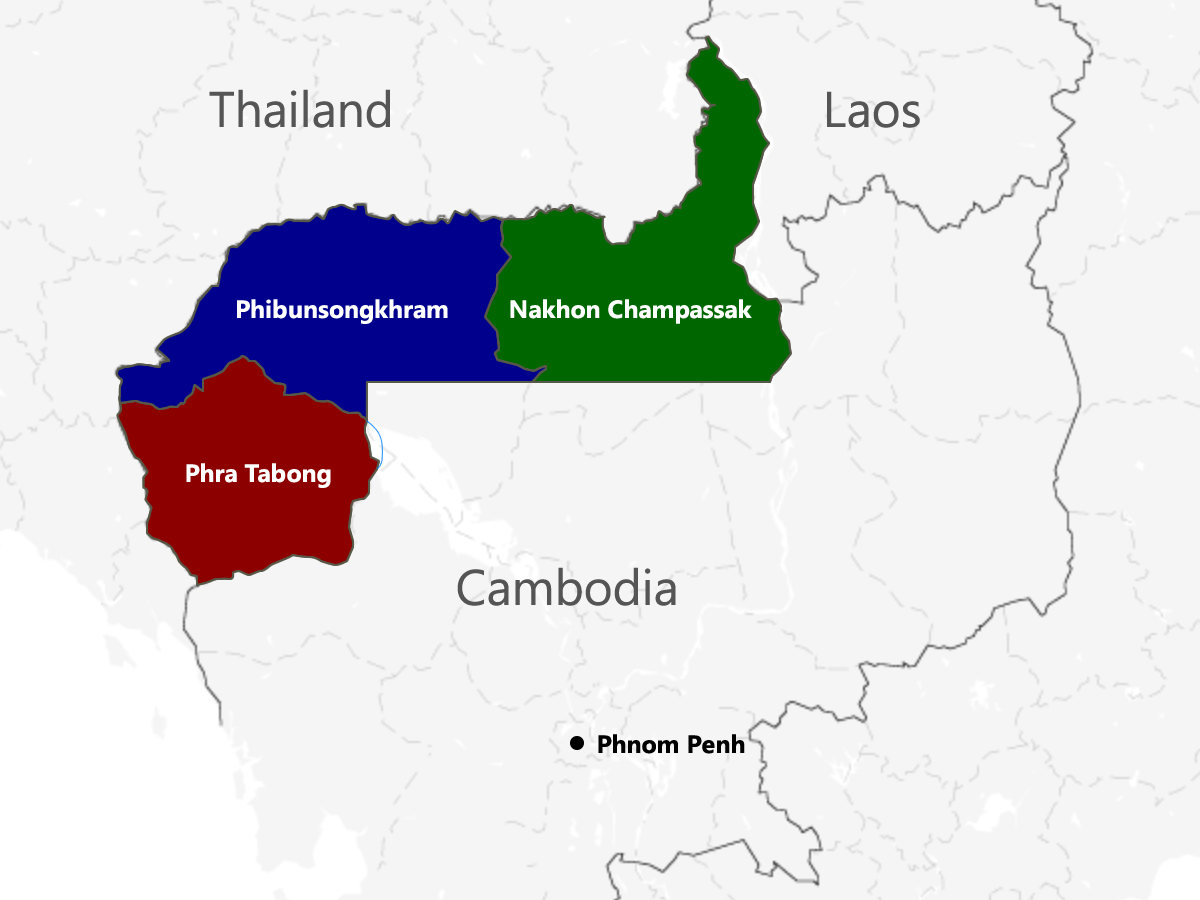
Provinces ceded from French Indochina regrouped into new Thai provinces: Phra Tabong, Phibunsongram, and Nakhon Champassak.

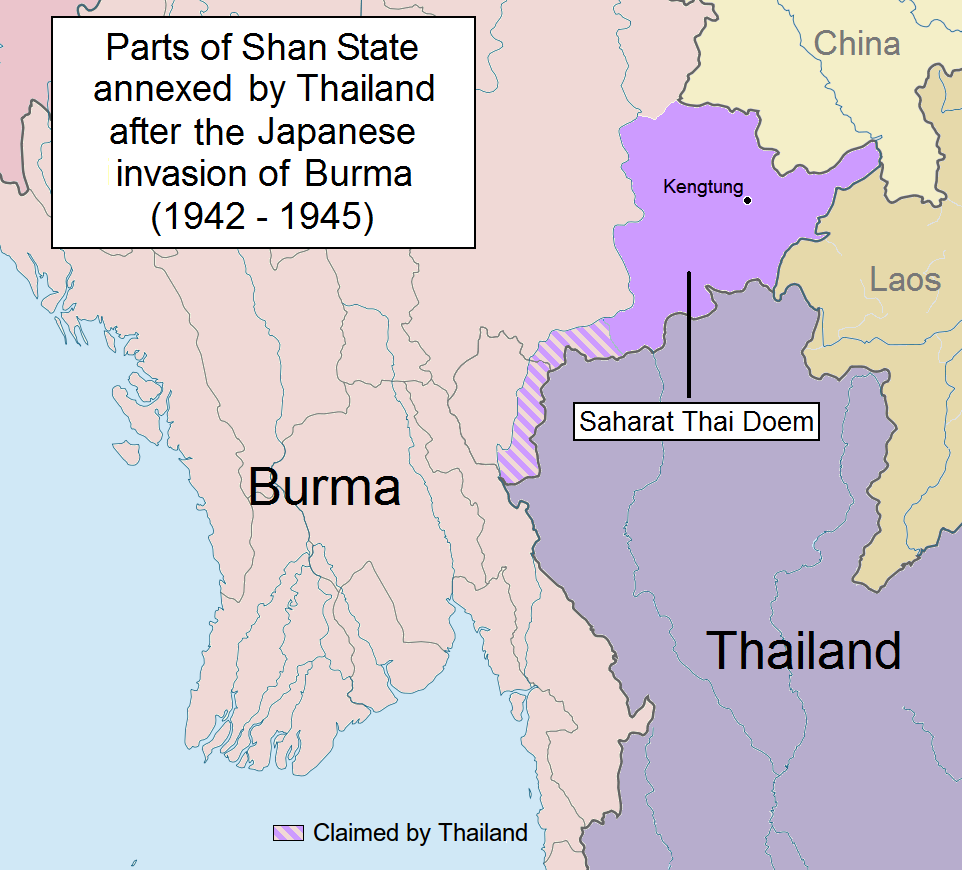
Saharat Thai Doem map (1942–1945) and claims of Thailand in British Burma

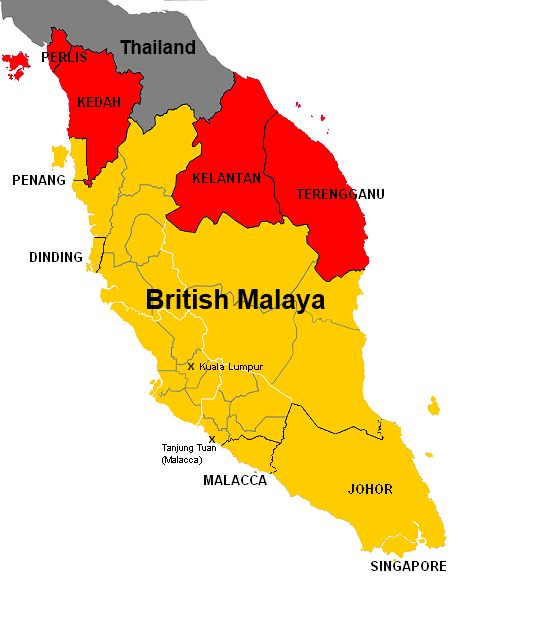
Si Rat Malai, Parts of British Malaya annexed by Thailand (1943–1945).

=== Post-war ===
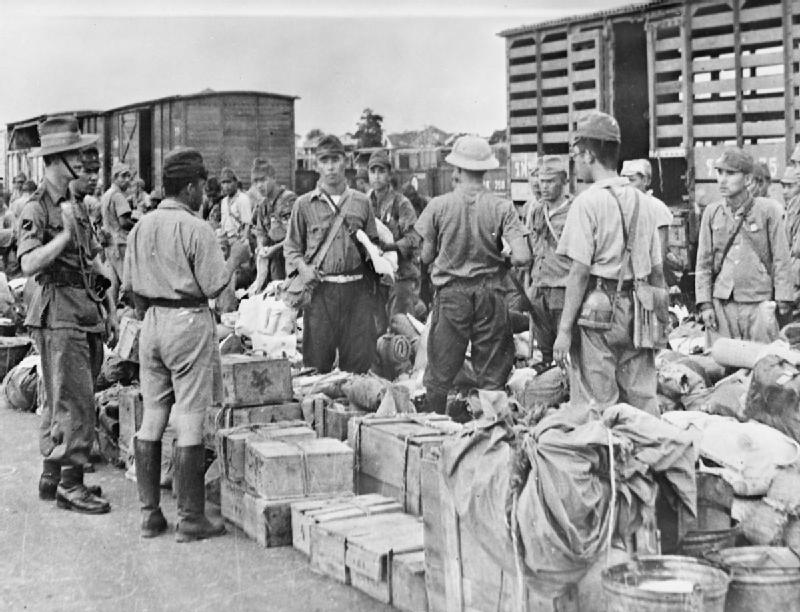
A British officer of a Gurkha regiment supervises Japanese prisoners at Bangkok railway station September 1945

When the German Wehrmacht surrendered in May 1945, a German envoy was still in Bangkok.

The atomic bombings and subsequent Japanese surrender precluded the uprising, however. Pridi immediately issued a declaration stating that Phibun's 1942 declaration of war was unconstitutional and legally void, thereby dispensing any need for Thailand to surrender. The Thai armed forces initially attempted to disarm the Japanese garrison, but Nakamura refused, arguing that the matter was for the Allies to decide. Khuang in the meanwhile resigned, citing his previous association with the Japanese as a possible obstacle to Thailand's reapprochement with the Allies. A caretaker premier was found in Thawi Bunyaket, a Pridi loyalist.

In early September the leading elements of Major-General Geoffrey Charles Evans's Indian 7th Infantry Division landed, accompanied by Edwina Mountbatten. Later that month Seni returned from Washington to succeed Tawee as prime minister. It was the first time in over a decade that the government was controlled by civilians. But the ensuing factional scramble for power in late 1945 created political divisions in the ranks of the civilian leaders that destroyed their potential for making a common stand against the resurgent political force of the military in the post-war years.

Moreover, the post-war accommodations with the Allies weakened the civilian government. As a result of the contributions made to the Allied war efforts by the Free Thai Movement, the United States refrained from dealing with Thailand as an enemy country in post-war peace negotiations. Before signing a peace treaty, however, Britain demanded war reparations in the form of rice shipments to Malaya. An Anglo-Thai Peace Treaty was signed on 1 January 1946, and an Australian–Thai Peace Treaty on 3 April. France refused to permit admission of Thailand to the United Nations until Indochinese territories annexed during the war were returned. The Soviet Union insisted on the repeal of anti-communist legislation.

== See also ==
- Japanese invasion of Thailand
- Thai cultural mandates
- Syburi
- Khu Kam
- Sunset at Chaopraya
- The Overture

== Citations ==
=== Cited works ===
- Aung Tun, Sai (2009). History of the Shan State: From Its Origins to 1962. Chiang Mai: Silk Worm Books. ISBN 978-974-9511-43-5.https://m.pantip.com/topic/33186741? https://mgronline.com/onlinesection/detail/9600000081032
