= Maison des lycéens =

French cultural association

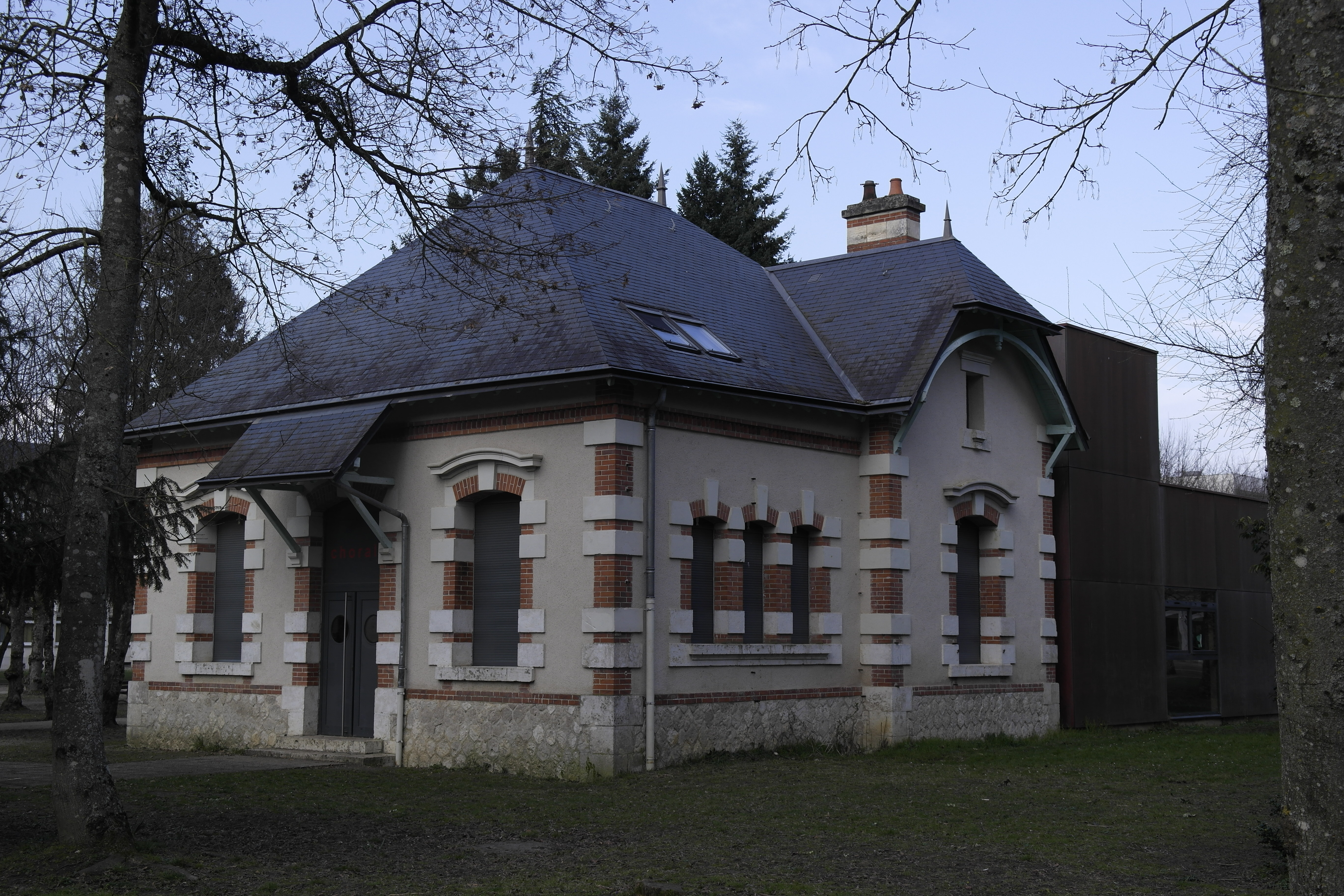
Old part of the Maison des Lycéens (MDL) at Augustin-Thierry High School

The Maison des lycéens (High School Students’ House) is a cultural association in French high schools that succeeded the former foyers socio-éducatifs (socio-educational centers). It is administered by students for the benefit of the student community.

The term refers to the student association typically present in every French high school. To promote collaboration among Maisons des lycéens (MDL) and establish a structured network, students founded the Fédération des Maisons Des Lycéen·ne·s (FMDL) on June 26, 2015. The FMDL offers training adapted to the needs of the MDLs and integrates them within the framework of popular education. It also develops collective solutions to common organizational challenges through a network of partners. To support local initiatives, the federation has established academic delegations responsible for organizing regional forums.

== Establishment: 1991 circular ==
The Maison des lycéens is a French association governed by the provisions of the 1901 Law on Associations. It was established to replace the former socio-educational center) in high schools while maintaining its educational mission as both a space for responsibility and creativity. The term foyer socio-éducatif continues to be used in middle schools. The creation of the Maison des lycéens was formalized by a 1991 circular, which aimed to adapt to two major developments: the lowering of the age of majority to 18 by the 1974 law, and the broader democratic evolution of students’ rights. Within this context, the Maison des lycéens was conceived as a central element in the recognition of students’ associative and participatory rights, codified by a 1991 decree. The circular defined three key characteristics for the organization.

1. Integration with the institution – The Maison des lycéens is intended to be integrated within the school, reflecting students’ requests for a dedicated space for meetings and social interaction. It is designed and equipped according to the preferences of students, within the limits of available material and financial resources. The association is managed by student administrators, while the school principal retains overall administrative responsibility.
2. Cultural and educational role – The Maison des lycéens serves as a key instrument for developing cultural and educational activities within schools. Its programs, organized by students, aim to encourage the dissemination of information among the student body. It may host meetings in its designated space or in other areas made available by the school administration. Discussions may address any topic of general interest, provided that diverse viewpoints can be expressed freely and that all activities comply with legal requirements and the fundamental principles of public education.
3. Student-led management – The Maison des lycéens is managed by students, and membership is open to all students of the institution. Its elected leadership—comprising the president, secretary, and treasurer—is entrusted to students who have reached the age of majority. The association is covered by insurance for all activities it conducts. It operates in coordination with the Conseil des délégués pour la vie lycéenne (Council of Delegates for High School Life), created in 2000, to ensure collaboration and avoid excessive overlap of responsibilities between the two bodies. Members of the educational community may, at the association's request, contribute their expertise in a cooperative capacity.

A 1992 circular specified the following points:

- The Maison des lycéens is a legal entity independent from the high school, and its activities are distinct from those of the EPLE administrators and the institution's governing board.
- Although its headquarters are located within the school, whether it receives subsidies or not, the Maison des lycéens must annually submit a moral and financial report to the president of the EPLE's governing board. The financial report must be certified by two auditors appointed during the association's general assembly and accompanied by a financial annex including key accounting data, such as changes in working capital and the financial balance sheet.

A 1996 circular concerning the status of school principals within extracurricular associations based in EPLEs explicitly excluded the Maison des lycéens from its scope, which continues to be governed by the April 1991 circular.

== Evolution: 2010 circular ==
Changes in the legal framework led to administrative adjustments regarding the capacity of minors within associations. The French Law of July 1901 on associations does not impose restrictions on minors, and the Civil Code allows them to serve as representatives. However, since 1971, the French administration, following the position of Interior Minister Raymond Marcellin, held that minors could not serve as presidents or treasurers of associations. The ratification of the International Convention on the Rights of the Child in 1990, which recognizes minors’ freedom of association, prompted a revision of this position. On November 24, 1995, a minor was elected president of the Maison des lycéens at Henri Bergson High School in Paris. The Associations Office of the Paris Prefecture validated the election, confirming that the international convention took precedence over administrative interpretation of French law. Subsequently, the Ministry of the Interior reminded prefectures that an association's registration could not be denied on the grounds that its founders were minors.

The February 2010 circular addressed the implications of these developments for the Maison des lycéens. It stated that lowering the minimum age for assuming responsibilities within educational associations from 18 to 16 years was a condition for recognizing and supporting student engagement, and that the participation of minor high school students in association management should be encouraged. This was further clarified in July 2011 by Article 45 of the Law on Alternating Education and the Securing of Professional Paths, which allowed minors aged 16 and older to hold administrative positions in associations with written parental consent. At the same time, the Ministry of National Education confirmed that insurers would cover the associated risks.

Furthermore, the 2010 circular introduced slight reformulations compared to that of 1991, which it repealed:

- Due to the challenges of providing dedicated meeting spaces within schools, the focus shifted from physical space to the encouragement and coordination of student initiatives more broadly.
- The Maison des lycéens brings together students who wish to participate in civic activities and assume responsibilities within the school in cultural, artistic, sports, and humanitarian areas. The circular also emphasized that the reform of high schools positions the development of student autonomy as a central objective of the new system.
- The Maison des lycéens may organize revenue-generating activities to support the association, including end-of-year events, alumni gatherings, or the management of a student cafeteria.
- The Maison des lycéens may also organize exhibitions, cultural trips, or participate in humanitarian projects in collaboration with social and cultural organizations.

In its March 2012 report, the Mission for Supporting High School Reform observed that, although students were generally very satisfied with the opportunity to participate in the Maisons des lycéens (MDLs), they often did not understand why, in a significant number of high schools, foyers socio-éducatifs (FSEs) continued to exist even though their elimination was normally provided for by the reform. The report also noted that the responsibilities legally available to students were, in practice, often inaccessible: positions such as president and treasurer of the MDLs remained primarily held by adults. According to the report, the resistance of some institutions to transforming FSEs into MDLs was largely motivated by a desire to preserve the financial reserves accumulated by the FSEs. Some school principals cited the absence of a decree implementing the law or the refusal of banks to open an account for an association administered by minors, interpretations that the report indicated were legally incorrect.

== See also ==
- Circulaire
- Juridical person
