= Circularity =

Circularity may refer to:

- Circular definition
- Circular economy
- Circular reasoning, also known as circular logic
  - Begging the question
- Circularity of an object or roundness
- A circularity ratio as a compactness measure of a shape
- An assumption of ANOVAs, with repeated-measures, often called "sphericity"

== See also ==
- Circular (disambiguation)
