= Phibunsongkhram province =

Former province of Thailand

Coordinates: 14°00′N 103°30′E

Phibunsongkhram จังหวัดพิบูลสงคราม
- Province of Thailand
- 1941–1946
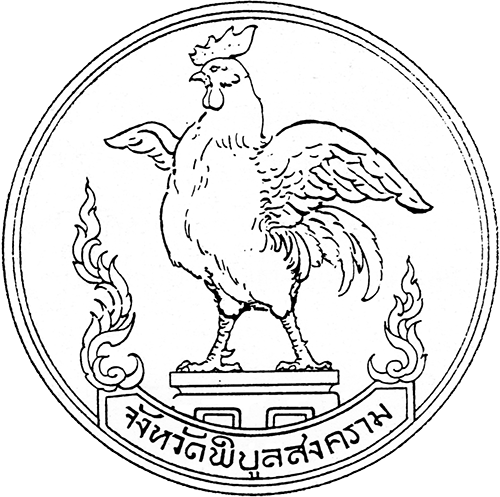
- Flag Coat of arms

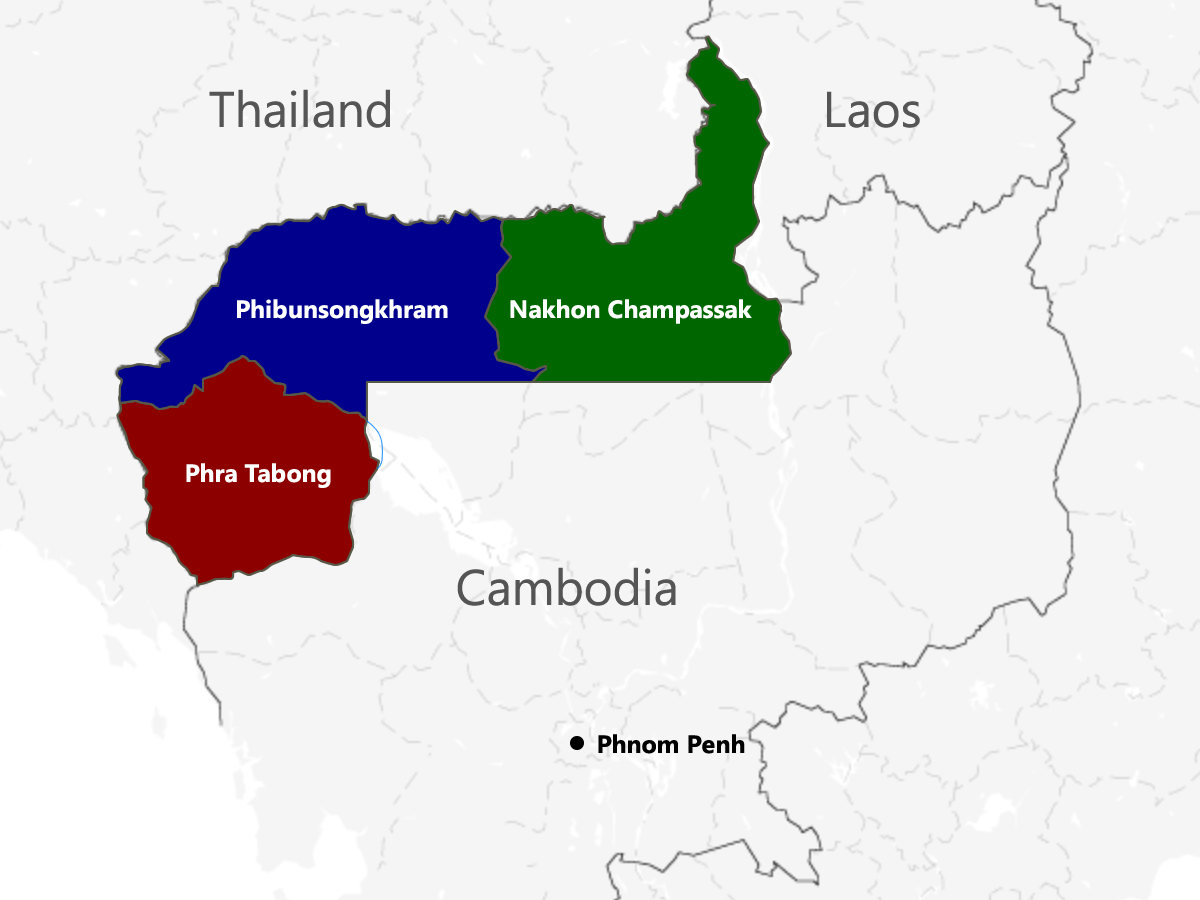
- Phibunsongkhram is shaded blue

Anthem
- Phleng Chat Thai
- Capital: Kalantha Buri (de facto)
- History
  - Franco-Thai War: May 9 1941
  - Thailand returns annexed territories to French Indochina: November 17 1946
| Preceded by | Succeeded by |
| French protectorate of Cambodia | French protectorate of Cambodia |
- Today part of: Cambodia

Map of Thailand's territorial losses, which were used as a justification for the annexation.

Phibunsongkhram Province (Thai: พิบูลสงคราม) was a province of Thailand that existed between 1941 and 1946. It was created as a result of the annexation of Cambodian territory by Thailand following the 1940-41 Franco-Thai War. The province was named after Plaek Phibunsongkhram. The province was dissolved and returned to Cambodia in 1946.

== History ==
The province was formed in 1941 after France ceded Siem Reap (excluding Siem Reap town and the Angkor Wat ruins ), Oddar Meanchey and Banteay Meanchey provinces to Thailand as a result of the Franco-Thai War. The province was dissolved in 1946 and returned to France after the post-war French government threatened to veto Thailand's entry into the UN.

== Administrative divisions ==
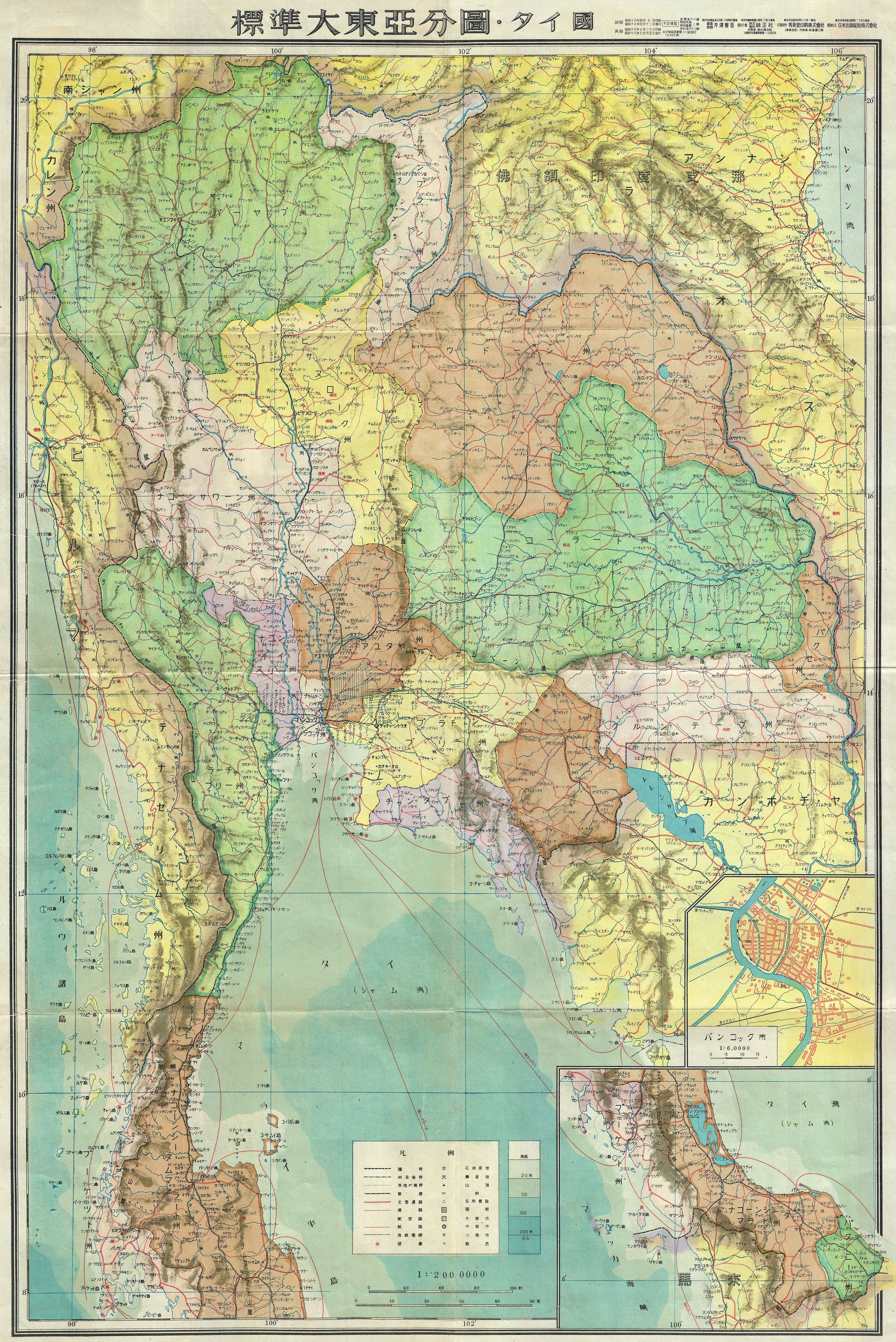
Map of Thailand during World War II in Japanese, 1943

Phibunsongkhram was divided into six districts (amphoe):

| | Name | Thai | corresponding to Cambodian |
|---|---|---|---|
| 1 | Phairirayodet | ไพรีระย่อเดช | Puok District |
| 2 | Kalantha Buri | กลันทบุรี | Kralanh District |
| 3 | Phrom Khan | พรหมขันธ์ | Chong Kal |
| 4 | Kriangsakphichit | เกรียงศักดิ์พิชิต | Samraong District |
| 5 | Wari Saen | วารีแสน | Varin District |
| 6 | Chom Krasan | จอมกระสานติ์ | Choam Khsant District |

== See also ==
- Japanese occupation of Cambodia
- Nakhon Champassak Province
- Phra Tabong Province
- Franco-Thai War
- Thailand in World War II
