= Phra Tabong province =

Former province of Thailand

Coordinates: 13°00′N 103°00′E

Phra Tabong จังหวัดพระตะบอง
- Province of Thailand
- 1941–1946
- Flag Coat of arms

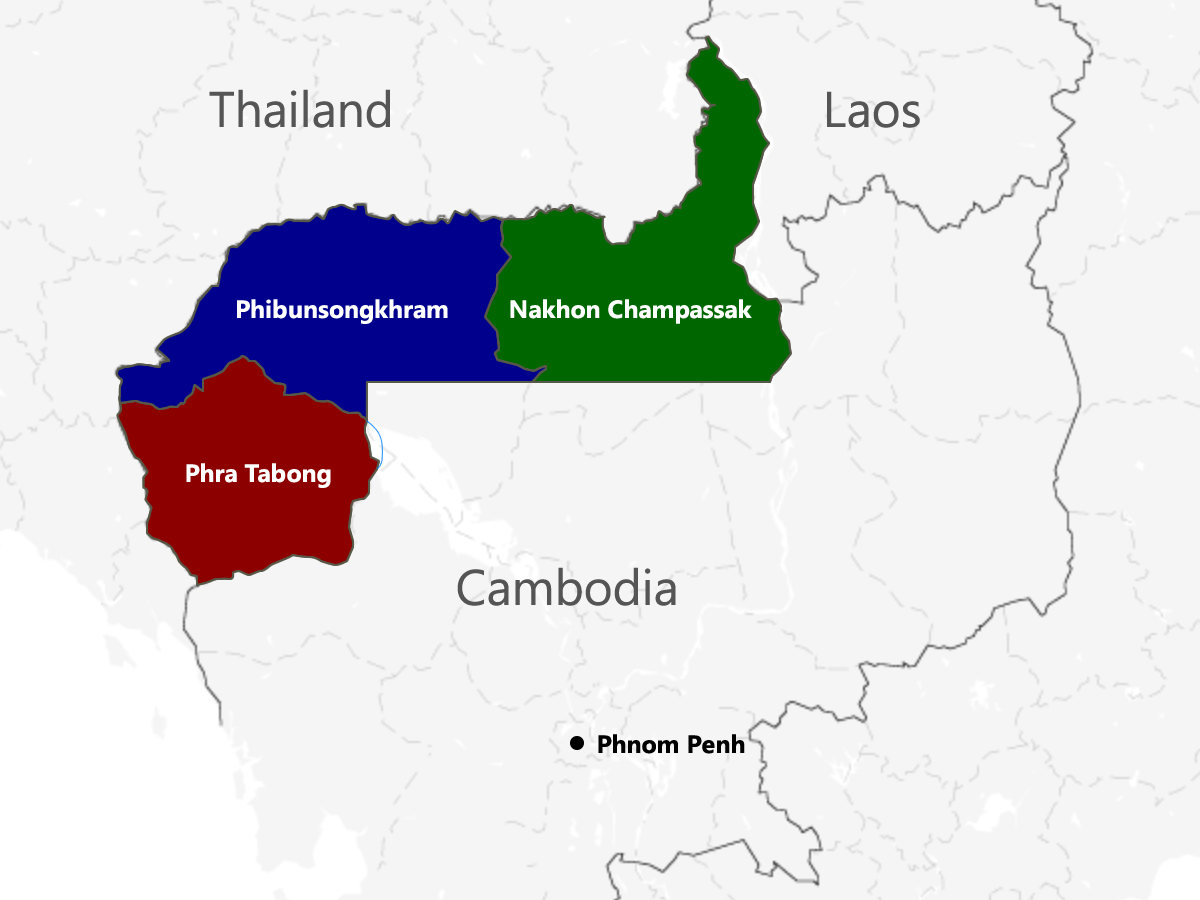
- Phra Tabong is shaded red

Anthem
- Capital: Mueang Phra Tabong
- History
  - Franco-Thai War: 1941
  - Thailand returns annexed territories to French Indochina: 17 November 1946
Preceded by	Succeeded by
Battambang Province	Battambang Province
- Today part of: Cambodia

Phra Tabong Province (Thai: จังหวัดพระตะบอง) was a province of Cambodia administered by the Thai government under Plaek Phibunsongkhram from 1941 to 1946. Its creation followed Thailand's annexation of Battambang during the Franco-Thai War in the context of World War II. The territory had previously been under Thai control from 1794 to 1907, before being ceded to French Indochina. After the end of World War II, the province was dissolved and returned to Cambodia in 1946. Today, the area formerly known as Phra Tabong province is part of Battambang province in modern Cambodia.

== Name ==
Phra Tabong (พระตะบอง) is the Thai version of the name Phraya Tabong Khayung (พระยาตะบองขยุง), the namesake of Battambang, who according to Khmer legend threw his staff from Angkor, landing in the area of modern Battambang.

== History ==
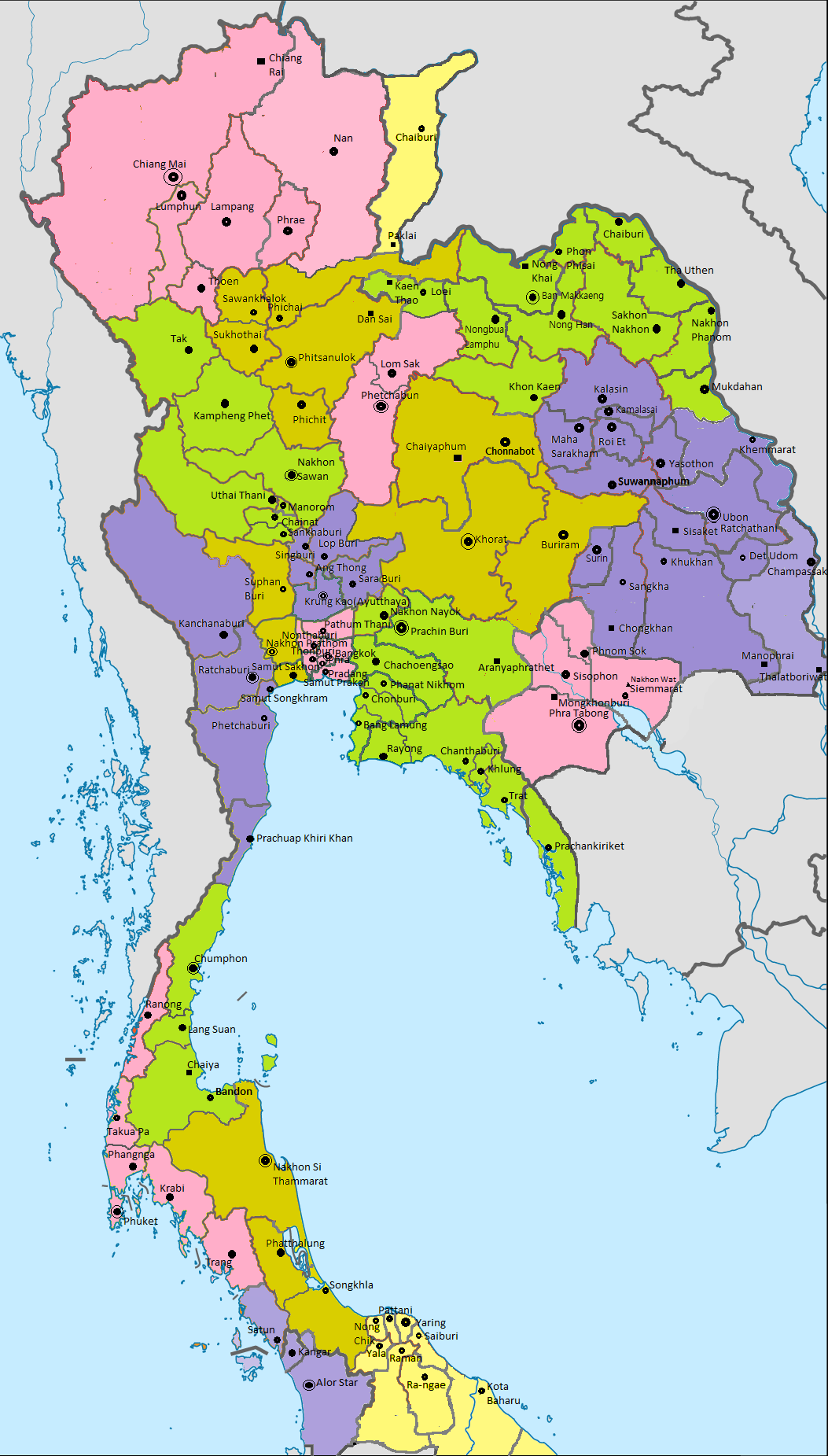
Map of Siam in 1900

Map of Phra Tabong as part of Siam in 1900

Though Siam had invaded this area of Cambodia at the beginning of the 15th century, Siamese administration of the area was only formally organized in the late-18th century, at the beginning of the Bangkok period known as Inner Cambodia or Khamen Suan Nai (เขมรส่วนใน). Baen Abhaiwongse, of the Abhaiwongse family, was installed as governor, with the title Chao Phraya Abhayabhubet. His family governed Phra Tabong as the provincial capital for another five generations, until 1907. In that year Phra Tabong, along with Siemmarat and Sisophon, was ceded to French Indochina in exchange for Trat Province and Dan Sai, in accordance with the Franco-Siam Treaty signed 23 March 1907.

In 1941, with the help of its ally, Japan, which occupied Thailand at the time, Thailand recaptured the areas it had ceded to France in 1907. The area in Cambodia had since been subdivided, and was rejoined to Thailand on 23 July 1941 as three provinces: Phra Tabong Province (with new boundaries, corresponding to Cambodian Battambang Province), Nakhon Champassak Province, and Phibunsongkhram Province (corresponding to Cambodian Siem Reap Province).

Thailand was forced to cede the territory again in 1946, after the end of World War II, as a condition for Thailand's admission into the United Nations.

== Administrative divisions ==
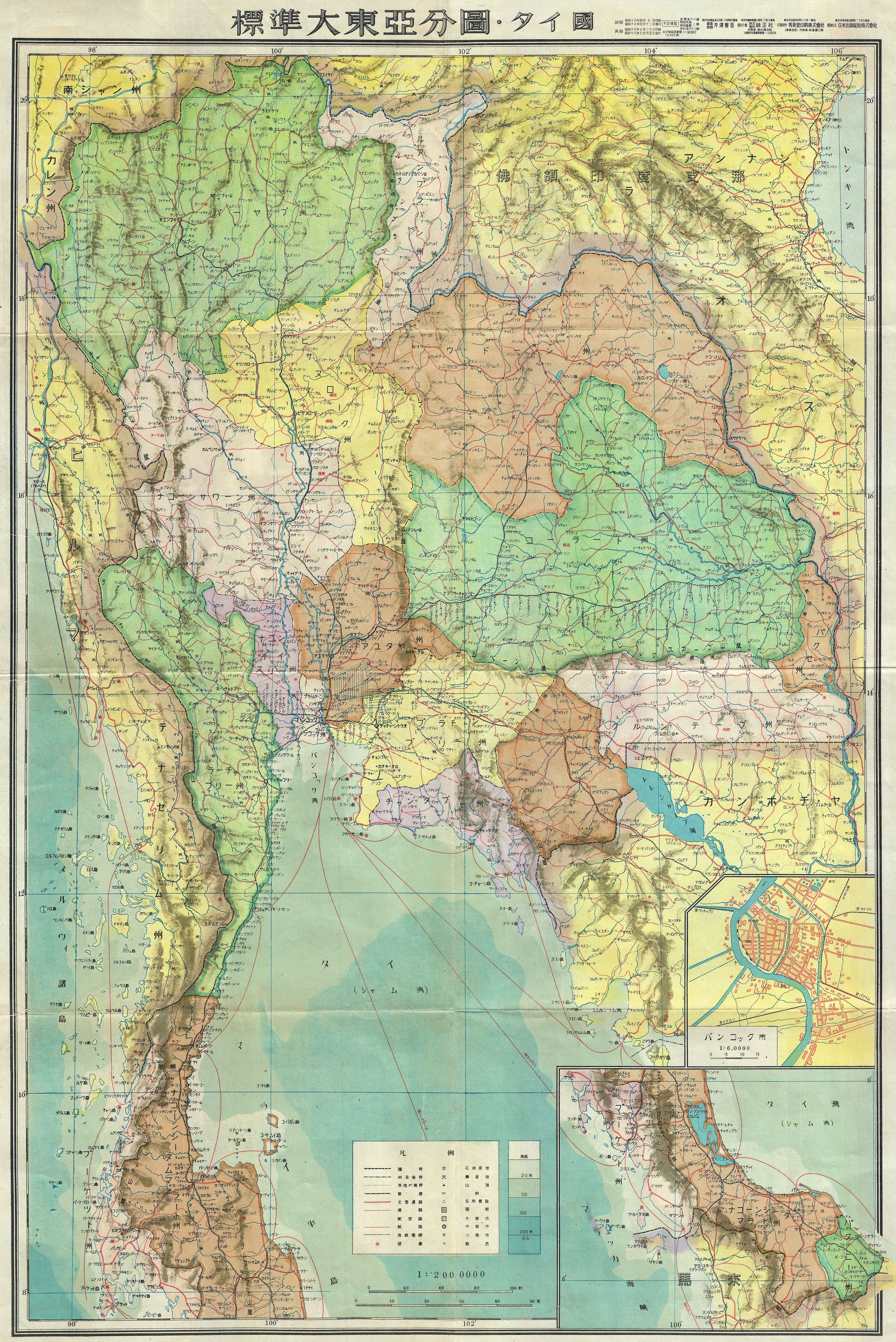
Map of Thailand during World War II in Japanese, 1943

When it was rejoined to Thailand on 23 July 1941, Phra Tabong was divided into seven districts (amphoe):

	Name	Thai	Corresponding to Cambodian
1	Mueang Phra Tabong	เมืองพระตะบอง	Battambang District
2	Phromyothi	พรหมโยธี	Sangkae District
3	Athuekthewadet	อธึกเทวเดช	Moung Ruessei District
4	Mongkhon Buri	มงคลบุรี	Mongkol Borei District
5	Si Sophon	ศรีโสภณ	Serei Saophoan District
6	Sinthusongkhramchai	สินธุสงครามชัย	Phnom Srok District and Preah Netr Preah District
7	Phailin	ไพลิน	Pailin District, now a municipality

Three of the former Cambodian districts were renamed to honor the military officers who led the three major divisions of the Thai armed forces in the French-Thai War:

- Phromyothi (Thai: พรหมโยธี) was renamed for Colonel Luang Phromyothi (common name Mangkon Phromyothi, later General), who commanded army troops.
- Athuekthewadet (Thai: อธึกเทวเดช) was renamed for Air Marshal Luang Athuekthewadet (common name Bunchiam Komonmit), who commanded airmen.

- Renamed in 1943 to Ronnaphakat (Thai: รณนภากาศ), after Luang Athuekthewadet quit his position.

- Sinthusongkhramchai (Thai: สินธุสงครามชัย) was renamed for Rear Admiral Luang Sinthusongkhramchai (common name Sin Kamonnawin, later Admiral), who commanded the fleet.

On 23 December 1941, Si Sophon and Sinthu Songkhram Chai were reassigned to Phibunsongkhram Province.

On 3 November 1942, Mueang Phra Tabong was established as a town (thesaban mueang).

On 17 September 1943, due to its small size, Phromyothi District was downgraded to a minor district (king amphoe) and renamed Pak Phraek (Thai: ปากแพรก). At the same time, four sub-districts from Mongkhon Buri District were combined into a new Phromyothi District.

=== List of governors ===
Governors of Phra Tabong Province
No.	Name	Period	Notes
1	Col.Luang Ranpatiwet (Wek Suwannakon)	1941	
2	Mom Dvivongs Thavalyasakdi (M.R.Chalermlap Dvivongs)	19 Nov. 1941-1943	Moved to be the chief advisor of the governors of Si Rat Malai
3	?	1943-1946	

== See also ==
- Japanese occupation of Cambodia
- Inner Cambodia
- Thailand in World War II
- Phibunsongkhram province
- Nakhon Champassak province
