= Syburi =

Malay state of Kedah during Thai occupation in World War II

Coordinates: 6°7′N 100°21′E

Sai Buri (Syburi) ไทรบุรี
- Province of Thailand
- 1943–1945
- Flag Coat of arms

- Map of Thailand's territorial losses, used as a justification for the annexation. Syburi is the territory marked as "1909", representing the year of its transfer to British rule.

Anthem
- Phleng Chat Thai
- Capital: Alor Setar
- History
  - Japan hands over Kedah to Thailand: 18 October
  - Thailand returns annexed territories to United Kingdom: 2 September
Preceded by	Succeeded by
Japanese occupation of Malaya	British Military Administration (Malaya)
- Today part of: Malaysia

Syburi (Thai: ไทรบุรี; RTGS: Sai Buri, meaning "City of the Banyan") is the name for the Malay state of Kedah returned to Thailand when the Japanese occupied British Malaya during World War II.

== History ==
Map of Syburi as a province in 1900

General Plaek Phibunsongkhram signed a secret agreement with the Empire of Japan on 14 December 1941 and committed the Thai armed forces to participate in the planned Malayan Campaign and Burma Campaign. An alliance between Thailand and Japan was formally signed on 21 December 1941. On 25 January 1942, the Thai government, believing the Allies beaten, declared war on the United States and the United Kingdom. As a reward for entering into a military alliance with the Japanese, the latter agreed to return to Thailand the four Malayan provinces ceded to the British in 1909, Kedah, Perlis, Kelantan, and Terengganu, as well as parts of Shan State in British Burma. In July 1943, Japanese Prime Minister Hideki Tojo announced that Kedah (along with Perlis, Kelantan and Terengganu) were to be returned to Thailand as part of the military alliance signed between Thailand and Japan on 21 December 1941.

From 18 October 1943 until the surrender of the Japanese at the end of the war, Kelantan, Terengganu, Kedah and Perlis were under Thai administration. On 2 September 1945, Kedah and the three other states were returned to the British.

People from Syburi have interacted with people from Phuket and Nakhon Si Thammarat and the result has been a number of marriages between Buddhists and Muslims.

== Administration ==
Administrative services were carried out by Thai civil servants who were under military supervision. The Japanese authorities retained a great degree of control.

=== Japanese Governors ===
- 1941 – Mar 1942 Ojama
- Mar 1942 – Oct 1943 Sukegawa Seiji (Seichi)

=== Thai Military Commissioner ===
- Oct 1943 – 1945? Pramote Chong Charoen

=== Thai General-Commissioners ===
Administering Kedah, Kelantan and Terengganu:

- 20 Aug 1943 – Oct 1943 Kamol Saraphaisariddhikan Chotikasathion
- Oct 1943 – 1945? Chierlah Kamol Sribhaasairadhikavan Josikasarthien

== Documents ==
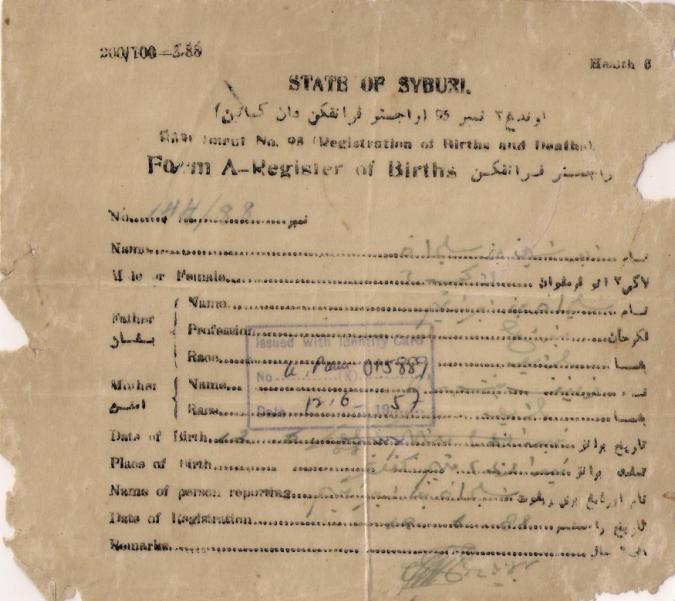
Registration of birth

== See also ==
- Japanese occupation of Malaya
- Anglo-Siamese Treaty of 1909
- Burney Treaty
- Thailand in World War II
