= Circulaire =

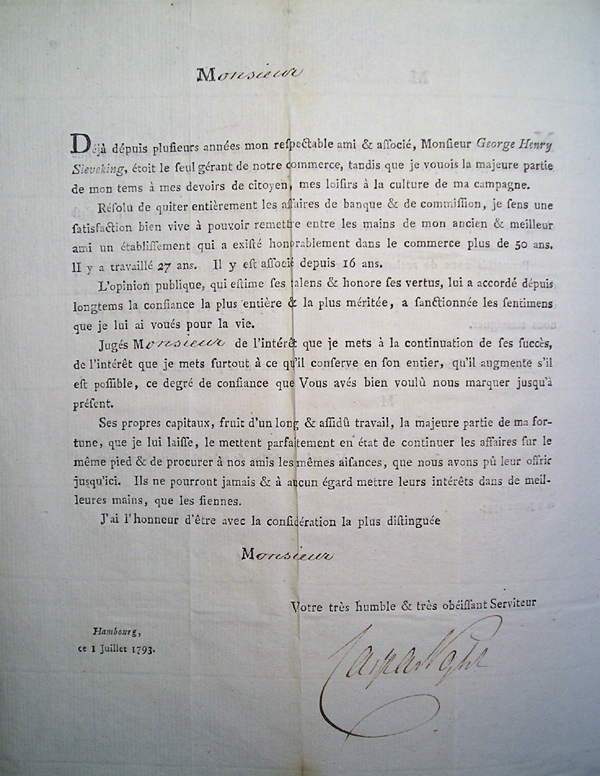

In France, Italy, Belgium, and some other civil law countries, a circulaire (French), circolare (Italian) or omzendbrief (Dutch) consists of a text intended for the members of a service, of an enterprise, or of an administration.

Within the French and Belgian civil service, a circulaire originates from a ministry with the aim of giving an interpretation of a legal text or of a regulation (a decree, arrêté or Royal Order), with a view to applying such a regulation consistently. As such, a circulaire depends on the general principles of law, but carries more weight than mere administrative acts.

Circulaire provide recommendations: they apply only to employees of the civil service. In certain cases, circulaires introduce new rules (circulaires réglementaires); such that under certain conditions one can appeal against abuse of power.

The body of jurisprudence relating to circulaires has developed extensively. In principle, circulaires exist only to comment on existing law and to explain its application in concrete terms.

The contentious side of circulaires, of notes de services and of instructions has brought about several legal responses, varying according to several criteria and according to the type of text involved:

- the regulatory nature of the text
- the character of the measure of internal administration
- the regulatory power of Ministers within their Departments
- Government decisions

== See also ==
- Circular letter (disambiguation)
- Maison des lycéens
