= Nakhon Champassak province =

Nakhon Champassak จังหวัดนครจัมปาศักดิ์
- Province of Thailand
- 1941–1946
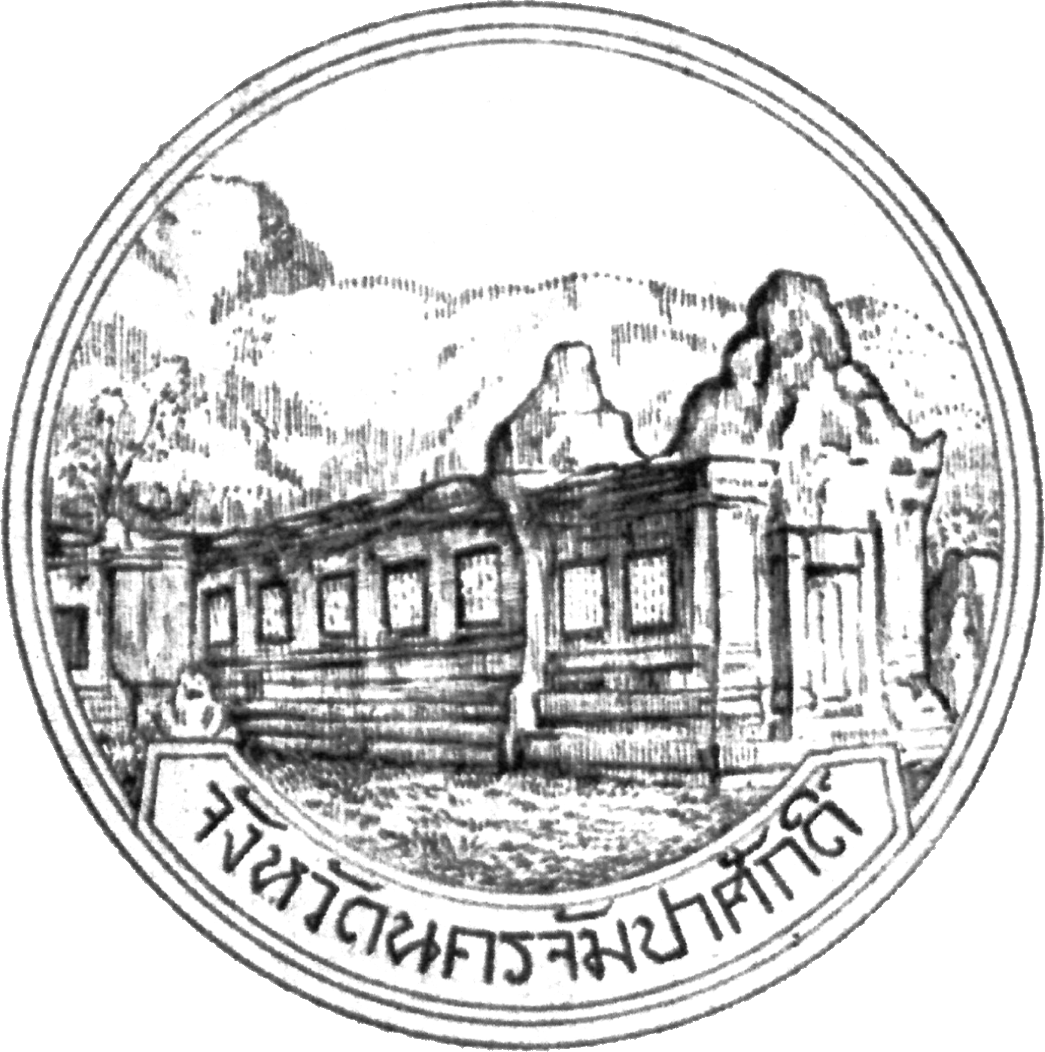
- Flag Seal

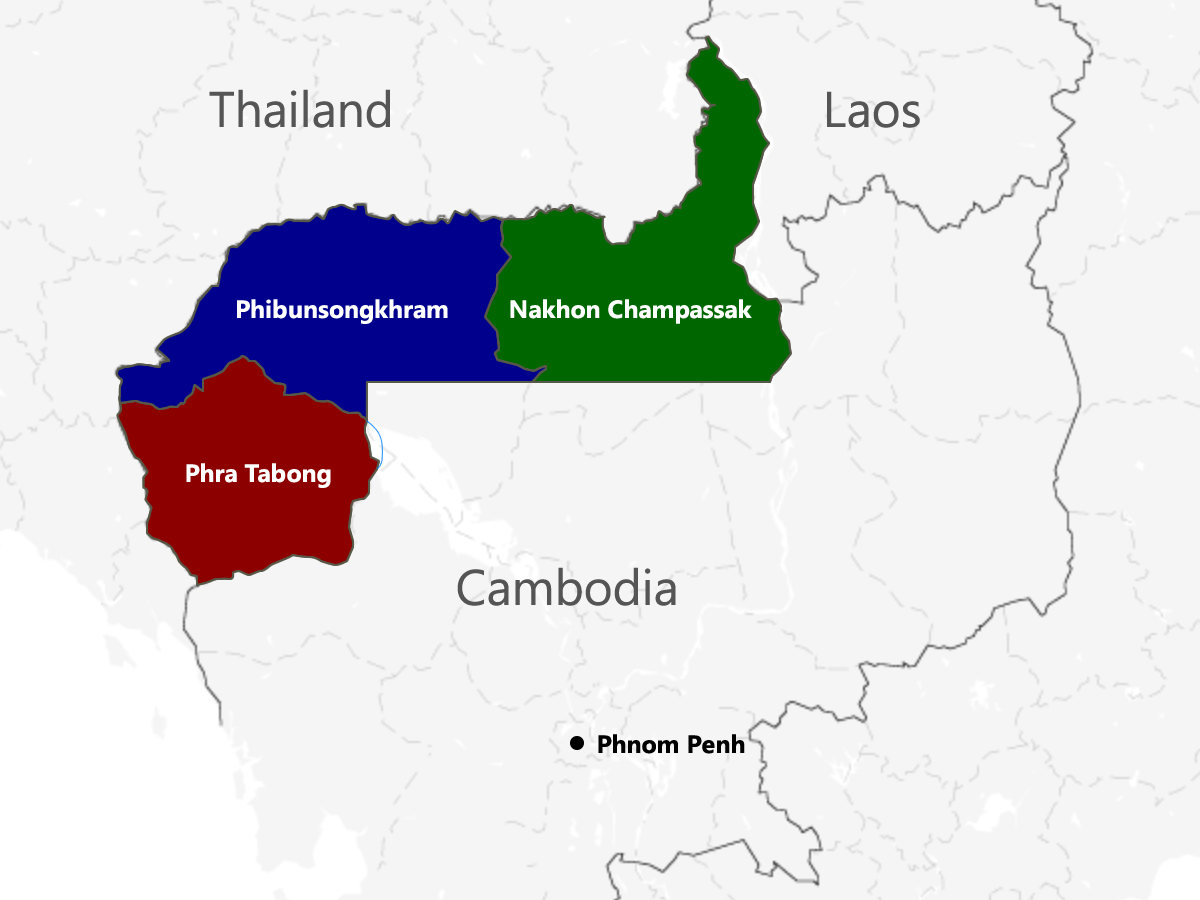
- Nakhon Champassak Province in green
- Capital: Champasak
- History
  - Franco-Thai War: 9 May 1941
  - Thailand returns annexed territories to French Indochina: 17 November 1946
Preceded by	Succeeded by
French protectorate of Cambodia; French Laos	French protectorate of Cambodia; French Laos
- Today part of: Cambodia; Laos

Nakhon Champassak Province (also spelled Nakorn Champassak; Thai: นครจัมปาศักดิ์; RTGS: Nakhon Champasak) was a former province in Thailand established in 1941 following the annexation of territories of French Indochina. The province was dissolved and returned to France in 1946.

== History ==
Nakhon Champassak was one of the provinces created as a result of the Franco-Thai War when Vichy France agreed to cede Meluprey and Thala Barivat province from Cambodia and the cis-Mekong part of Champasak Province from Laos to Thailand. The two sections were merged to form Nakhon Champassak Province. After World War II ended with the victory of the Allies, the post-war administration in France threatened to block Axis-aligned Thailand's admission into the newly formed UN. Finally in 1946 this province was dissolved and returned to France.

== Administrative divisions ==
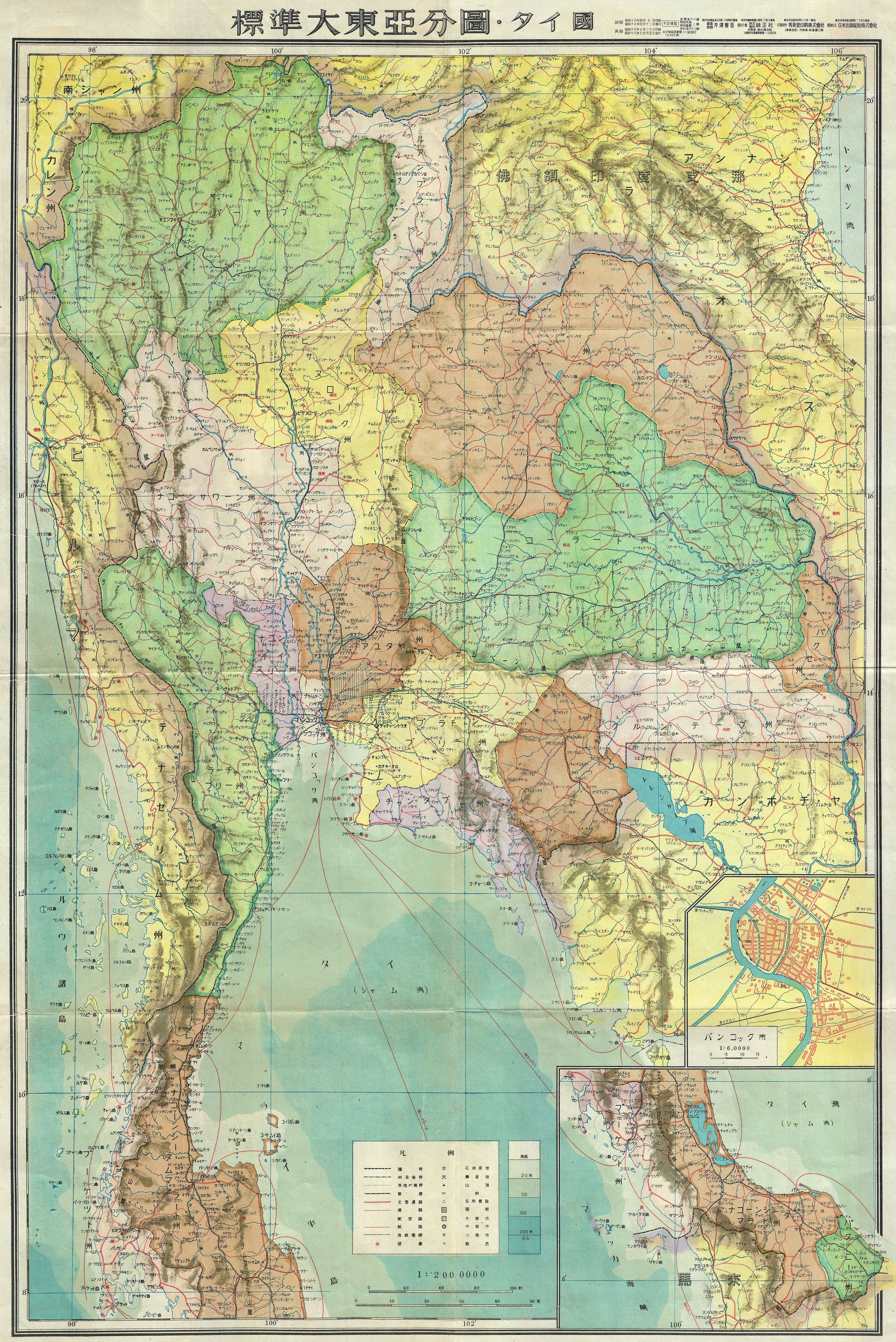
Map of Thailand during World War II in Japanese, 1943

Nakhon Champassak was divided into five districts (amphoe) and a minor district (king amphoe). The list below are the districts of the province. The one in italics is a minor district.

	Name	Thai
1	Mueang Nakhon Champassak	เมืองนครจัมปาศักดิ์
2	Wan Waithayakon	วรรณไวทยากร
3	Tharaboriwat	ธาราบริวัตร
4	Mano Phrai	มะโนไพร
5	Chom Krasan	จอมกระสานต์
6	Phon Thong	โพนทอง

== See also ==
- Lan Chang Province
- Phra Tabong Province
- Phibunsongkhram Province
- Franco-Thai relations
- Cambodian-Thai border dispute
