= Circular letter =

A circular letter or a circular may refer to:

- Circulaire, text broadly disseminated for the members of a service, of an enterprise, or of an administration
- Circular Letter (Interlingua), an early Interlingua publication
- Circular letter or encyclical, a letter written by a bishop and addressed to his clergy

== See also ==
- List of circulars
- Open letter
- Circular letter of credit
