= Juridical person =

Organization recognized by law as a fictitious person

A juridical person is a legal person that is not a natural person but an organization recognized by law as a fictitious person such as a corporation, government agency, non-governmental organization, or international organization (such as the European Union). Other terms include artificial person, corporate person, judicial person, juridical entity, juridic person, or juristic person. A juridical person maintains certain duties and rights as enumerated under relevant laws. The rights and responsibilities of a juridical person are distinct from those of the natural persons constituting it.

Since the beginning of writing at the start of recorded history, associations have been known as the original form of the juridical person. This is documented for the 1st century A.D. for Jewish trading companies. In Roman law, entities gained significance through institutions such as the state, communities, corporations (universitates) and their associations of persons and assets, as well as associations. At least three persons were required in Rome to found an association.

== By country ==
=== Brazil ===
The term juridical person (Portuguese: pessoa jurídica) is used in legal science for designating an entity with rights and liabilities which also has legal personality. Its regulations are largely based on Brazil's Civil Code, where it is distinctly recognized and defined, among other normative documents.

Brazilian law recognizes any association or abstract entity as a juridical person, but registration through a constitutional document is required, with specific requirements depending on the category of juridical person and the local laws of the state and municipality.

=== China ===
For a typical example of the concept of legal person in a civil law jurisdiction, under the General Principles of the Civil Law of the People's Republic of China, Chapter III, Article 36: "A legal person shall be an organization that has capacity for civil rights and capacity for civil conduct and independently enjoys civil rights and assumes civil obligations in accordance with the law". Note however that the term civil right means something altogether different in civil law jurisdictions than in common law jurisdictions.

=== Germany ===
Article 19(3) of the German Constitution sets forth: "Fundamental rights shall also apply to domestic artificial persons insofar as the nature of such rights shall permit."

=== Romania ===
In Romania, in most legal literature, there is a clear distinction between natural person (persoană fizică) and a juridical person (persoană juridică). When requesting or signing documentation, one must specify as what entity does the person wish to sign as.

== See also ==
- Algorithmic entities
- Corporate personality
- Corporate personhood
- Environmental personhood
- Legal person
- Person
- Person (Catholic canon law) § Juridic persons
- Maison des lycéens
