= HTMS Maeklong =

Royal Thai Navy escort vessel

Coordinates: 13°32′19″N 100°35′3″E

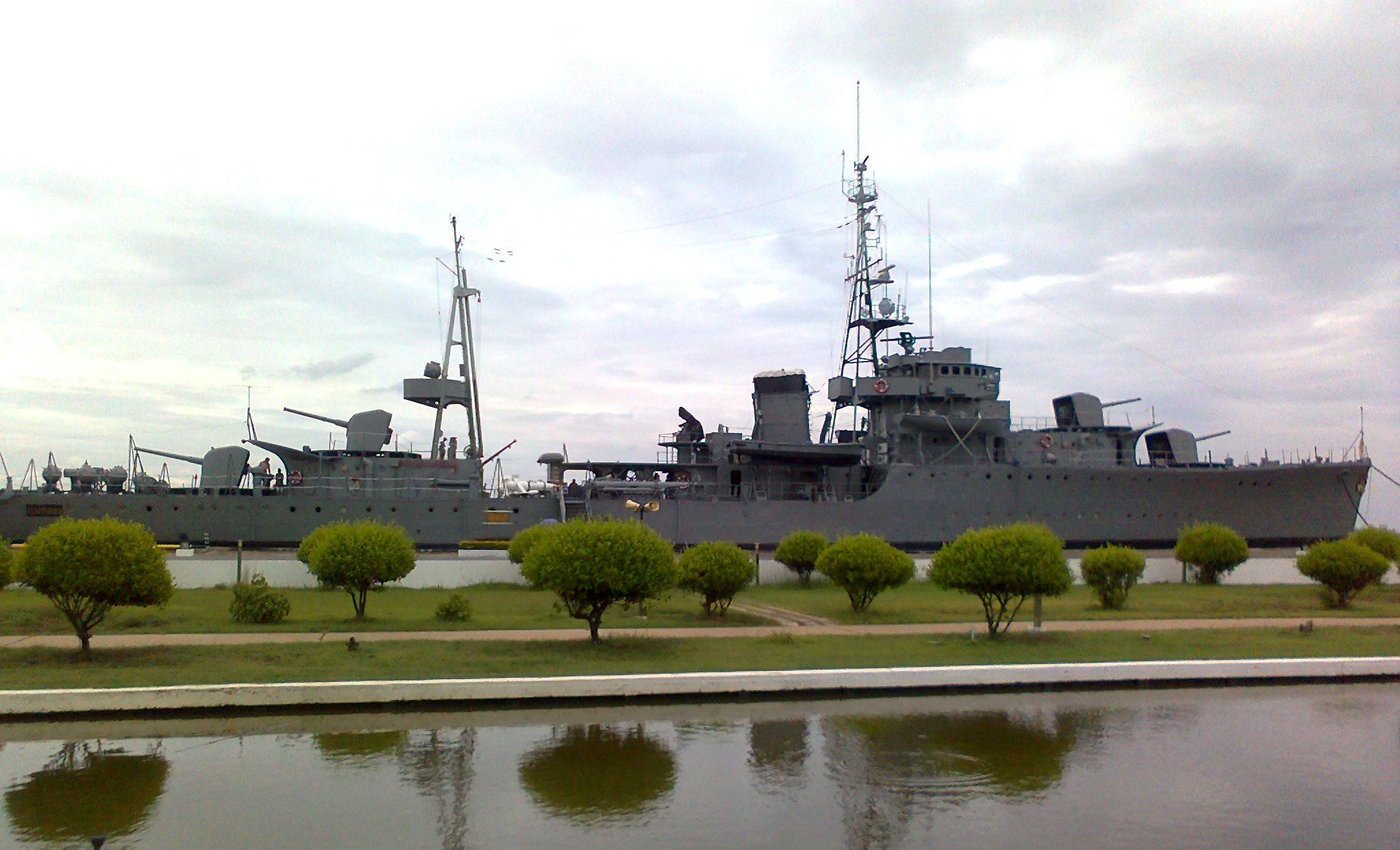
- HTMS Maeklong preserved as a museum ship at Chulachomklao Fort

History

Thailand
- Name: HTMS Maeklong
- Namesake: Mae Klong River
- Ordered: 13 August 1935
- Builder: Uraga Dock Company, Yokosuka
- Laid down: 24 July 1936
- Launched: 27 November 1936
- Acquired: 10 June 1937
- Commissioned: 26 September 1937
- Decommissioned: 20 July 1996
- In service: 26 September 1937 to 20 July 1996
- Home port: Sattahip, Chonburi
- Nickname(s): Teacher/Instructor Ship (เรือครู)
- Status: Museum ship

General characteristics
- Class & type: Mae Klong
- Displacement: 1,400 long tons (1,422 t)
- Length: 82 m (269 ft 0 in)
- Beam: 10.36 m (34 ft 0 in)
- Draft: 3.14 m (10 ft 4 in)
- Propulsion: 2 × reciprocating steam engines, 2,500 hp (1,864 kW)
- Speed: 17 knots (20 mph; 31 km/h)
- Complement: 173 (155 for training duties)
- Armament: 4 × 120 mm (4.7 in) guns; 1 × Twin Madsen 20 mm cannon; 4 × 45cm torpedo tubes (2 × 2); 2 × Type 80 Depth charge launchers; 2 × Type 70/80 Minelaying rails; 2 × Type C Minesweeping paravane
- Aircraft carried: 1 × Watanabe WS-103S

HTMS Maeklong (Thai: เรือหลวงแม่กลอง) is a retired Royal Thai Navy escort vessel (also classified as corvette or sloop) and training ship, built at the Uraga Dock in Yokosuka, Japan. Maeklong is the ship with longest Royal Thai Navy service with career spanning from 1937 to 1996. A veteran of both World War II and Cold-War. The ship was named after the Mae Klong river. Her sister ship from the same class was HTMS Tachin, also named after Tachin River.

After decommissioned in 1996 Maeklong is permanently preserved in concrete at Chulachomklao Fort in Phra Samut Chedi District, Samut Prakan Province, Thailand.

== Construction and commissioning ==
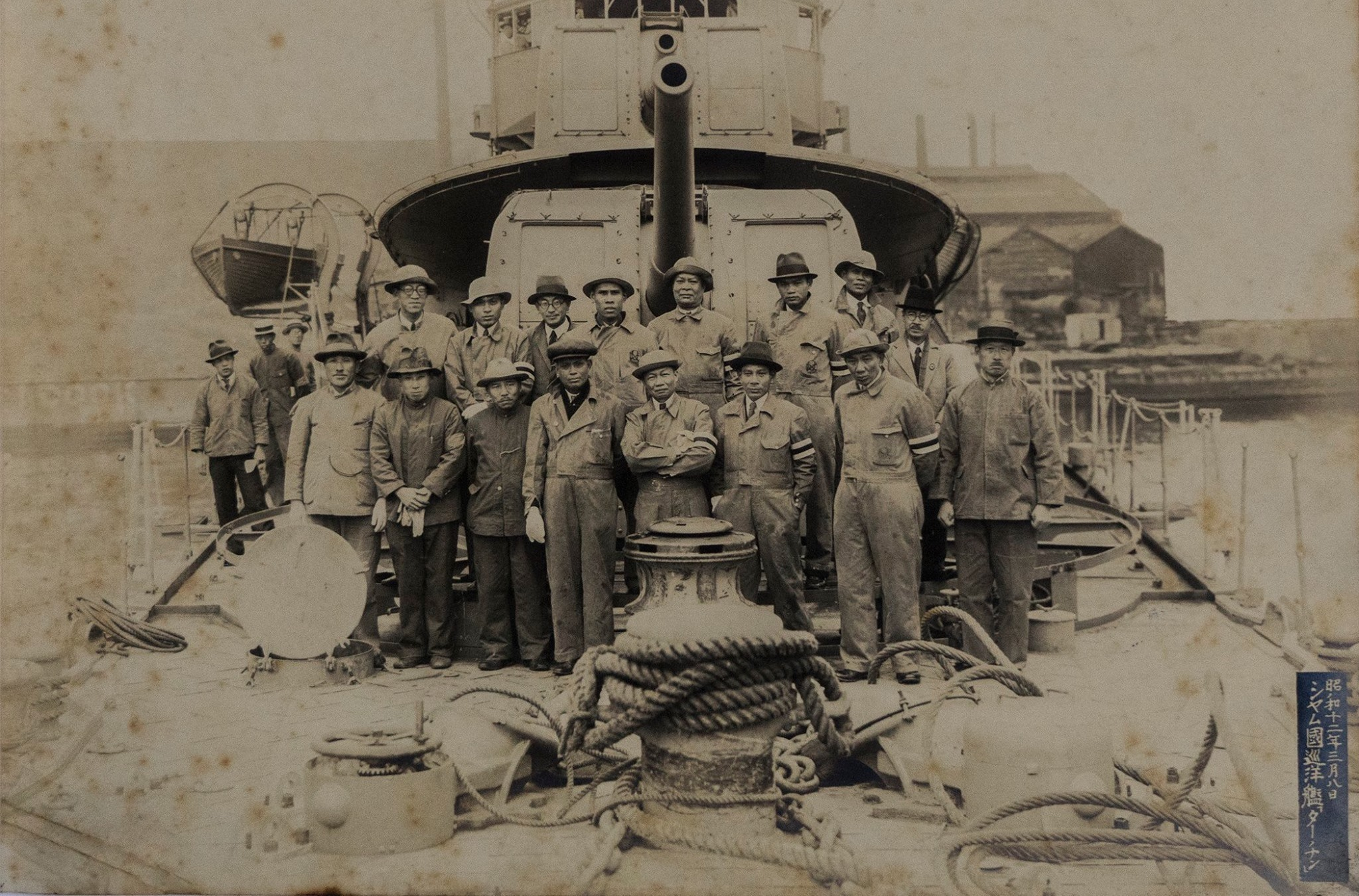
Commander Luang Chanchakrakij Chamanan at Uraga Dock Company, Yokosuka.

After the Siamese Revolution of 1932 the needs of modernizing Siamese Navy prompted naval staff officer Captain Luang Sinthusongkhramchai to propose a modernization plan to the Khana Ratsadon government under Phraya Phahonphonphayuhasena resulting in Naval Reinforcement Act of 1935 (พระราชบัญญัติบำรุงกำลังทางเรือ พ.ศ.๒๔๗๘). The plan consisted of 2 Heavy Gunboats, 2 training ships, 7 additional large torpedo boats, 2 Minelayers, 3 Small torpedo boats, 4 submarines, 2 troopships, 6 seaplanes and other necessary equipment.

Maeklong's construction along with four other warships (Sloops Maeklong and Tachin to be built at Uraga Dock Company, 3 small torpedo boats Klong Yai, Takbai, Kantang to be built at Ishikawajima) was ordered and signed between Royal Thai Navy and Mitsui Bussan Kaisha on 13 August 1935 with Captain Phra Prakobkollakij (นาวาเอก พระประกอบกลกิจ) assigned as the general overseer of all five warships while Captain Luang Chanchakrakij (นาวาเอก หลวงชาญจักรกิจ ชมะนันทน์) was assigned to oversee construction of Maeklong and Tachin.

Royal keel-laying ceremony for HTMS Maeklong was held on 24 July 1936 (same day as the launch of HTMS Tachin), at the Uraga Dock Company with Siamese ambassador to Japan Phra Mitrkamraksa (พระมิตรกรรมรักษา นัดดา บุรณศิริ) as the guest of honor, later the hull was launched on 27 November 1936. HTMS Maeklong has been delivered and sailed to Thailand on 10 June 1937 arriving at Ratcha Woradit Pier on 26 September 1937. The Ministry of Defense organized a welcoming ceremony and enrolled in the ship on the day the ship arrived in Thailand. At the ceremony Prince Aditya Dibabha (พระเจ้าวรวงศ์เธอ พระองค์เจ้าอาทิตย์ทิพอาภา), President of the regency council of King Rama VIII, presided over the ceremony at the Rajakij Winitchai Pavilion. Being commissioned in 1937 and served as training ship for naval officers until the age of 60. Maeklong is considered the longest active warship in the history of the Thai navy and one of the longest in the world.

The crew component of Maeklong consisted of 173 men divided into 13 commissioned officers, 9 chief petty officers, 85 officers and 66 seamen. Sometimes the crew component was reduced to 155 as a training vessel.

== Service history ==
World War II Service

During World War II, HTMS Maeklong mostly stayed between patrol career within the Gulf of Thailand. At the time of Franco-Thai War Maeklong and Tachin were assigned to the 2nd Fleet leading 2nd and 4th Naval Squadrons respectively in patrol missions between Sattahip-Ream-Prachuap Khiri Khan route but never engaged in any naval actions. Later during Japanese Invasion of Thailand Maeklong and Tachin were assigned by telegraph to maintain their positions at Ko Phai, Chonburi. In 1941 the seaplane storage area and side torpedo tubes were replaced with 3 Japanese-made 40mm "Type BI" anti-aircraft gun mounts. (Two single mount in place of each side torpedo tubes while the twin gun mount replaced the aircraft storage.) Later in the war, Maeklong's sister ship Tachin was attacked and heavily damaged by the British B-24 Liberator from No. 99 Squadron RAF and No. 159 Squadron RAF raid on 1 June 1945 at Sattahip Bay thus ending her career with 53 wounded sailors.

Post-War Service

After World War II, Maeklong would receive more upgrades in the form of 20mm Oerlikon, Bofors 40mm L/60 and the replacement of all four Japanese main guns to American 3-inch/50-caliber naval guns during her Post-War service until her retirement in 1996. Her first refit was done in 1951 with all Japanese 40mm Type-BI autocannons and her twin Madsen turret replaced by three single Oerlikon 20mm and three single Bofors L/60 gun mounts, a marine navigation radar was also installed at this point in time. In her second refit of 1973, her main gun was changed to an American 3-inch Mk.22 gun.

All American-made weapons were uninstalled and replaced with her original Japanese and Danish weapons when Maeklong was adapted for ground monument role at Chulachomklao Fort. Her original side torpedo tubes were also installed back onto the ship. It is unknown for the surviving 40mm Type-BI guns (both single and twin mounts) displayed at Chulachomklao Fort either belongs to Maeklong, Tachin or other ships upgraded with the Japanese equipment during the World War II.

As a royal ship

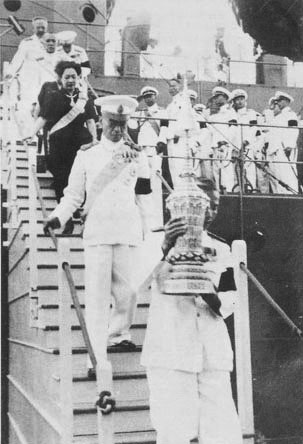
Queen Rambhai Barni and naval officers transporting the royal ash of King Prajadhipok from HTMS Maeklong at Tha Ratchaworadit, Bangkok, 20 May 1948.

She was used as a royal ship for many occasions, for example, when King Rama VIII (King Ananda Mahidol) and his younger brother King Rama IX (then Prince Bhumibol) went to study in Lausanne, Switzerland on 13 January 1938. Later Maeklong was chosen as a ship to bring the royal ash of exiled-King Prajadhipok (Rama VII) from London to Tha Ratchaworadit, Bangkok by Queen Rambhai Barni on 20 May 1949. Another trip was made aboard Maeklong by King Bhumibol returning to Bangkok on 2 December 1951 after he finished his studies in Switzerland. (He shortly returned to Thailand after World War II with his brother but returned to Switzerland for further studies.) During the Cold War Maeklong was used in royal proceedings for King Bhumibol reviewing the Naval Parade and observing the landing of the marines at Bang Saen Beach, Chon Buri Province on 20 November 1954, also dubbed as Thai Navy Day.

== HTMS Maeklong Museum ==
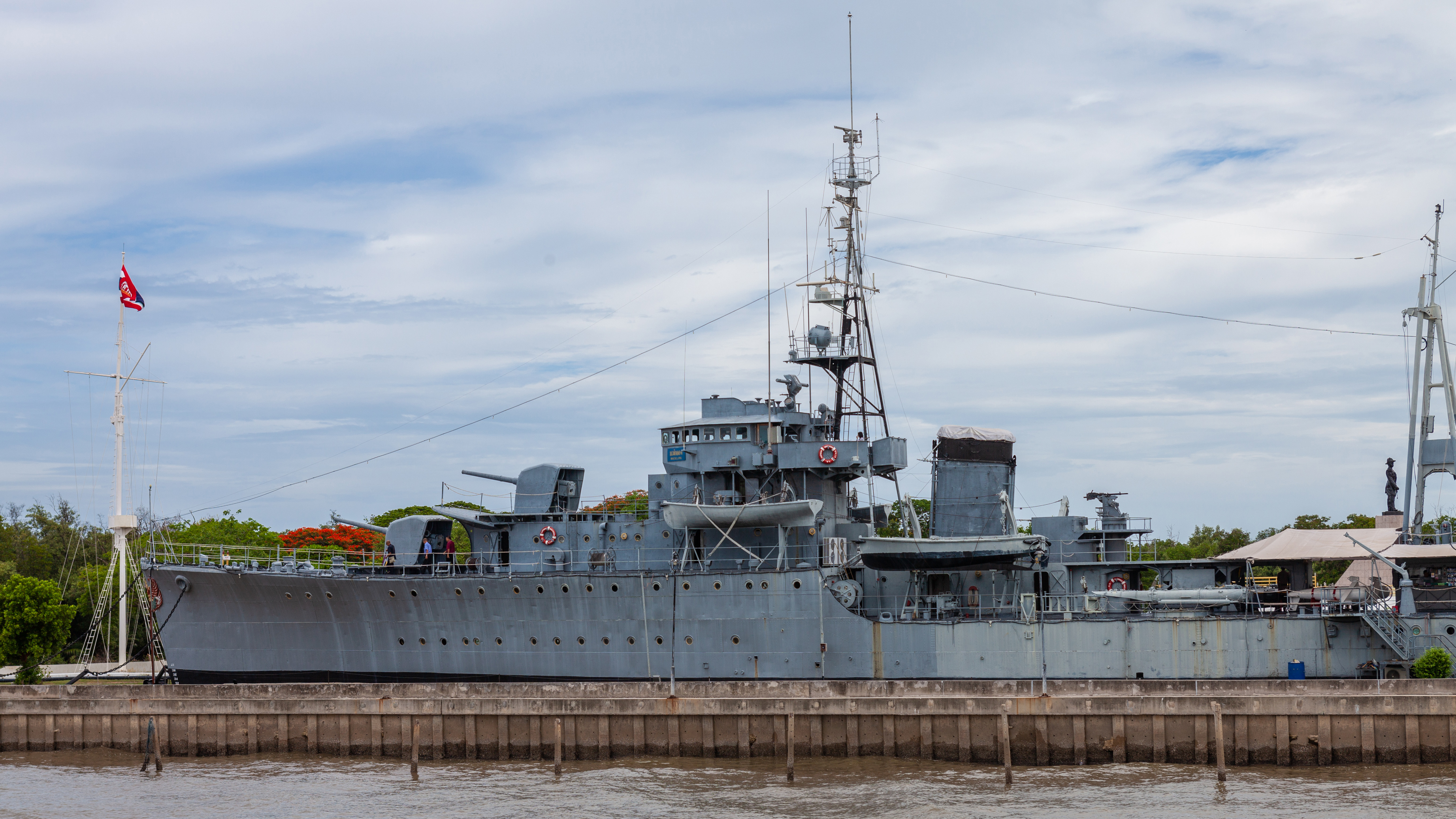
HTMS Maeklong on display

Later, King Bhumibol Adulyadej asked the Royal Thai Navy about preserving old warships and turning them into a museum of military history to disseminate knowledge to the public. Therefore, in the auspicious occasion of King Bhumibol's 50th anniversary of his ascension to the throne in 1996, the Royal Thai Navy built the Thai Warship Museum in honor of his Golden Jubilee by conserving HTMS Mae Klong and made her a museum ship in the navy's outdoor museum project at Chulachomklao Fort in Phra Samut Chedi District, Samut Prakan Province.

== Gallery ==
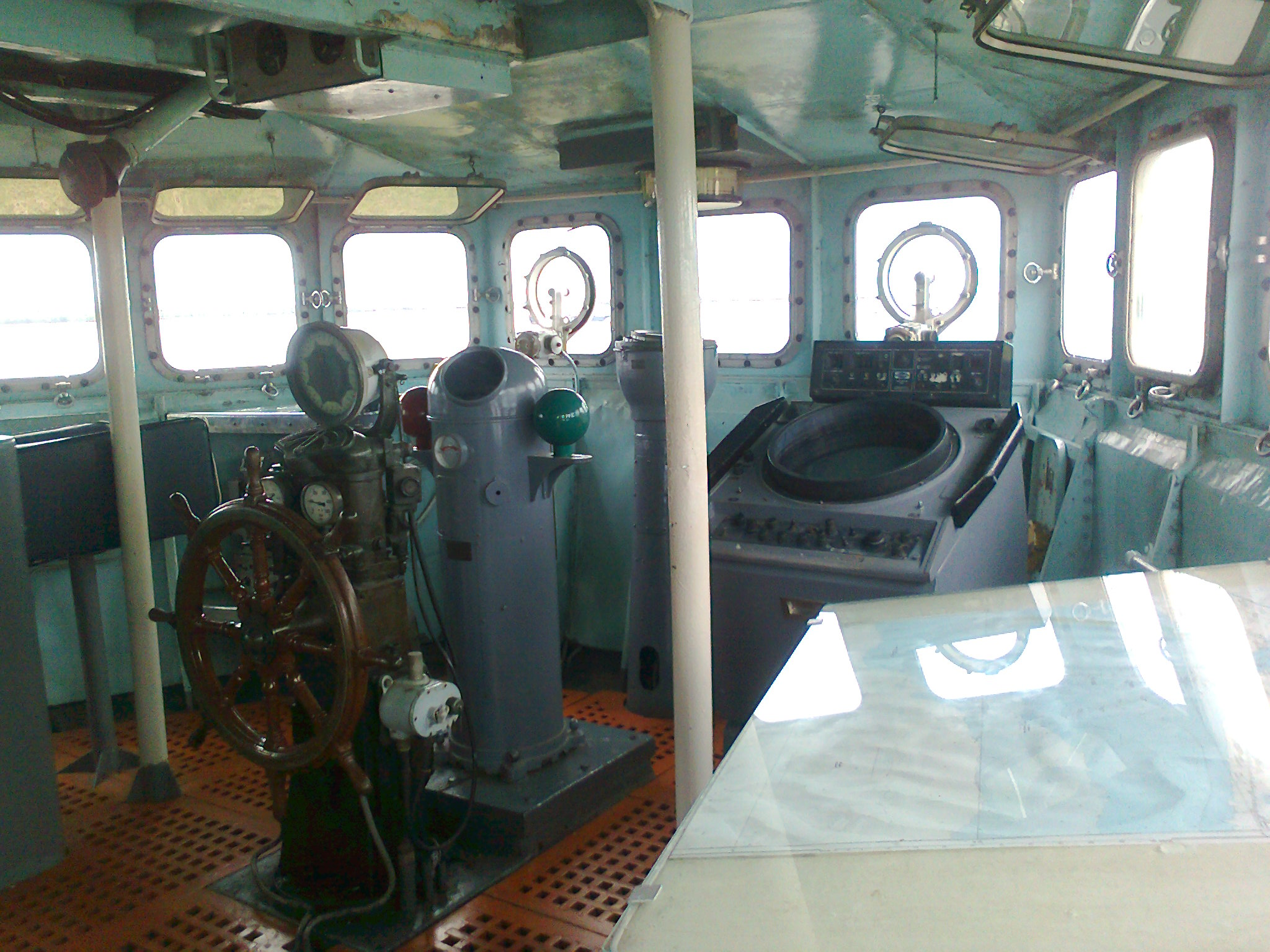
Command Bridge of HTMS Maeklong

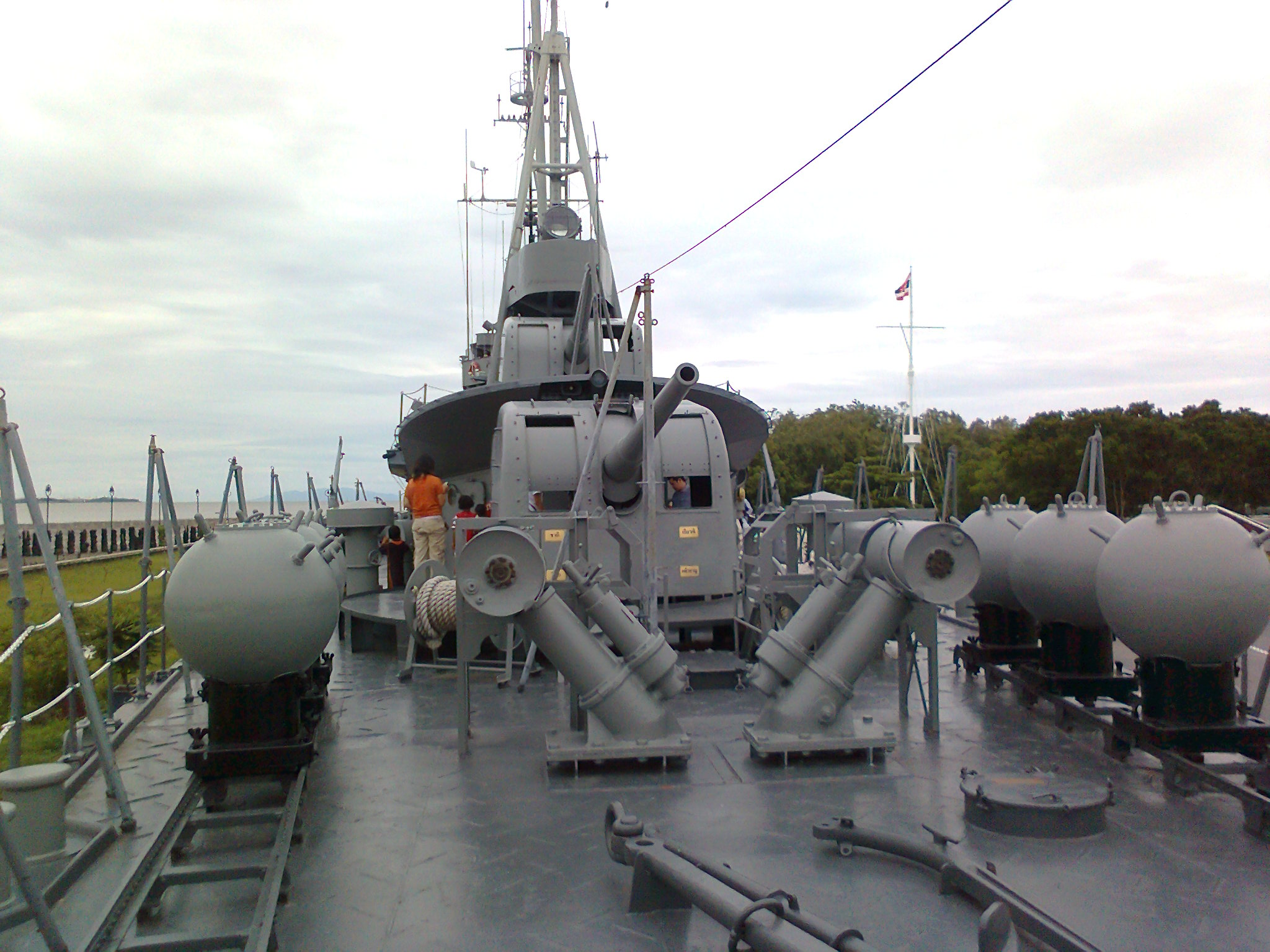
On the HTMS Maeklong

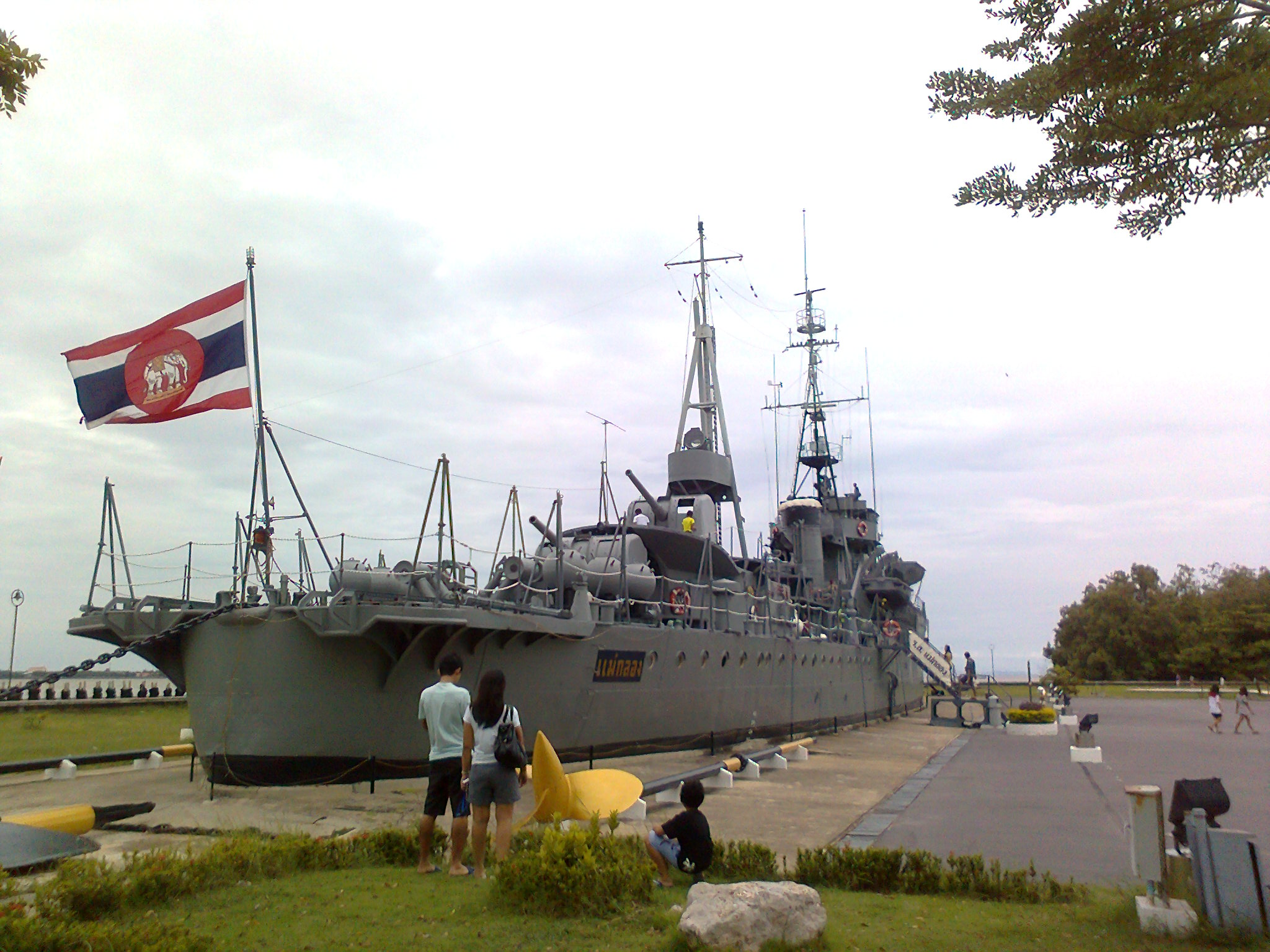
Stern of HTMS Maeklong

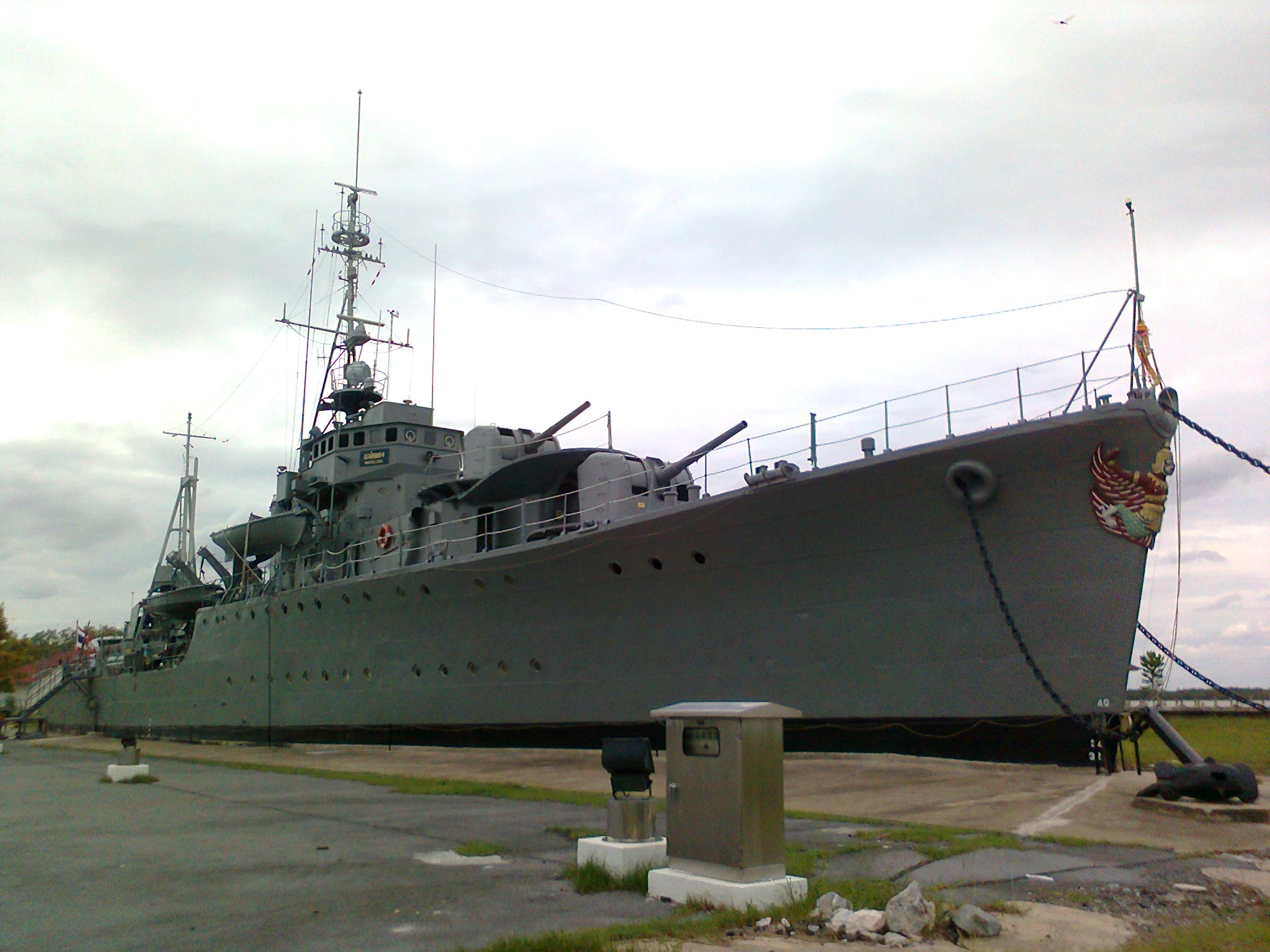
As museum ship in 2012

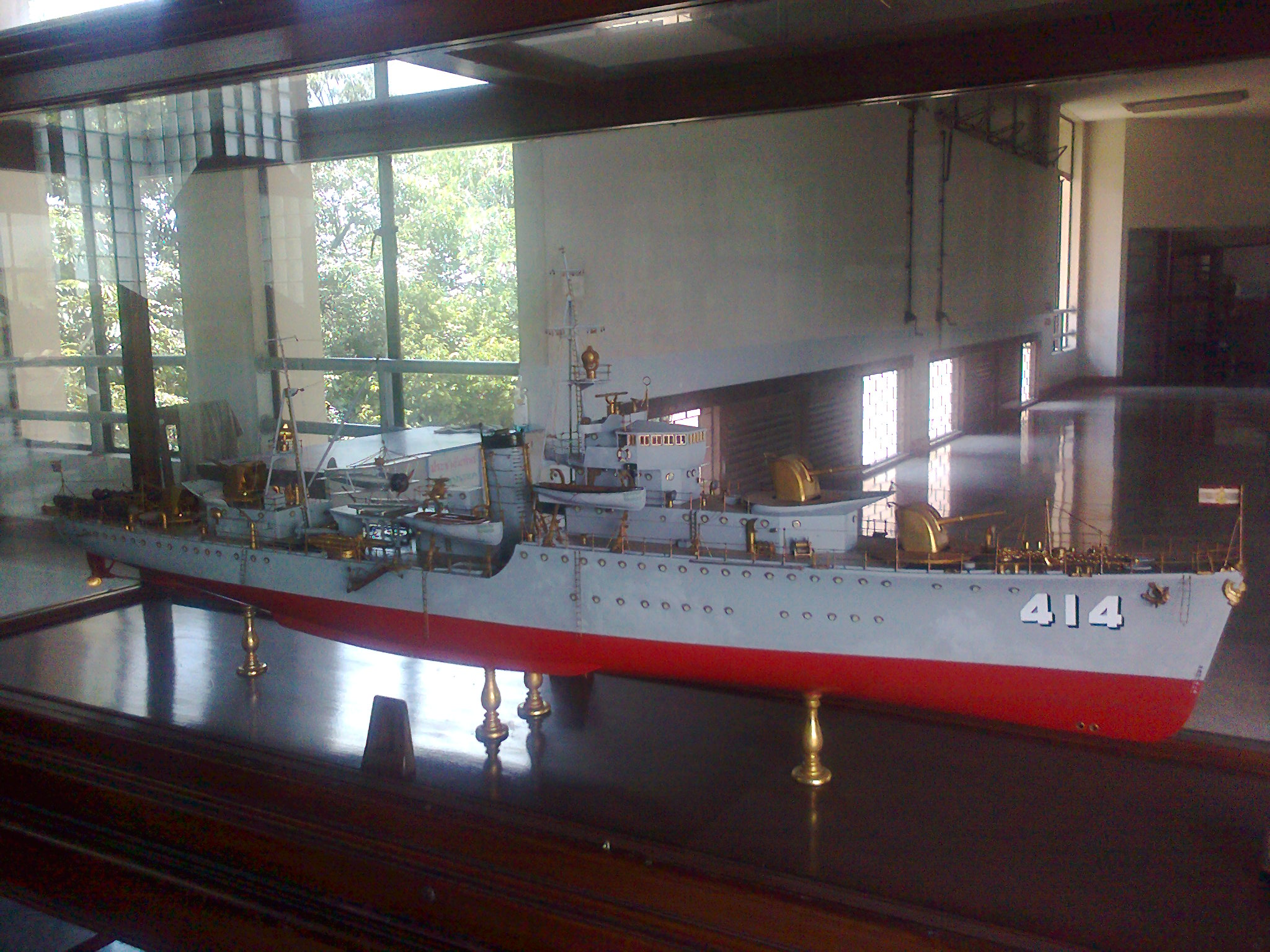
Model of HTMS Maeklong

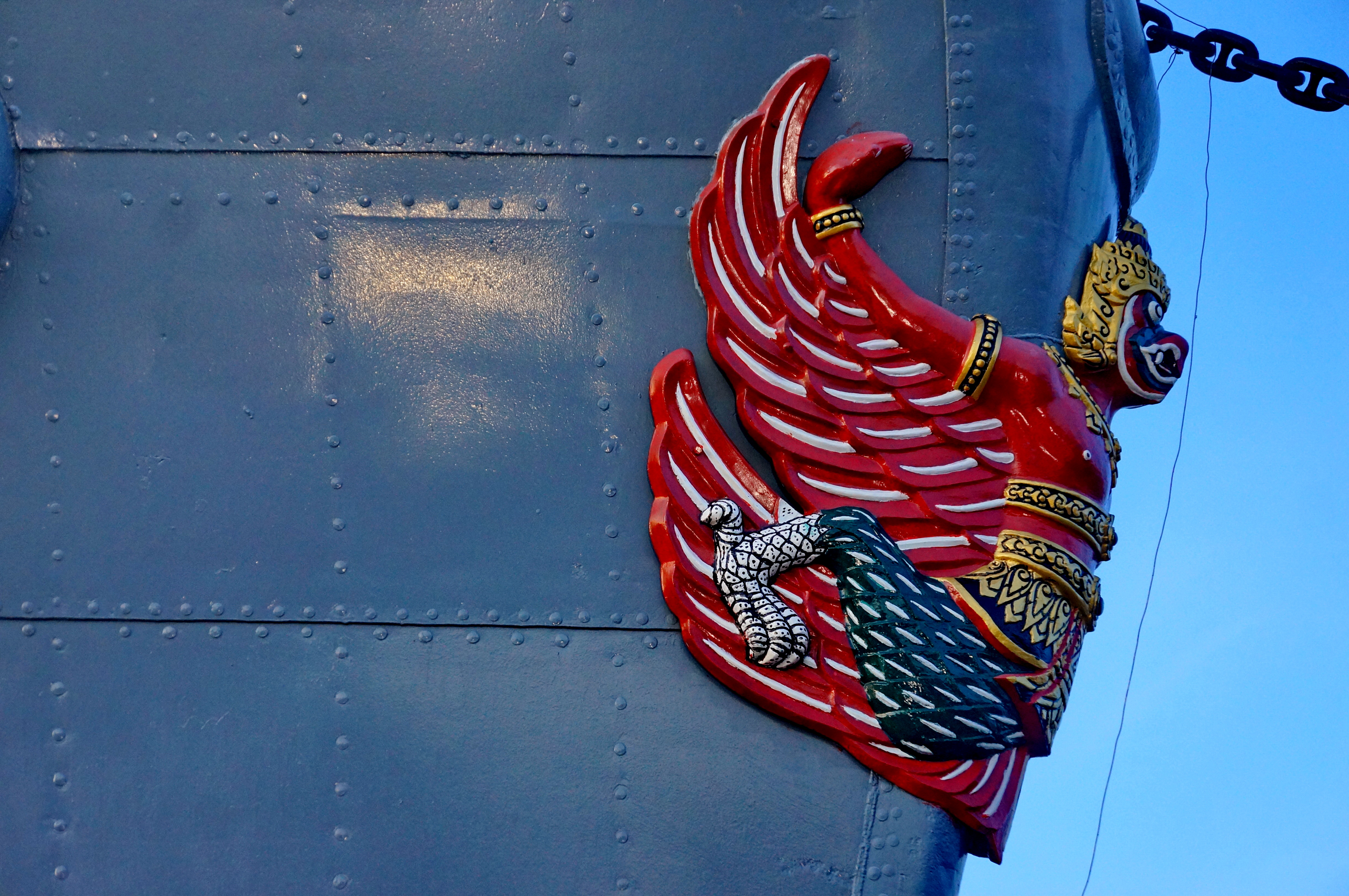
Garuda figurehead of HTMS Maeklong (Side view)

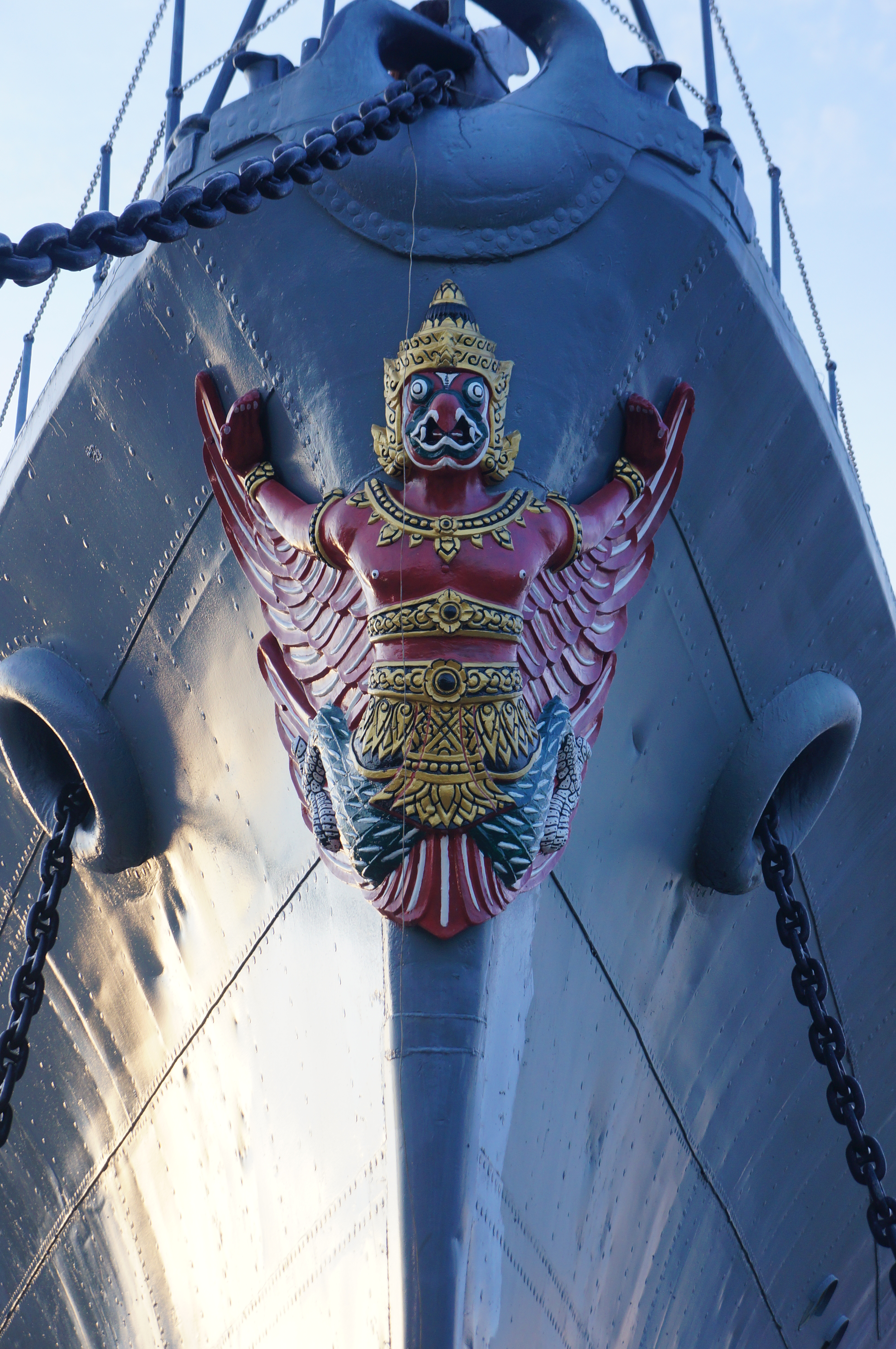
Garuda figurehead of HTMS Maeklong (Front view)
