= HTMS Tachin =

HTMS Tachin is the name of the following ships of the Royal Thai Navy:

- HTMS Tachin (1936), a sloop-of-war and training ship, decommissioned in 1945 after battle damage during WWII
- HTMS Tachin (PF-1), ex-USS Glendale, a Tacoma-class patrol frigate acquired in 1951, decommissioned in 2000

== See also ==
- Tachin
