= HTMS Tachin (1936) =

Royal Thai Navy escort vessel

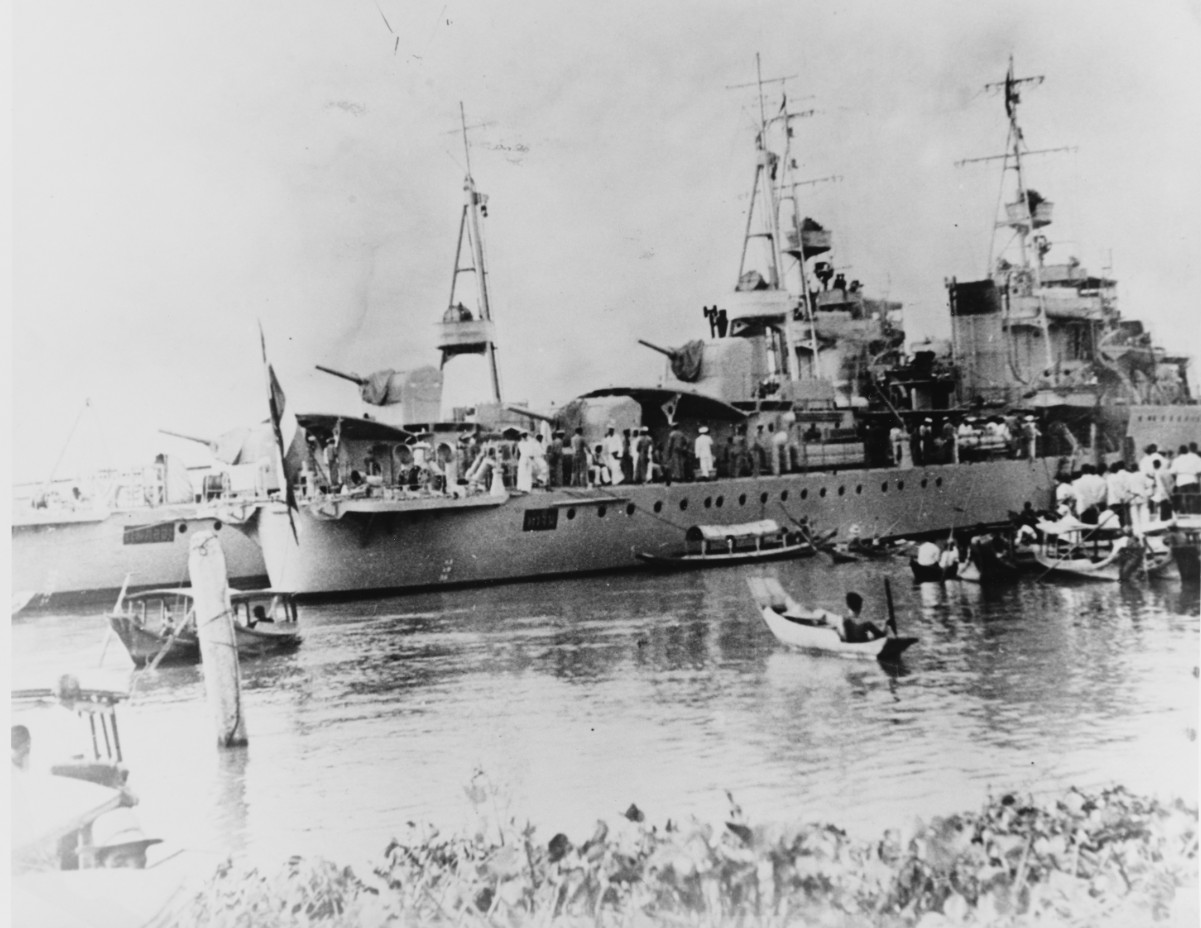
- Tachin and her sister ship Maeklong

History

Thailand
- Name: HTMS Tachin
- Namesake: Tha Chin River
- Ordered: 13 August 1935
- Builder: Uraga Dock Company, Yokosuka
- Launched: 24 July 1936
- Commissioned: 26 September 1937
- Decommissioned: June 1945
- In service: 26 September 1937 to 1 June 1945
- Home port: Sattahip, Chonburi
- Fate: Heavily damaged by B-24 from No. 99 Squadron RAF and No. 159 Squadron RAF air raid on 1 June 1945.

General characteristics
- Class & type: Mae Klong
- Displacement: 1,400 long tons (1,422 t)
- Length: 85 m (279 ft)
- Beam: 10.5 m (34 ft)
- Draft: 3.7 m (12 ft)
- Propulsion: 2 × reciprocating steam engines, 2,500 hp (1,864 kW)
- Speed: 17 knots (20 mph; 31 km/h)
- Complement: 173 (155 for training duties)
- Armament: 4 × 120 mm (4.7 in) guns; 1 × Twin Madsen 20 mm cannon; 2 × Single 40mm Type-BI Anti-Aircraft Gun; 1 × Twin 40mm Type-BI Anti-Aircraft Gun; 4 × 45cm torpedo tubes (2 × 2); 6 × Depth charge launchers; 2 × Minelaying rails
- Aircraft carried: 1 × Watanabe WS-103S

HTMS Tachin (Thai: เรือหลวงท่าจีน) was a Royal Thai Navy sloop and training ship, built by the Japanese Uraga Dock Company in Yokosuka, Japan. Her sister ship was HTMS Maeklong. The ship is named after Tha Chin River and served alongside HTMS Maeklong on training and wartime duties. HTMS Tachin was sunk during World War II from the British Royal Air Force air raid at Sattahip Bay, Chonburi on 1 June 1945.

== Construction and commissioning ==
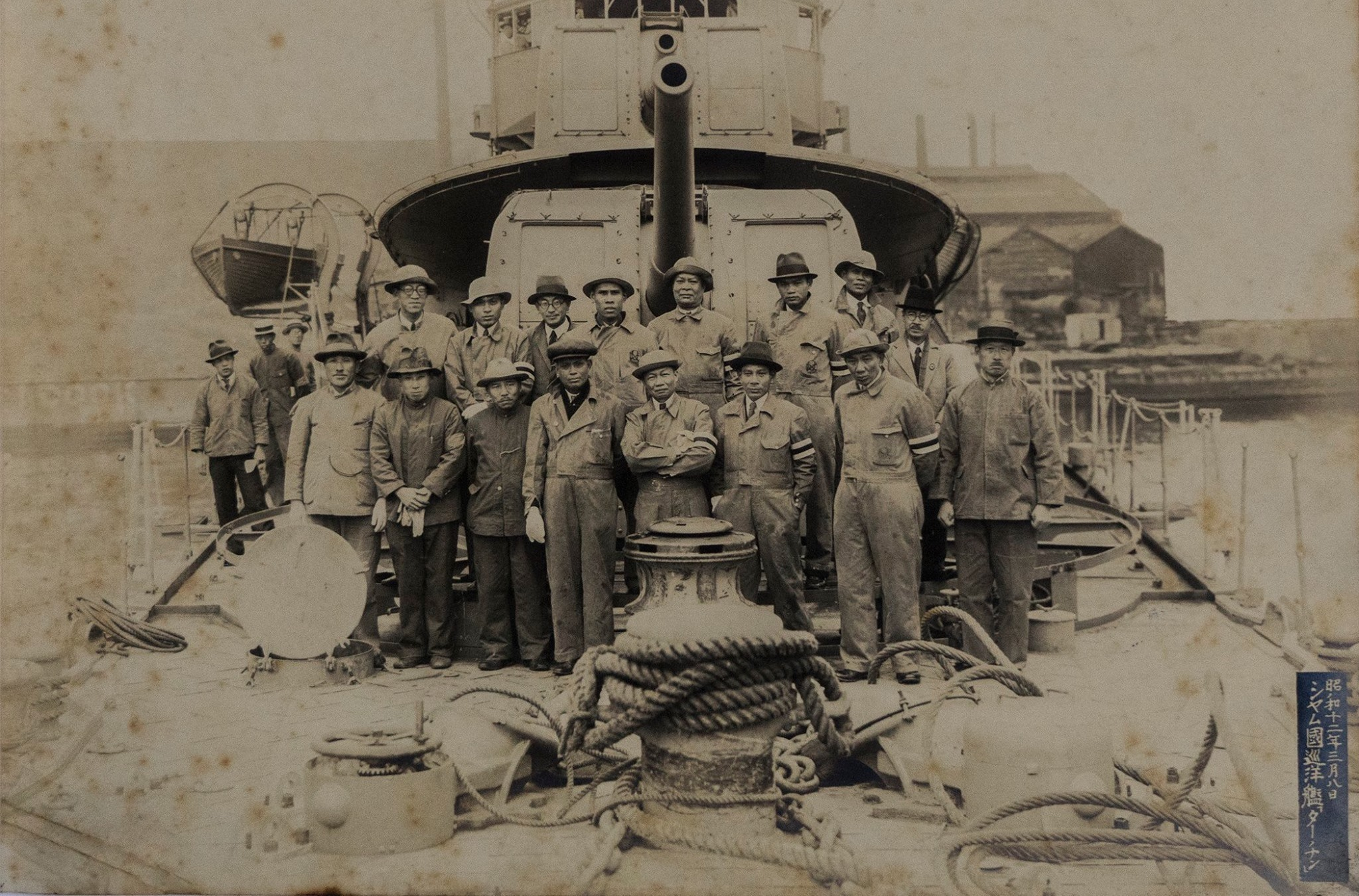
Commander Luang Chanchakrakij Chamanan at Uraga Dock Company, Yokosuka.

In 1935, the Royal Siamese Navy with guidance from military staff Captain Luang Sinthusongkhramchai has commenced a naval maintenance project through Naval Reinforcement Act of 1935 (พระราชบัญญัติบำรุงกำลังทางเรือ พ.ศ.๒๔๗๘) to provide new warships for the aging post-Revolution navy. The program is politically supported by Siamese Navy Commander-in-chief Captain Phraya Wijarnchakrakij (นาวาเอก พระยาวิจารณ์จักรกิจ บุญรอด สวาทะสุข) and Minister of Defense Colonel Luang Phibunsongkhram. The Naval Reinforcement Act of 1935 has been passed through prime minister Colonel Phraya Phahonphonphayuhasena and reviewed by the House of Representative on the 62nd meeting of 1934 then declared as an act on 1 April 1935.

One of the reasons behind Maeklong-Tachin class is how HTMS Chaophraya, an aging Hunt-Class Minesweeper transferred from British Royal Navy in 1923 currently in service as a training ship at the time is deemed to fit for training duties only and too inadequate for Showing the flag without any properly mounted armaments.

HTMS Tachin was ordered together with HTMS Maeklong and three other small torpedo boats (Klong Yai, Takbai, Kantang) in an agreement between the Royal Siamese Navy and the Japanese Mitsui Bussan Kaisha shipbuilding conglomerate on 13 August 1935. Tachin and Maeklong will be built by Uraga Dock Company at Yokosuka while three torpedo boats will be built by Ishikawajima. Captain Phra Prakobkollakij (นาวาเอก พระประกอบกลกิจ) was assigned as an overseer over shipbuilding project. HTMS Tachin was launched on 24 July 1935 on the same day Maeklong was laid down then commissioned on 26 September 1937 during the reign of young King Ananda Mahidol (Rama VIII) under the care of Regency Council led by Prince Aditya Dibabha.

== Service history ==
During the Franco-Thai War, Tachin was assigned to the 2nd Fleet as a leader of the 4th Squadron. Both her and her sister, HTMS Maeklong (Leader of the 2nd Squadron), did not saw any naval action during the brief war with French Indochina both ships took patrols along the Sattahip-Ream-Prachuap Khiri Khan route. In December 1941 during the Japanese Invasion of Thailand Tachin and Maeklong is ordered by telegram to maintain their positions at Ko Phai, Chonburi.

She was rearmed with two single Japanese 40mm Type-BI anti-aircraft gun mounts in place of her side torpedo tubes and one twin 40mm Type-BI gun mount replacing the midship seaplane storage area.

On 1 June 1945, while at Sattahip Bay, Tachin was badly damaged by RAF B-24 Liberator bombers from No.99 Squadron and No. 159 Squadron (RAAF members of the mission includes PO R. R. Temple-Smith, PO Trevor De Nett, PO A. W. Hanmer and PO M. C. Mazengarb) flying from Digri Airbase in Bengal, British Raj. The raid consisted of 10-15 (or 23) bombers attacking moored ships between islands around Sattahip Bay. One 1000 lbs bomb hit Tachin on her starboard side, crippling the main engine room and penetrates the floor into the water below then exploded under the water. 3 sailors are wounded while another 50 suffered minor injuries. Tachin was flooded through cracks in her seam, with the engine room disabled. Another civilian ship in the area, S.S.Suddhadip (เรือสุทธาทิพย์) with fuel drums as her cargo survives the initial level-bombing from the British Liberators but finally sunk from another skip-bombing attack run. In the same day, the ex-Royal Yacht HTMS Angthong (Renamed from Maha Chakri) was also attacked and sunk at Sattahip. The Royal Thai Navy tried to repair Tachin, but the damage proved to be greater than originally anticipated. Finally, Tachin was decommissioned in 1945 and broken up.
