= Maeklong =

Maeklong or Meklong may refer to:

- Mae Klong, a river in Thailand
- Samut Songkhram, a city in Thailand
  - Maeklong Railway, a railway connecting the city to Bangkok
- HTMS Maeklong, a Royal Thai Navy ship
- Meklong, a ship formerly owned by Pacific Shipowners Ltd.
