= U Taphao =

U Taphao or U Tapao (Thai: อู่ตะเภา) may refer to:

- U-Tapao International Airport in Rayong Province, Thailand
- U-Tapao Royal Thai Navy Airfield, which occupies the same facilities as the above
- U Taphao railway station, a railway station on the State Railway of Thailand's Eastern Line
- U-Tapao Station, a planned station in the Don Mueang–Suvarnabhumi–U-Tapao high-speed railway, serving the airport
- U Taphao Subdistrict in Manorom District, Chai Nat Province
- Khlong U Taphao, a river in Songkhla Province
- U-taphao Junction, a railway station in Songkhla Province, superseded by Hat Yai Junction railway station

== See also ==
- Utapau (Star Wars)
