= U Taphao railway station =

Railway station in Chonburi, Thailand

U Taphao อู่ตะเภา
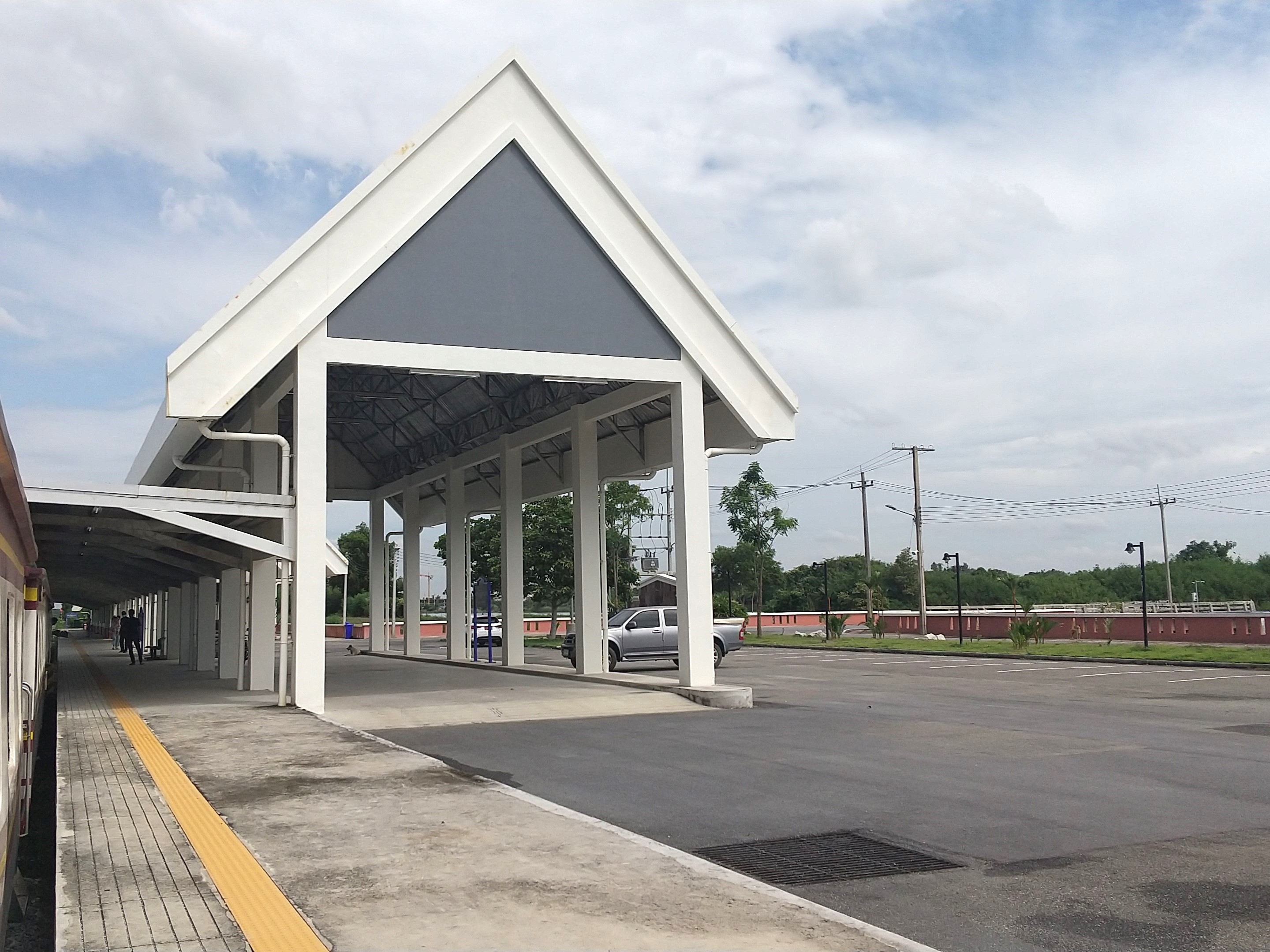

General information
- Location: Phlu Ta Luang Subdistrict, Sattahip District; Chon Buri Province; Thailand
- Coordinates: 12.6616°N 100.9652°E
- Operator: State Railway of Thailand
- Manager: Ministry of Transport
- Line: Chuk Samet Main Line
- Platforms: 1
- Tracks: 2

Construction
- Structure type: At-grade

Other information
- Station code: อต.
- Classification: Class 1

History
- Opened: 10 November 2023

Services
Preceding station	State Railway of Thailand	Following station
Ban Phlu Ta Luang towards Hua Lamphong	Eastern Line	Chuk Samet Terminus
Location

U Taphao railway station is a railway station located in Phlu Ta Luang Subdistrict, Sattahip District, Chon Buri, Thailand. It is a class 1 railway station located 189.00 km from Bangkok (Hua Lamphong) railway station. U-Tapao International Airport is located nearby the station.

== Background ==
The station opened on 10 November 2023 as part of the reopening of the Eastern Line Ban Phlu Ta Luang–Sattahip Port (Chuk Samet) section.
