= Ban Phlu Ta Luang railway station =

Railway station in Chonburi, Thailand

Ban Phlu Ta Luang บ้านพลูตาหลวง
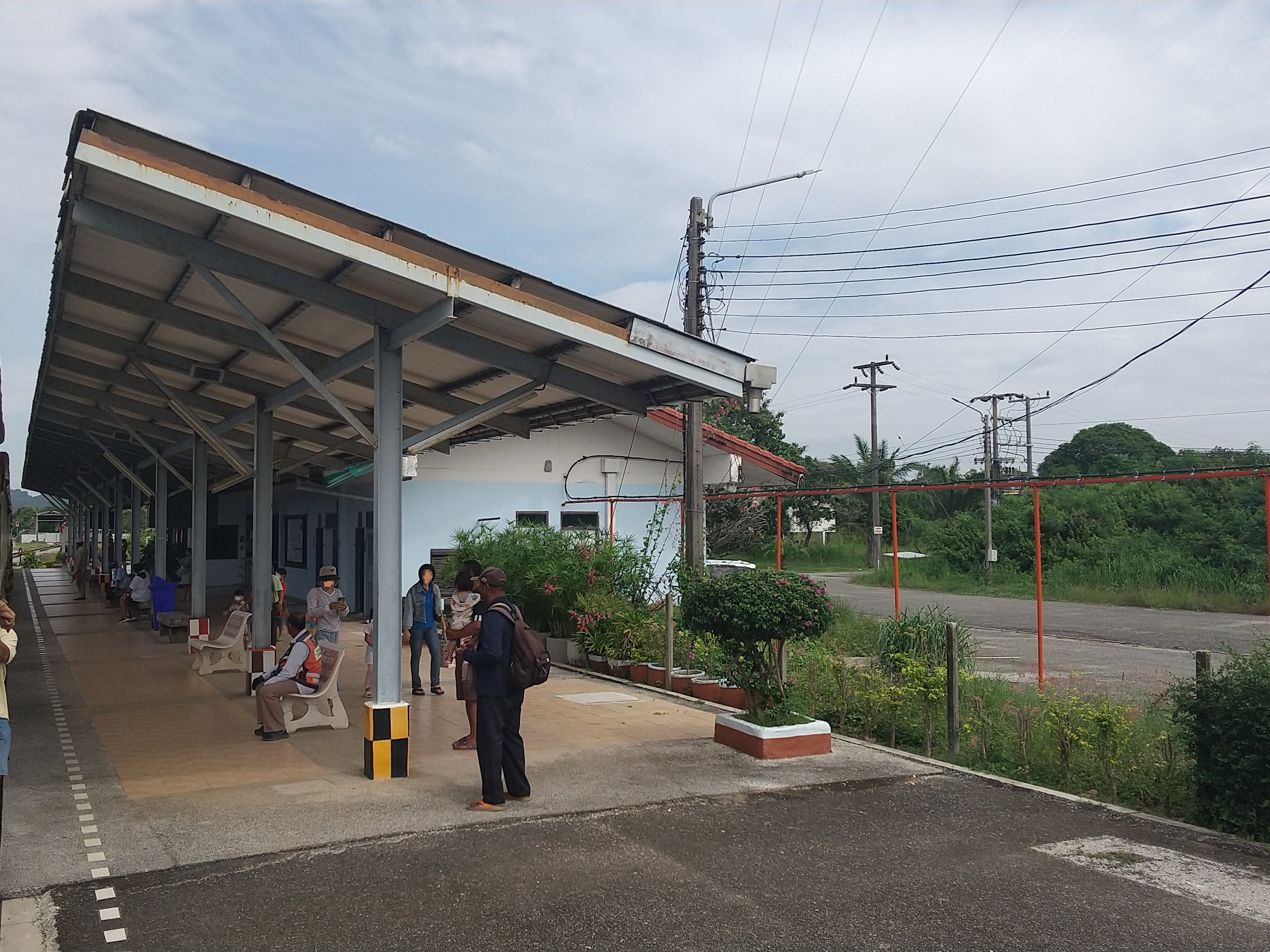

General information
- Location: Phlu Ta Luang Subdistrict, Sattahip District; Chon Buri Province; Thailand
- Coordinates: 12.704554°N 100.972466°E
- Operator: State Railway of Thailand
- Manager: Ministry of Transport
- Line: Chuk Samet Main Line
- Platforms: 1
- Tracks: 7

Construction
- Structure type: At-grade

Other information
- Station code: พต.
- Classification: Class 3

History
- Opened: 14 July 1989

Services
Preceding station	State Railway of Thailand	Following station
Khao Chi Chan Junction towards Hua Lamphong	Eastern Line	U Taphao towards Chuk Samet
Location

Ban Phlu Ta Luang railway station is a railway station located in Phlu Ta Luang Subdistrict, Sattahip District, Chon Buri, Thailand. It is a class 3 railway station located 184.033 kilometres (114.353 mi) from Bangkok railway station.

The station opened in July 1989 as part of the Eastern Line Chachoengsao Junction–Sattahip Port section. Until the early 2000s, freight trains continued further down the line to Sattahip's Chuk Samet Port. Between then and 10 November 2023, Ban Phlu Ta Luang was the terminus of the passenger service from Bangkok, when Chuk Samet railway station reopened.
