= Chulachomklao Fort =

Former fortification in Samut Prakan, Thailand

- ป้อมพระจุลจอมเกล้า (Thai)
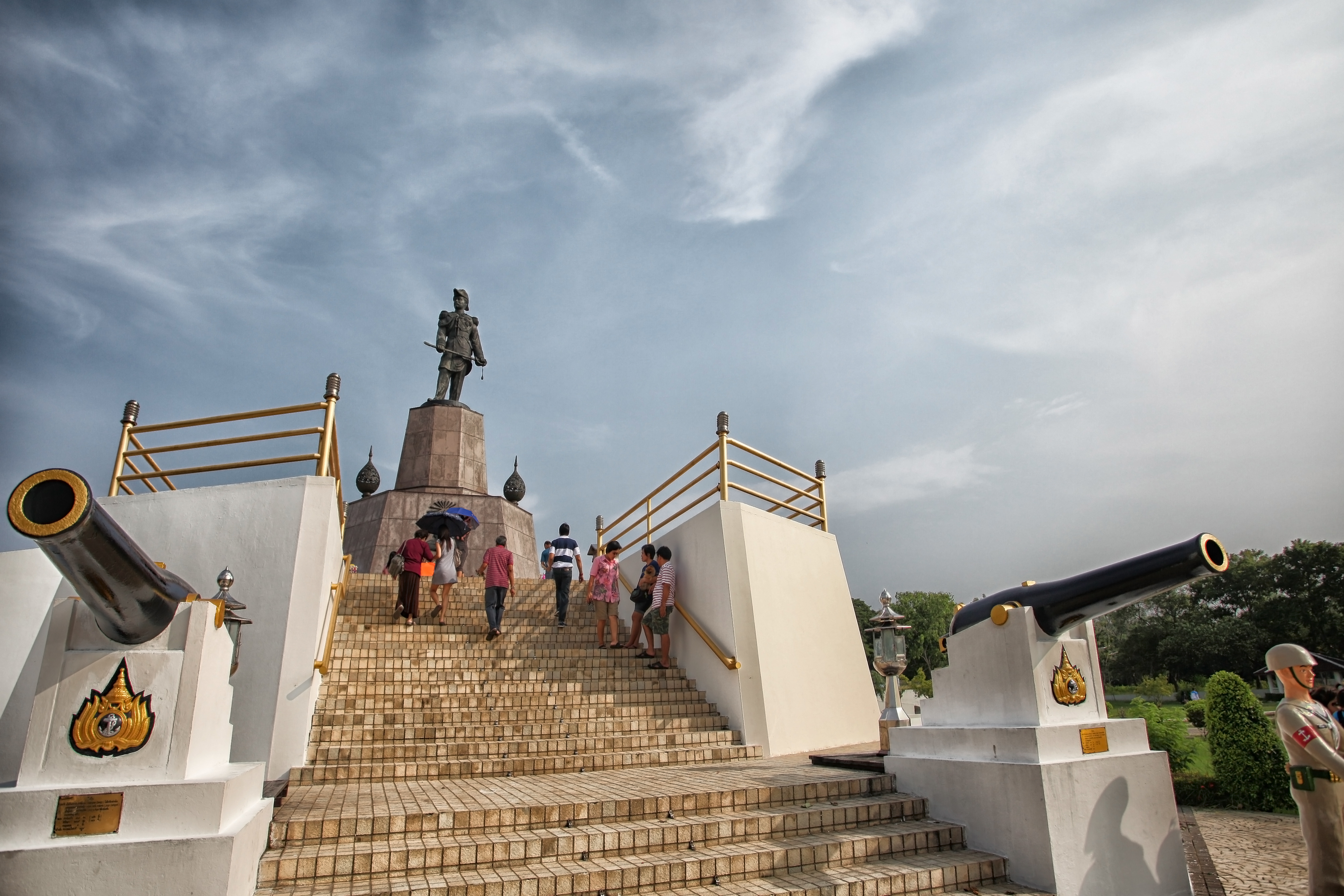
- Monument of King Chulalongkorn

- Location of the fort relative to Bangkok
- 13.5378°N 100.5837°E
- Location: Phra Samut Chedi, Samut Prakan, Thailand

History
- Built: c. March 1884

Site notes
- Architectural style: Western style artillery turret

Phra Chulachomklao Fort (ป้อมพระจุลจอมเกล้า; also known as "Phra Chun Fort") is a water fortress in a sub-district of Laem Fa Pha, Phra Samut Chedi District, Samut Prakan Province. With no evidence of the date, approximately in March 1884, King Chulalongkorn (King Rama V) built this fort to protect the enemy from England and France. The King Rama V built this fort as a western artillery turret, which contained 7 153/32 mm Armstrong cannons, nicknamed a 'crouching tiger cannon,' which were the major weapons of this fort, making the fort the most modern in those days.

King Rama V, besides the idea of building this fortification, also came to test-fire a crouching tiger cannon by himself on May 28, 1893, this fort was used to fire against French warships in the Paknam Incident.

At present, Phra Chulachomklao Fort is under the supervision of the Bangkok Naval Base and built a statue of King Rama V in 1993 to commemorate the virtues of King Rama V, and the Royal Thai Navy has also organized a museum open to the public. For this reason, they considered this fort as another important tourist attraction in Samut Prakan Province.

In 1993, a statue of King Rama V was built to commemorate his virtues, then, in 1996, Royal Thai Navy decided to discharge the Phra Chulachomklao Fort. At present, the fort is an open-air museum that is under the management of the Bangkok Naval Base. For this reason, Phra Chulachomklao Fort is considered an important tourist attraction in Samut Prakan Province.

== History ==
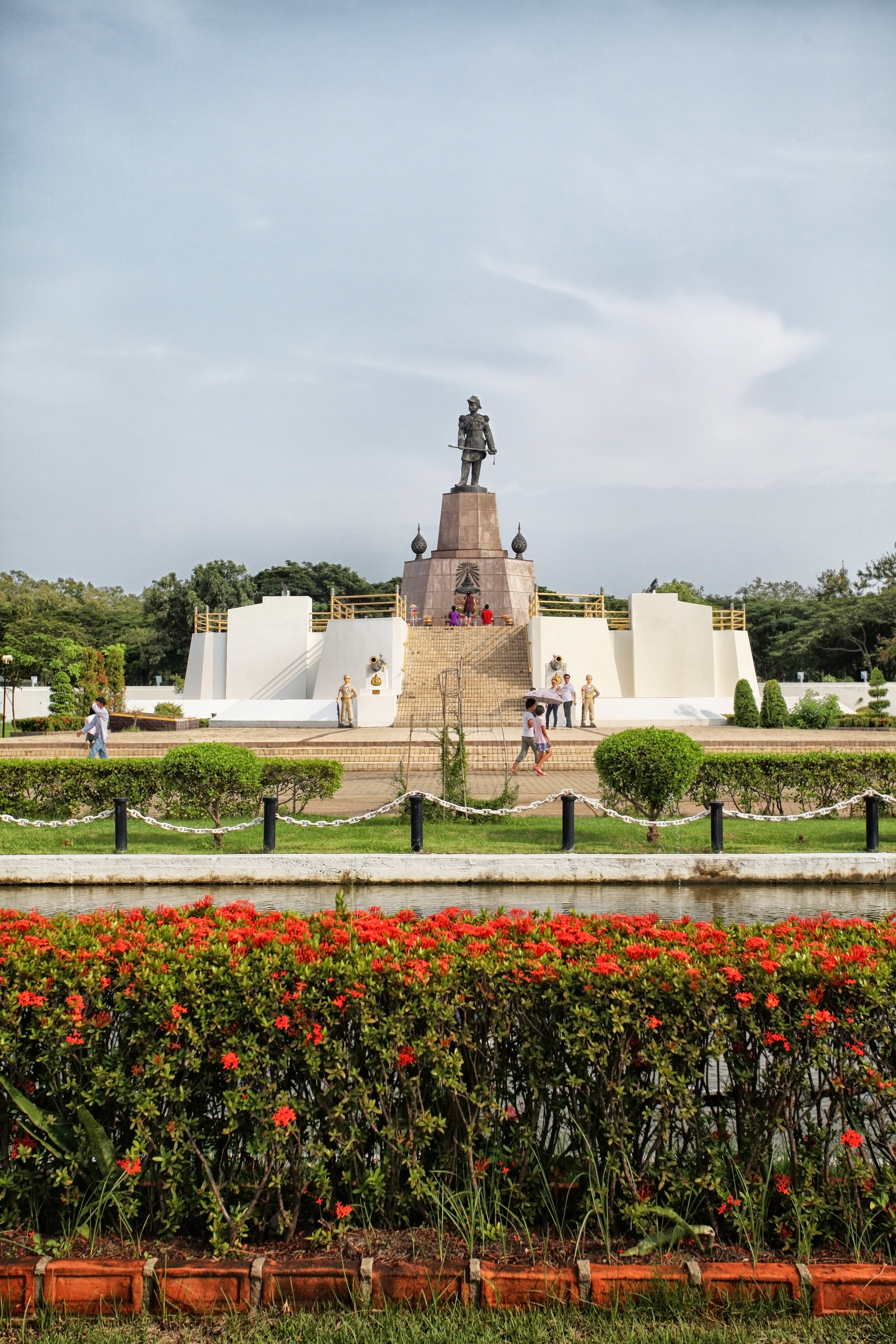
Chulachomklao Fort

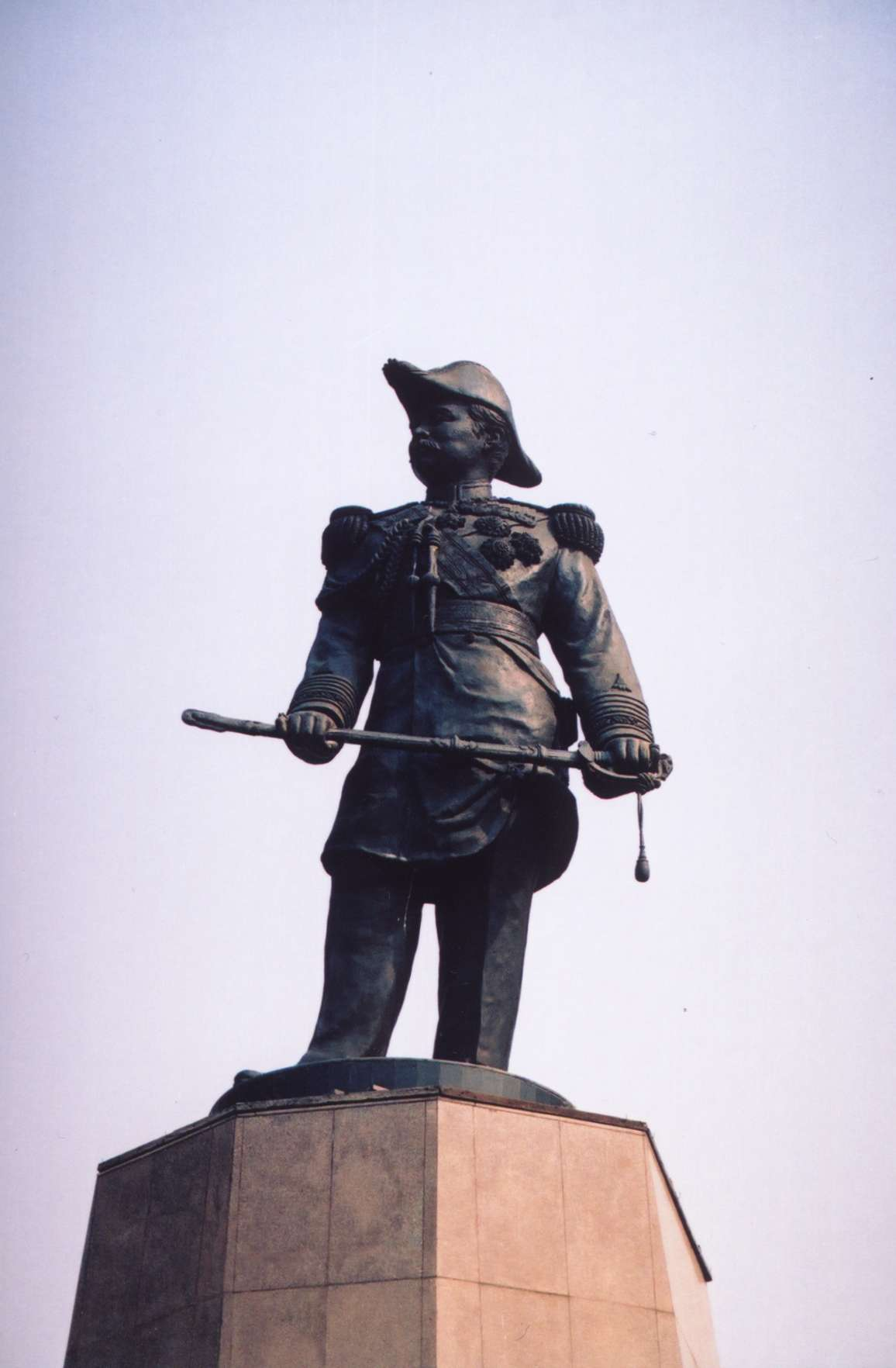
The royal monument of King Chulalongkorn at Phra Chulachomklao Fort

Samut Prakan Province plays a role in the country's security, because of Witthayakom Fort, Chao Saming Phrai Fort, Electric Prank Fortress, and Enemy Fort Perish. However, these forts are more well known to the others as 'Phra Chulachomklao Fort'. The King Rama V built the fort according to the public wishes to defend His Majesty King Chulalongkorn by his funds and property.

King Rama V saw that the existed fortress was damaged and obsolete. Moreover, it was also not suitable for further national defense because lacking advanced technology to fight with a western nation. So, in 1878, King Rama V ordered Luang Cholayut Yothin (Danish) to design the fort in a modern western style and built it in 1884 by using the Royal treasury money. However, the money was not enough due to there was being accelerated development in many areas. A large investment was required to complete the fort construction on schedule, then the king decided to give his money in the amount of 10,000 weighs (800,000 baht), as stated in one of the royal letters that as stated in one of the royal letters that "Will give the name of Chulalongkorn Fort King Chulalongkorn similar to all the fortresses in which they used some titles of the lords of the earth". When the fort was completed in the middle of 1893, King Rama V ordered an Armstrong cannon, barrel size 6 inches, 7 barrels from Sir W. G Armstrong Company Limited to install them in the gun hole. They classified these cannons as the first stern cannon that the Thai Navy owns. Each bullet weighs almost 50 kilograms. Moreover, the fort's artillery installation supervisor and the captain was Vice-Admiral Phraya Wichitnawi and Von Holt artillery teacher got appointed as the first fort commander. Such a gun time to shoot must use the force of compressed oil to lift the gun to surface the hole.

The Phra Chun Fort played a significant role in serving the country during the 1893 Franco-Siamese crisis. On the evening of 13 July 1893 the Ye Be Say (JB Say), which was a pilot-boat for two French warships, was commanded by Captain Bory for sailing intruded into the Gulf of Thailand. Soldiers at the Phra Chun Fort decided to shoot the French boats till the pilot boat ran aground at Laem Phu Rai beach. After that, the French Ships hoisted their battle flags and bombarded the fort. Next, Thai soldiers tried to blast back with every canon. From this situation, many experts agreed that Thailand was inferior to the French because the Thai military force lacked the training of using the weapons. Another reason was that there was only one Thai soldier who was on duty at the fort which the other two were Danish who recently came to work in Thailand.

== Architecture ==
Phra Chulachomklao Fort is a western artillery turret. The structure is hexagonal. which is a building extending to the north of the fort near the mouth of the Chao Phraya River for strategy. The structure comprises 7 artillery holes, as well as personnel transport channels, armor room, and freshwater tank. The crosshair which uses to observe the enemy locates above the gun's hole.

== Important tourist attractions ==
Tourist attractions and exhibitions within the Phra Chulachomklao Fort, which comprises 7 parts:

=== The royal monument of King Chulalongkorn ===
The royal monument of King Chulalongkorn was built to honor and commemorate His Majesty King Chulalongkorn. On January 19, 1993, the Thai Navy joined with the private sector to establish the Thai Navy. Rama IX, along with Maha Chakri Sirindhorn, unveiled King Chulalongkorn's royal monument at Phra Chulachomklao Fort. People who came with roses and cigars to worship, there will be a plaque at the base of the royal monument with the text from the King's letter, which reads, "If Siam's freedom had ended, my life would have ended by then."

=== Chulachomklao Fort Exhibition Hall ===
On October 23, 2001, Maha Chakri Sirindhorn launched Chulachomklao Fort Exhibition Hall, where is beneath King Chulalongkorn's base. The exhibition hall displays the history of King Rama V, the history of Chulachomklao Fort especially a related occurrence during the Franco-Siamese crisis, and also the Thai Navy's history.

=== Phra Nares and Phra Narai Shrines ===
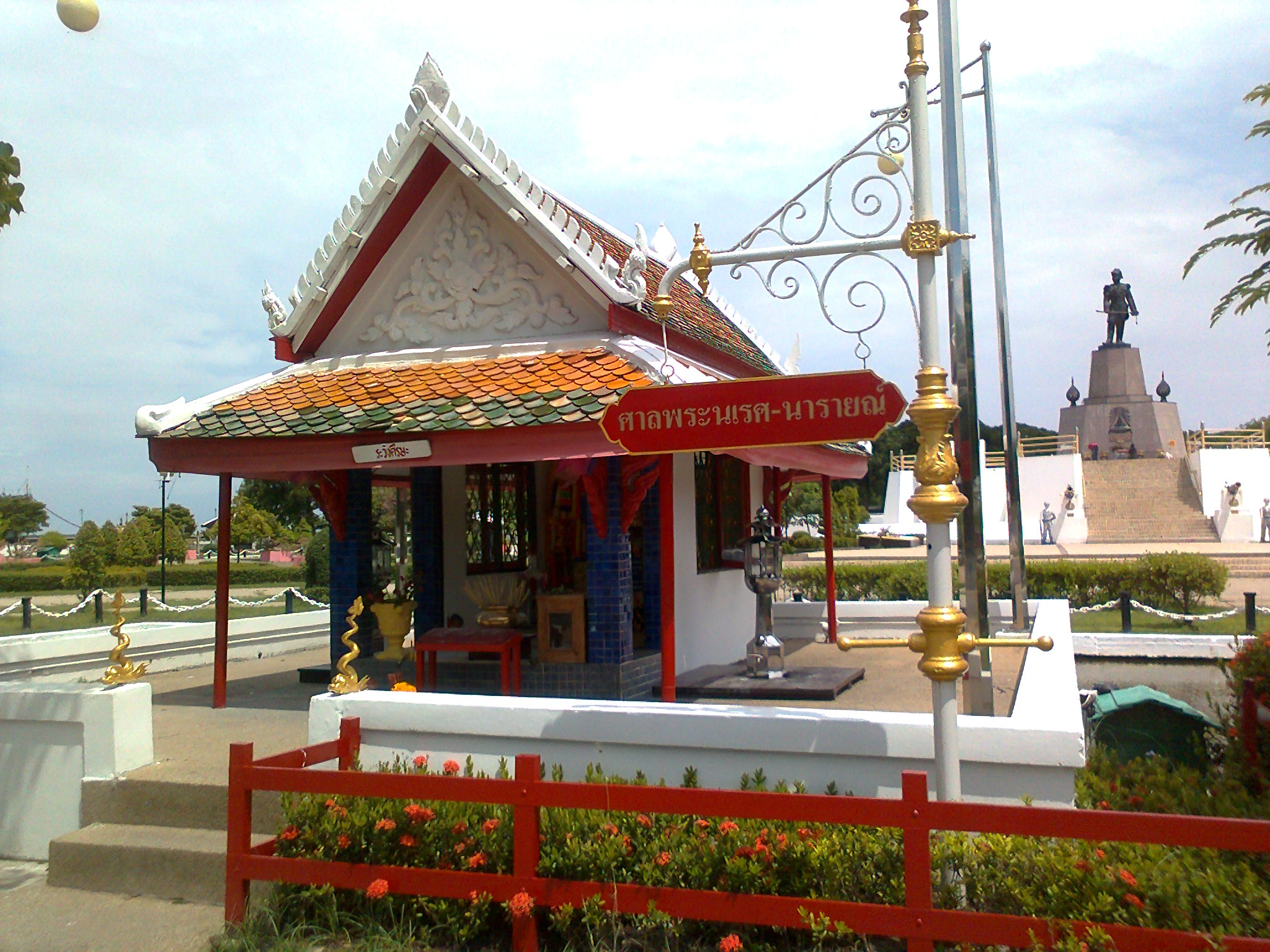
Phra Nares and Phra Narai Shrines

Phra Nares and Phra Narai Shrines are Brahmin-Hindu religious for the prosperity of those who visited. These shrines are the sacred object of Phra Chulachomklao Fort. They were constructed in the reign of King Rama V, after that, in 1884 they have torn apart as a pair with the construction of Phra Chula Chom Klao Fort.

=== Armstrong cannons ===
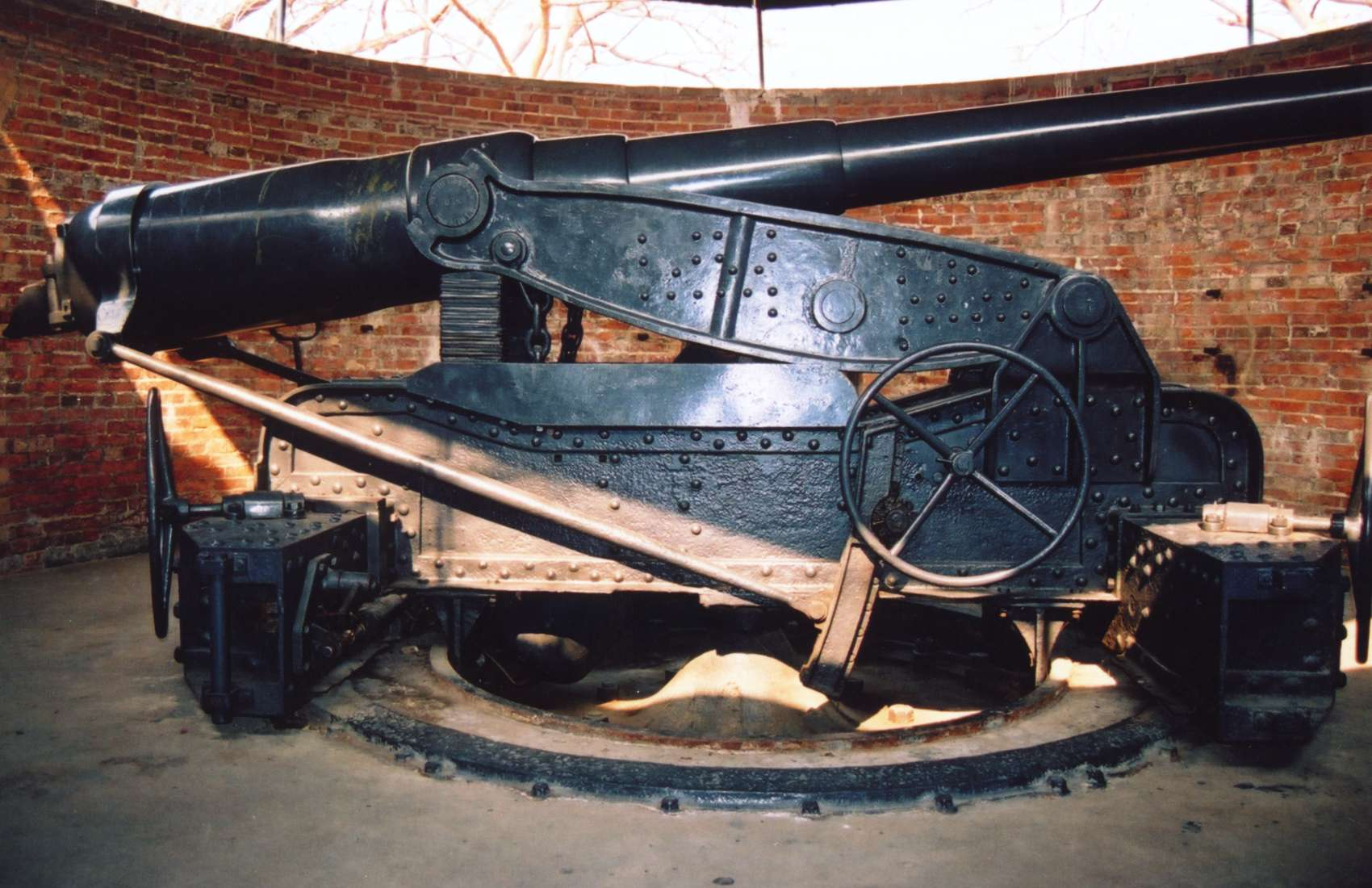
ARMSTRONG cannons

Crouching Tiger or Armstrong Cannon is a 152/32 mm cannon from Sir W. G. Armstrong (William George Armstrong), currently Vickers Armstrong Engineering Company, England. His Majesty King Chulalongkorn officially endorsed the purchase as the private property of the King. In 1893, 10 cylinders (7 cylinders installed at King Chulalongkorn Fort and 3 cylinders installed at the Ocean Butterfly Fortress) were to be stationed in Phra Chulachomklao Fort. In addition, the design is similar to a western turret in which the corridors inside are quite narrow and tiny and the ceiling is c. 2 meters high in the shape of tortoiseshell with curves down on both sides. On the way, there are many small rooms for storage the bullets with plenty to collect ammo. A distinctive feature is that this gun is mounted in a dedicated gun hole, raising the gun when firing uses hydro-pneumatic as the suspension system. Once fired, the gun will crouch, which is the origin of the commonly known as the 'crouching gun.' In the crisis of R.E. 112, these rifles were also used in combat against the French fleet. And Armstrong Cannon was also the first sniper artillery in use in the Navy.

=== HTMS Mae Klong Museum ===
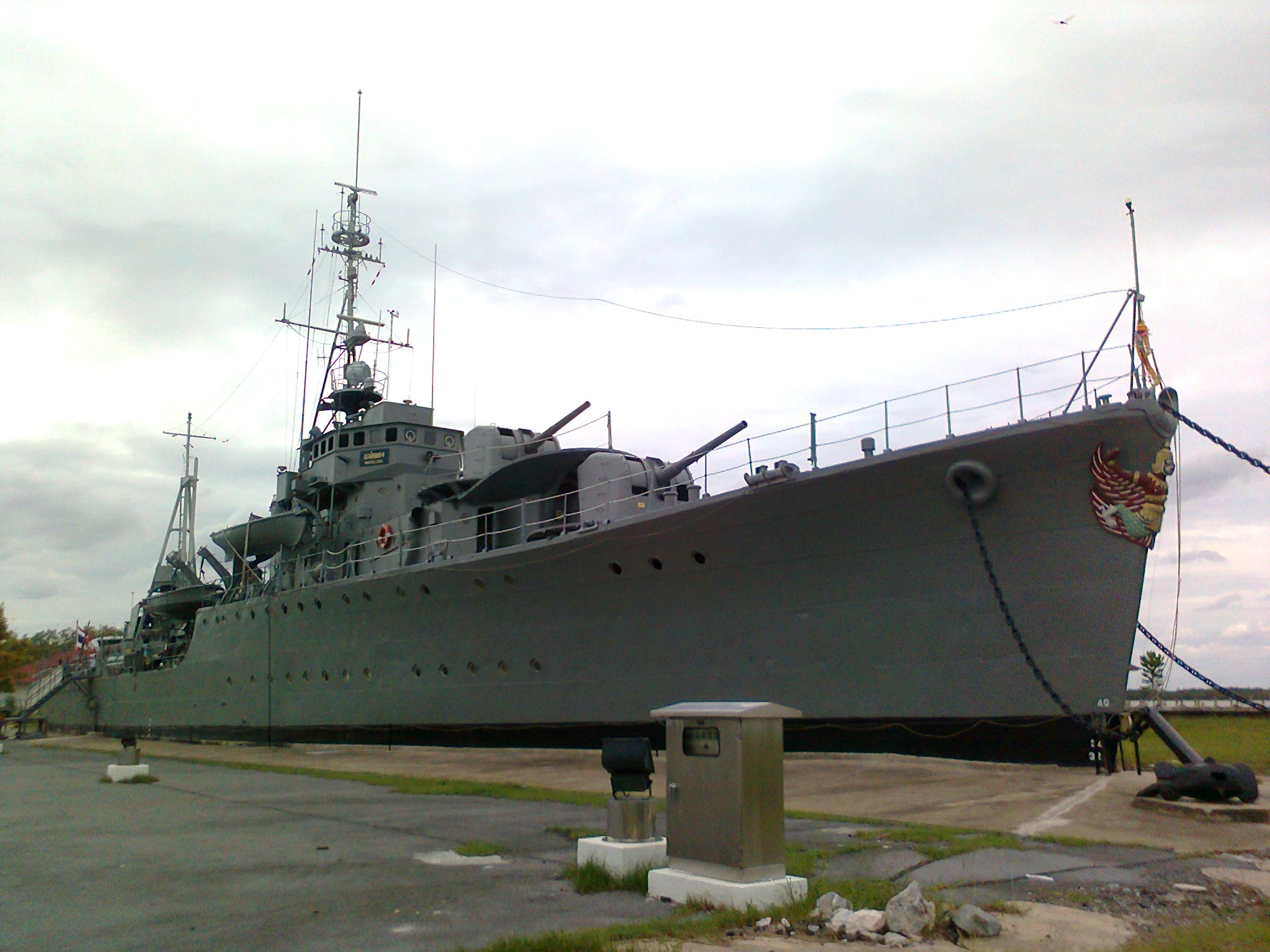
HTMS Maeklong

HTMS Mae Klong Museum is one of the 7 projects that the Royal Thai Navy organizes as a Thai Warship Museum. It is an open-air museum that was held to honor His Majesty the King Rama V in the year of the Golden Jubilee in 1996. It has many rooms such as a bridge or control room which is the most essential room on HTMS Mae Klong. For inside the museum, historical information about HTMS Maeklong and the warship Luang Mae Klong is provided. HTMS Maeklong is a frigate-type warship that was made at Uraga Shipyard Yokosuka City, Japan in 1936 by controlling of Captain Luang Chanchakkit Chamanan and Phra Praprakokkonkit. The warship was commissioned in 1937 and retired in 1996 with over 59 years of service. The age of HTMS Mae Klong is the longest-serving warship in the history of the Royal Thai Navy and it is the second oldest warship in the world that has been used in many important functions such as being used as a royal barge in the reign of King Rama 8 and Rama 9 to fight in the Great East Asia War and being used as a naval training ship.

=== Naval Historical Park ===
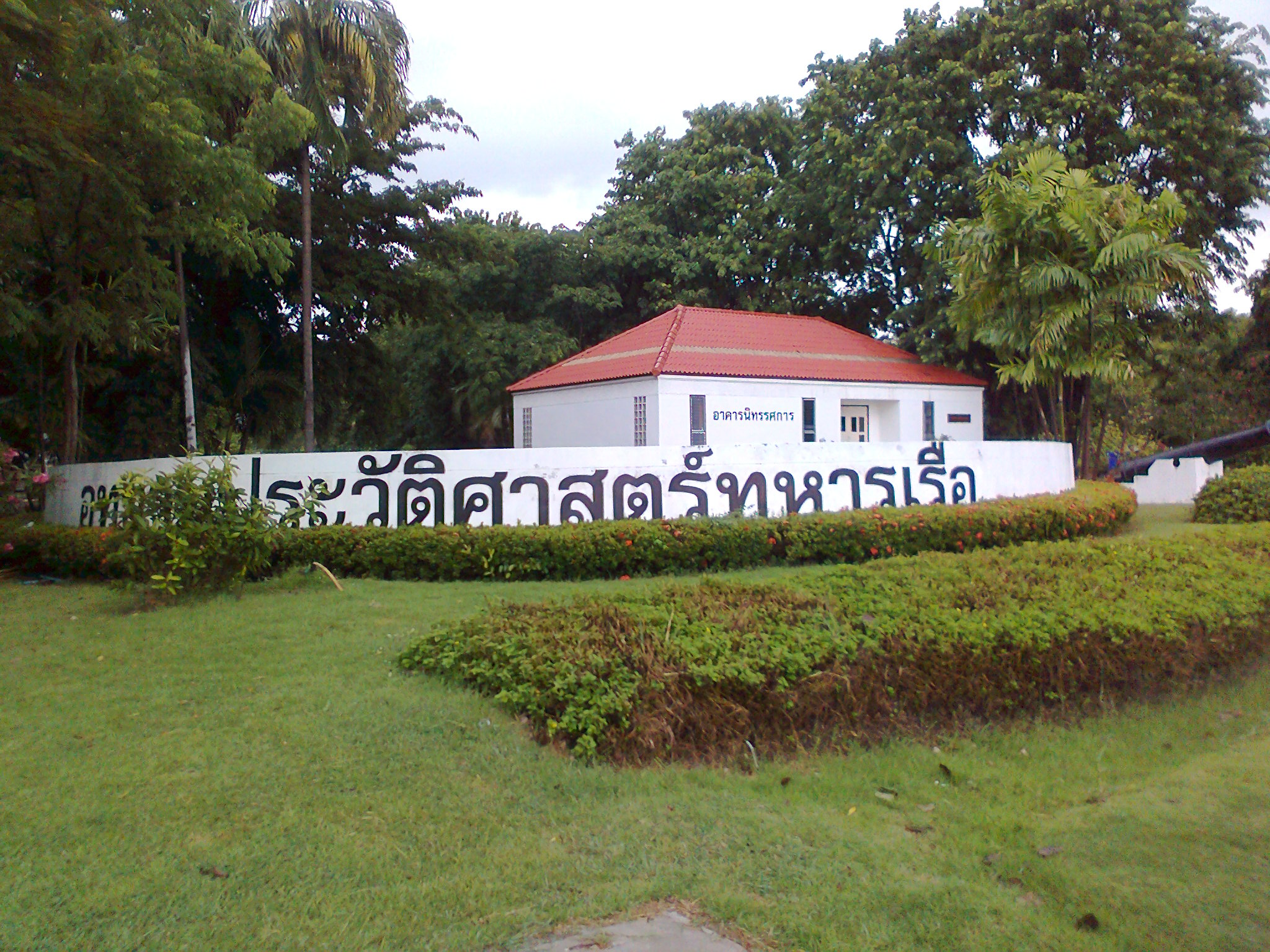
Naval Historical Park

The Royal Thai Navy built a Naval Historical park for the honor to His Majesty King Bhumibol Adulyadej, on the auspicious occasion of His Majesty the King's 6th cycle on December 5, 1999. Besides, the park provides an exhibiting arrangement and display of weapons and components. The Naval Historical Park is not only one of the important historical parks for the navy but also shows the evolution in protecting the country's sovereignty. Moreover, the collection of guns and weapons of the reigns of King Rama V and Rama VI from 25 January 1996 have been preserved, decorated, repaired, and displayed accordingly for current maritime interests. This would be a benefit for the future generation to study the evolution of naval weapons in national defense and in securing the interests of the nation.

The layout of the Naval Historical Park comprises the exhibition building, the 9 pavilions where present various important events of the Navy, and there are outdoor components that display an arrangement of weapons. For the outdoor areas, they are divided into 5 groups.

Group 1 is a group of 7 disappearing guns. Information about these guns and historical stories are provided to show the genius monks and perspectives of King Rama V.

Group 2 is a group of weapons during the reign of King Rama V and King Rama VI. This part focus on the weapons and the procurement of HTMS Phra Ruang boats of King Rama VI, as well as armaments of the two reigns. Lists of the guns and their components that this group display is shown in the following items:

- 120/40 mm guns, 37 mm guns, field wheels, 45 torpedoes

- 76/40 mm guns (Japanese), 45 g torpedoes, 45 g torpedoes

- 57/40 mm guns (boat platform), helmet-style mines, 120/40 mm guns (HTMS Phra Ruang)

- 37/20 mm guns (ship platform), 37 mm machine guns, 5 caliber catering guns, 53 g torpedoes

- 47/40 mm guns, field wheels (meaning guns), 11 mm machine guns, 10 caliber catering guns

- 40/40 mm machine gun, single platform, 57/40 mm gun, 57 mm wheel field (installed on torpedo boats)

- 8 mm machine gun, Hotdis, 37/20 mm gun, 45 b torpedo wheel

Group 3 is a group of guns and weapons which used for World War I, the naval battle at Koh Chang, and World War II. There is the display of various weapons and historical stories of them. Lists of the guns and their components that this group display is shown in the following items:

- Type 77 torpedoes, 20 mm machine gun, Madsen type 77, 40/40 mm guns, dual-platform

- 76/45 mm guns, 20 mm Madsen machine guns, 80-type guns, 75/51 mm guns, 75/51 mm guns.

Group 4 is a group of guns and weapons that the Navy has used since World War II until the present, including the layout of armaments placement that used in the fight against terrorists and communists is also provided with information. Lists of the guns and their components that this group display is shown in the following items:

- 75/41 mm guns, 102/45 mm guns of the HTMS Pho Sam Ton, 20 mm Ericson machine guns

- 37 mm bazooka, field wheels, 4.2-inch grenade launcher, water patrol boat (PBR)

- 90 mm gun, field wheels, 75 mm reflex gun, amphibious vehicle (LVT)

Group 5 is the placement of structures and components to show the role of the Navy during peacetime. In the same way, this group provides information about the navy maintaining national interests at sea, such as marine gas drilling bases, simulated fishing boats..

=== Mangrove Nature Trail ===
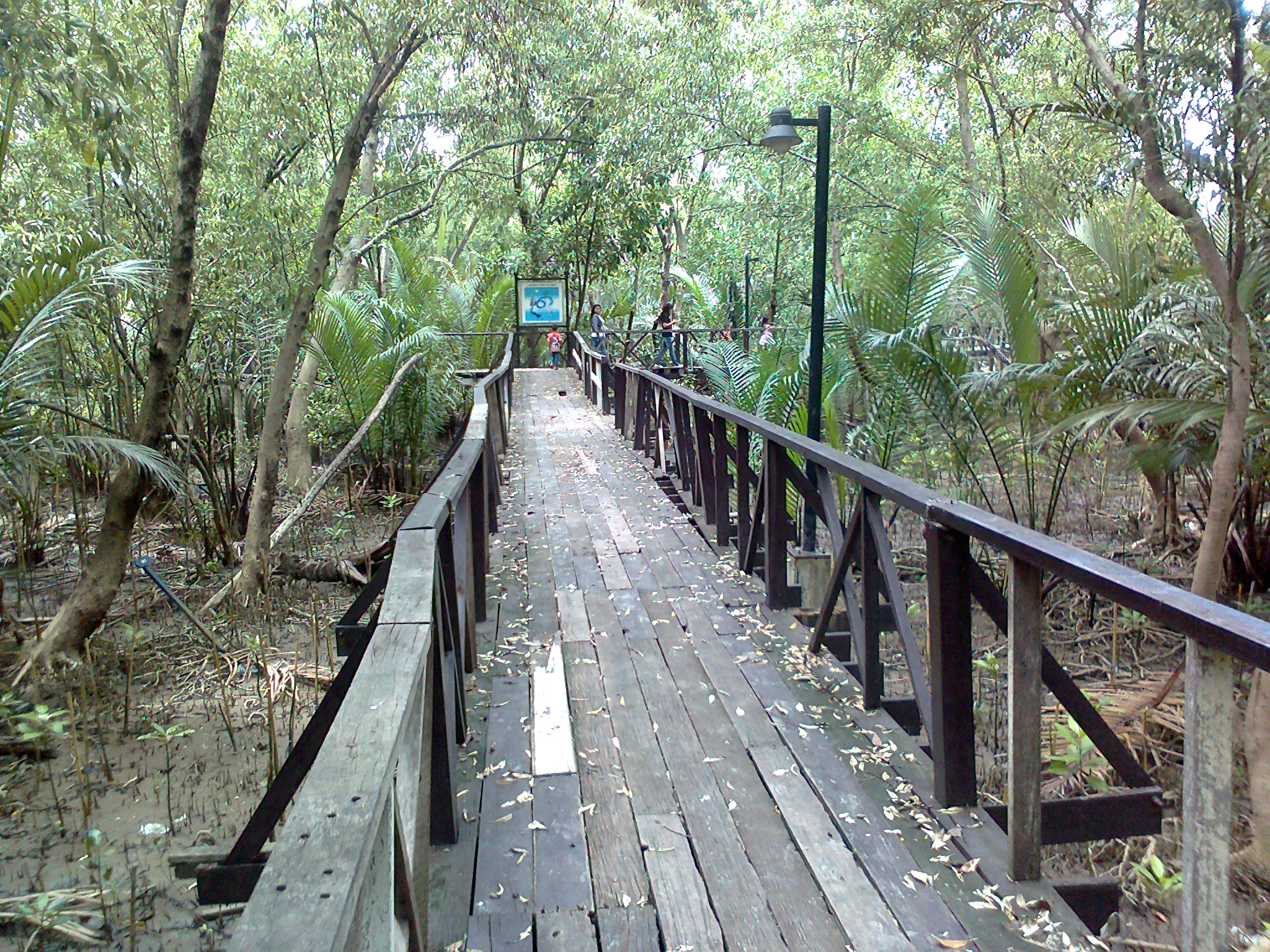
Mangrove Nature Trail

The mangrove nature trail is suitable for walking and enjoying the view of mangrove plants. Mangrove Nature Trail is a SHERA Bridge with a distance of 750 meters. Since1999 the bridge has been considered as a source of academic knowledge from the actual place, showing the names and stories of each plant and animal living in the mangrove forest. In Phra Chulachomklao Fort's region, there are small mangroves, large mangroves, Pho Thale, Lamphu, Lampen, gills of cichlids from claws, shrimps, and trout. And some signs provide scientific knowledge and benefits of each herb along the bridge path.

== Location ==
The Phra Chulachomklao Fort locates in Thailand's, Samut Prakan Province, Laem Fa Pha Subdistrict, Phra Samut Chedi District. Visitors can travel by private car which there is parking at the Phra Chula Fortress. Traveling by bus can take bus no. 20 from BTS Wongwian Yai and get off opposite Pom Nakharatsawatyanon School, then cross the road to the school side and take a blue minibus to Phra Chulachomklao Fort's entrance.
