= Ko Khram =

Ko Khram เกาะคราม
- Island
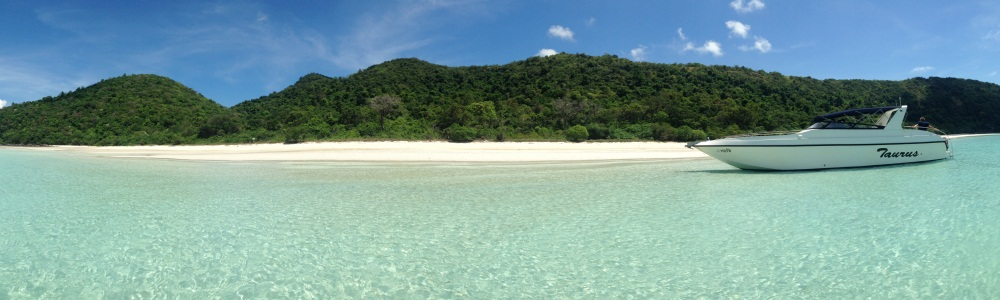
- A beach on Ko Khram

- Location within Thailand
- Coordinates: 12°42′N 100°47′E
- Country: Thailand
- Province: Chonburi Province
- District: Sattahip
- Elevation: 219 m (719 ft)
- Time zone: UTC+7 (ICT)

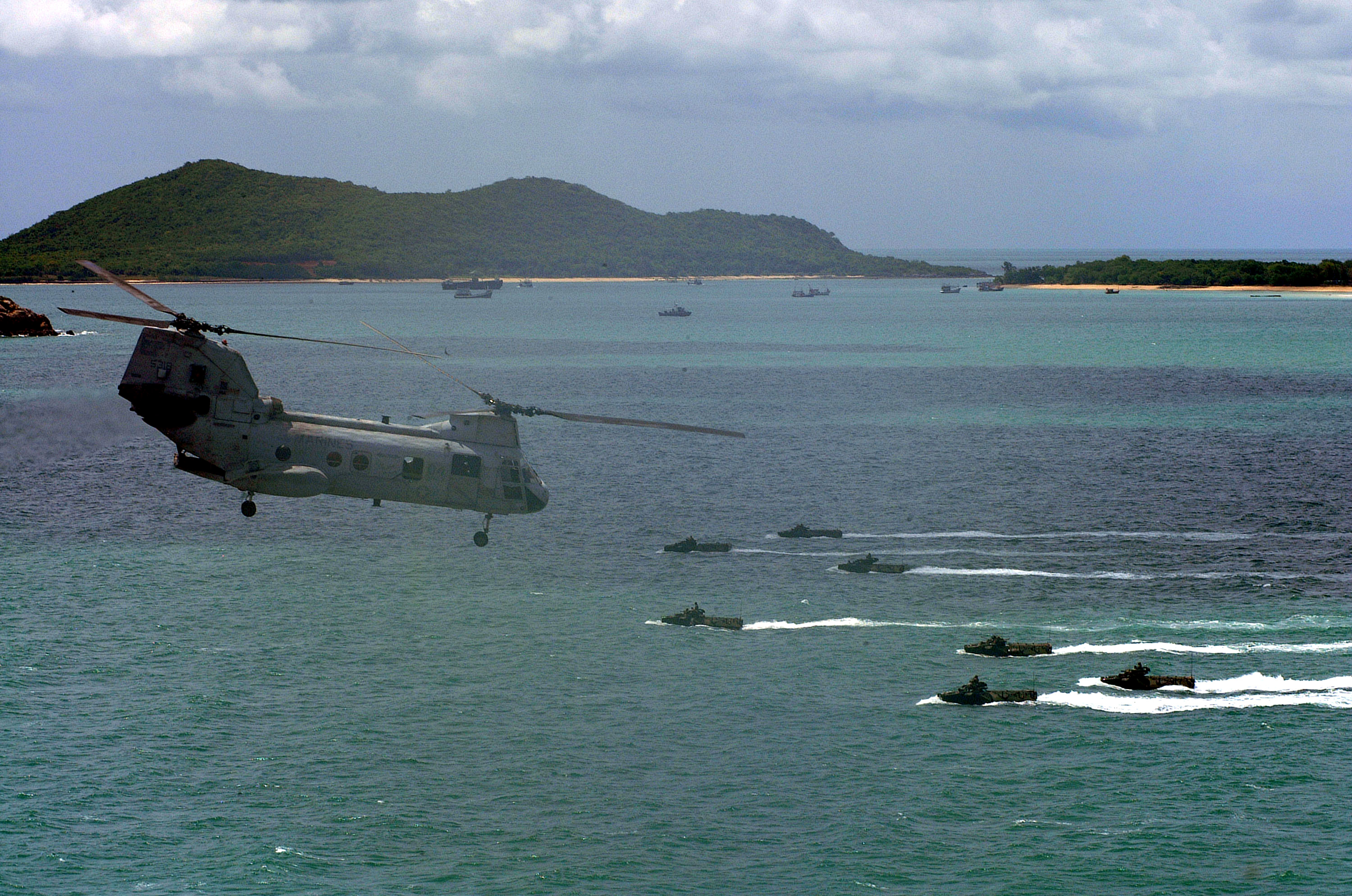
Ko Khram's shore and adjacent islets during a combined amphibious landing force exercise (CALFEX).

Ko Khram (Thai: เกาะคราม, pronounced [kɔ̀ʔ kʰrāːm]), also known as Ko Khram Yai (เกาะครามใหญ่, [kɔ̀ʔ kʰrāːm jàj]), is an island in Bangkok Bay about 24 km south southwest of Pattaya. It is the largest of the eastern seaboard islands of Thailand and the largest island in the bay.

== Geography ==
Ko Khram is thickly wooded and uninhabited. It has a length of 5.7 km and its maximum width is about 4 km. The island's coast is formed by rocky cliffs with white sandy beaches in between.

This island marks the southeasternmost point of the Bay of Bangkok, on the east side of the Gulf of Siam. Administratively Ko Khram belongs to Sattahip District, Chonburi Province.

Ko Khram is separated from the shore by a 3.4 km wide sound. Both this island and the smaller islands and islets surrounding it, as well as the adjacent coast, are a military area belonging to the Royal Thai Navy base at Sattahip and are off limits for tourists. The island's beaches are designated sea turtle conservation areas.

== Adjacent islands ==
Other islands of the Ko Khram group include the following, among some minor rocks and islets:

Name	Thai Name	Location	Coordinates
Ko Khram Noi	เกาะครามน้อย	0.75 km north of Ko Khram's NE point	12.727°N 100.798°E
Ko I Ra	เกาะอีร้า	2.5 km southeast of Ko Khram's SE shore	12.676°N 100.823°E
Ko Klet Kaeo	เกาะเกล็ดแก้ว	6.5 km northeast of Ko Khram's NE point, close to the mainland shore	12.761°N 100.845°E

- Not part of the group, Ko Rin (เกาะริน) is an island further offshore, 11 km to the NW of Ko Khram's northernmost point.

== See also ==
- List of islands of Thailand
