= Phlu Ta Luang =

Coordinates: 12.73901993°N 100.97331633°E

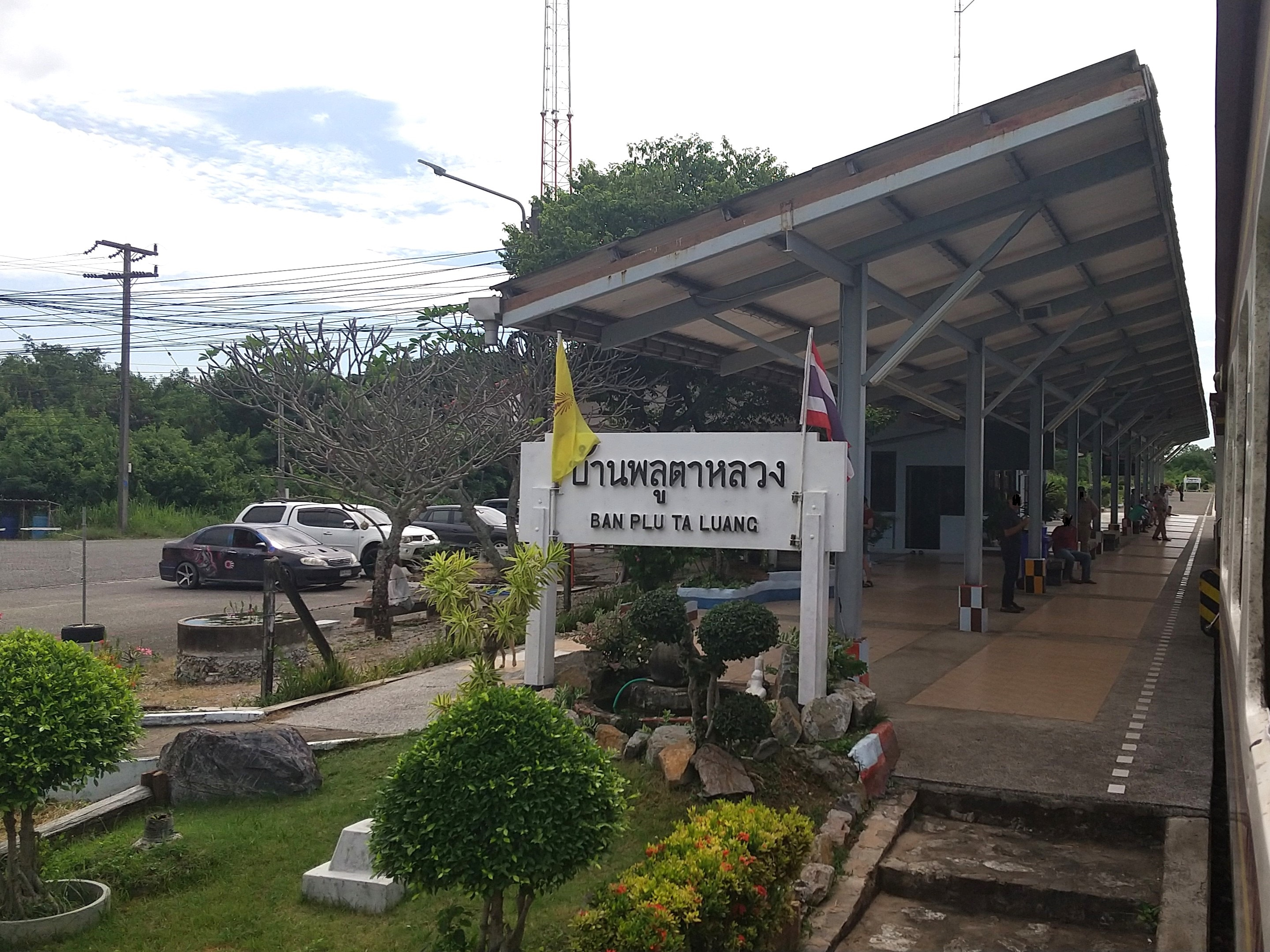
Ban Phlu Ta Luang railway station on December 4, 2023

Phlu Ta Luang (Thai: พลูตาหลวง, pronounced [pʰlūː tāː lǔa̯ŋ]) is a tambon (subdistrict) in Sattahip district of Chonburi province, eastern Thailand.

== History ==
About 100 years ago, Phlu Ta Luang area was still the forestlands with Khao Ta Luang, Khao Tabak and many other hills. In the Ta Luang Valley, clear streams flowed from Khlong Ta Luang to Khlong Phai canals, where it empties into the sea (Gulf of Thailand) at Ban U-tapao village.

The roaming of the folks in those days, the main means of transport were wagons and boats.

Phlu Ta Luang was also considered a seaport with merchant ships passing by. It was one of the most prosperous seaside settlements on the eastern border.

At 1:00 AM on August 5, 2022, a fire broke out in Mountain B nightclub a total of 14 people died, making it the first great fire in the locality.

== Administration ==
Most of Phlu Ta Luang is administered by Subdistrict Administrative Organization Phlu Ta Luang (SAO Phlu Ta Luang). Some parts are dependent on Sattahip Municipality.

It was further divided into 8 mubans (villages)

No.	Name	Thai
1.	Ban Phlu Ta Luang	บ้านพลูตาหลวง
2.	Ban Khlot	บ้านขลอด
3.	Ban Khlong Phai	บ้านคลองไผ่
4.	Ban Khlong Phlu Ta Luang	บ้านคลองพลูตาหลวง
5.	Ban Khao Baisi	บ้านเขาบายศรี
6.	Ban Khao Tabaek	บ้านเขาตะแบก
7.	Ban Nong Ya Noi	บ้านหนองหญ้าน้อย
8.	Ban Nong Ya	บ้านหนองหญ้า

== Transportation ==
Nowadays, Phlu Ta Luang is well known as the location of the Ban Phlu Ta Luang railway station, the terminus of the Eastern Line (section Ban Phlu Ta Luang Main Line) of the State Railway of Thailand (SRT).

The station serves two trains: ordinary 283/284 Bangkok–Ban Phlu Ta Luang–Bangkok (weekdays), and excursion train 997/998 Bangkok–Ban Phlu Ta Luang–Bangkok (only Saturday and Sunday with public holidays).
