= Sattahip Bay =

Sattahip Bay อ่าวสัตหีบ
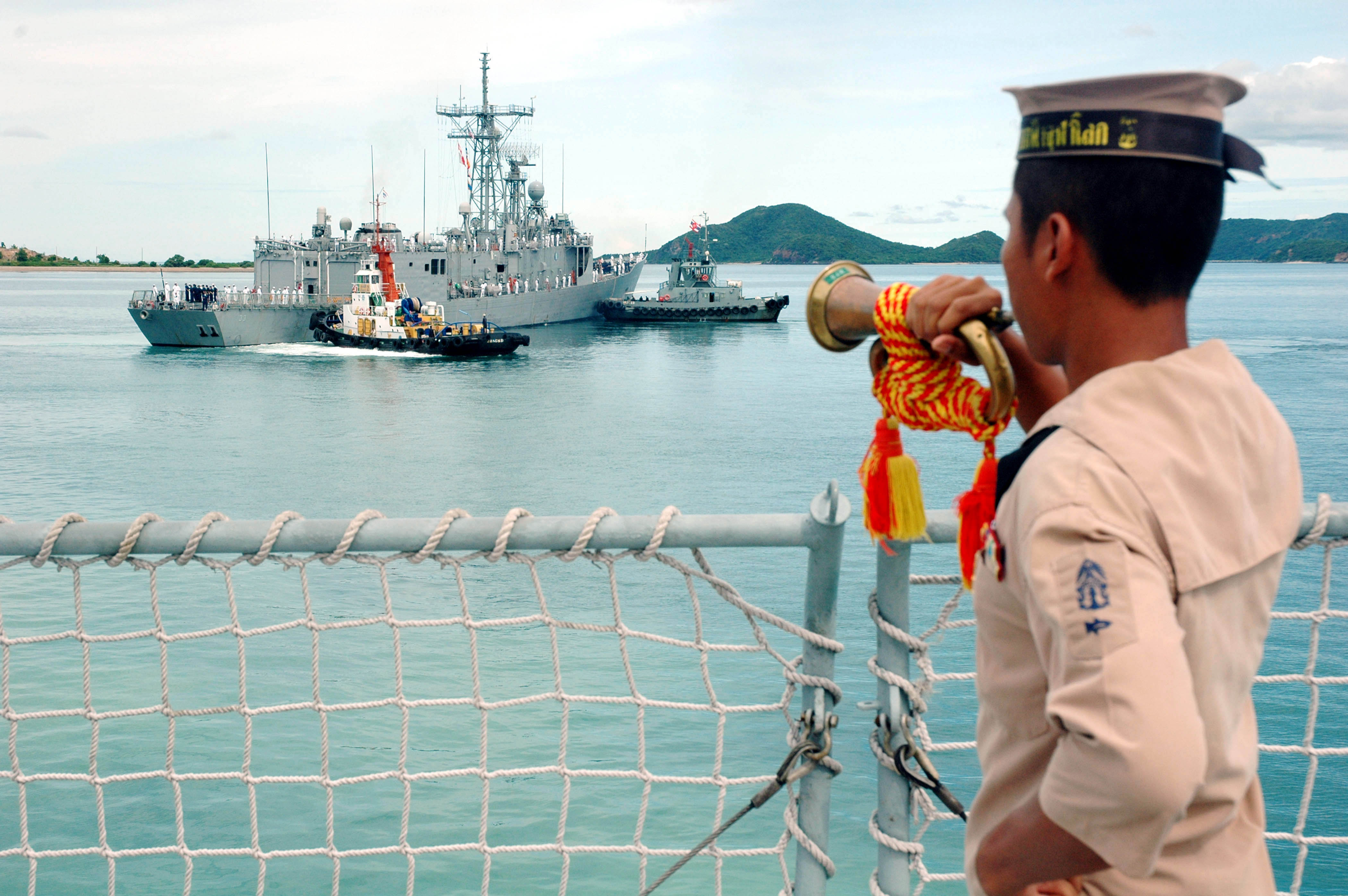
- A crew member of the Royal Thai Navy Ship HTMS Similan (187) renders a bugle salute to the guided missile frigate USS Jarrett (FFG-33) in Sattahip Bay.

- Location in the Bay of Bangkok
- Coordinates: 12°38′45″N 100°54′30″E
- Type: Marine bay
- Primary outflows: Gulf of Siam
- Basin countries: Thailand

Sattahip Bay (Thai: อ่าวสัตหีบ, RTGS: Ao Sattahip, pronounced [ʔàːw sàt.tā.hìːp]) is a bay in the east side of the Gulf of Siam or Gulf of Thailand. It is in Sattahip District, Chonburi Province, Thailand.

== History ==
Prince Abhakara Kiartivongse (1880–1923), son of King Chulalongkorn, inspected Sattahip Bay in 1922 and saw that it was an ideal place to establish a naval base. Subsequently, he offered royal land in Sattahip in order to build the present-day naval facilities.

Sattahip Bay is the part of the Sattahip Naval Base area, the largest base of the Royal Thai Navy.

Occasionally Sattahip Bay is invaded by jellyfish.

== Geography ==
Sattahip Bay lies at the south end of Chonburi Province. It is open towards the southwest and is bound by limestone rock formations forming peninsulas to the west over Laem Chalak and to the southeast at Khao Chong Khaep.

=== Islands ===
There are several islands in the bay area, the largest being Ko Tao Mo, towards the western end of the mouth of the bay. Smaller Ko I Lao is the island further off-shore.

Name	Thai Name	Location	Coordinates
Ko Tao Mo	เกาะเตาหม้อ	Sattahip Bay group	12°38′17″N 100°52′13″E
Ko Phra	เกาะพระ	Sattahip Bay group	12°38′37″N 100°53′17″E
Ko Phra Noi	เกาะพระน้อย	Sattahip Bay group	12°38′46″N 100°53′15″E
Ko I Lao	เกาะอีเลา	Sattahip Bay group	12°36′42″N 100°52′32″E
Ko Yo	เกาะยอ	Sattahip Bay group	12°36′59″N 100°52′52″E
Ko Mu	เกาะหมู	Sattahip Bay group	12°37′26″N 100°54′3″E
Ko Maeo	เกาะแมว	Sattahip Bay group	12°36′40″N 100°53′21″E
Ko Nang Ram	เกาะนางรำ	Sattahip Bay group	12°36′59″N 100°56′3″E
Ko Chorakhe	เกาะจระเข้	Sattahip Bay group	12°36′12″N 100°55′0″E

== See also ==
- List of islands of Thailand
