= Sattahip district =

Sattahip สัตหีบ
- District
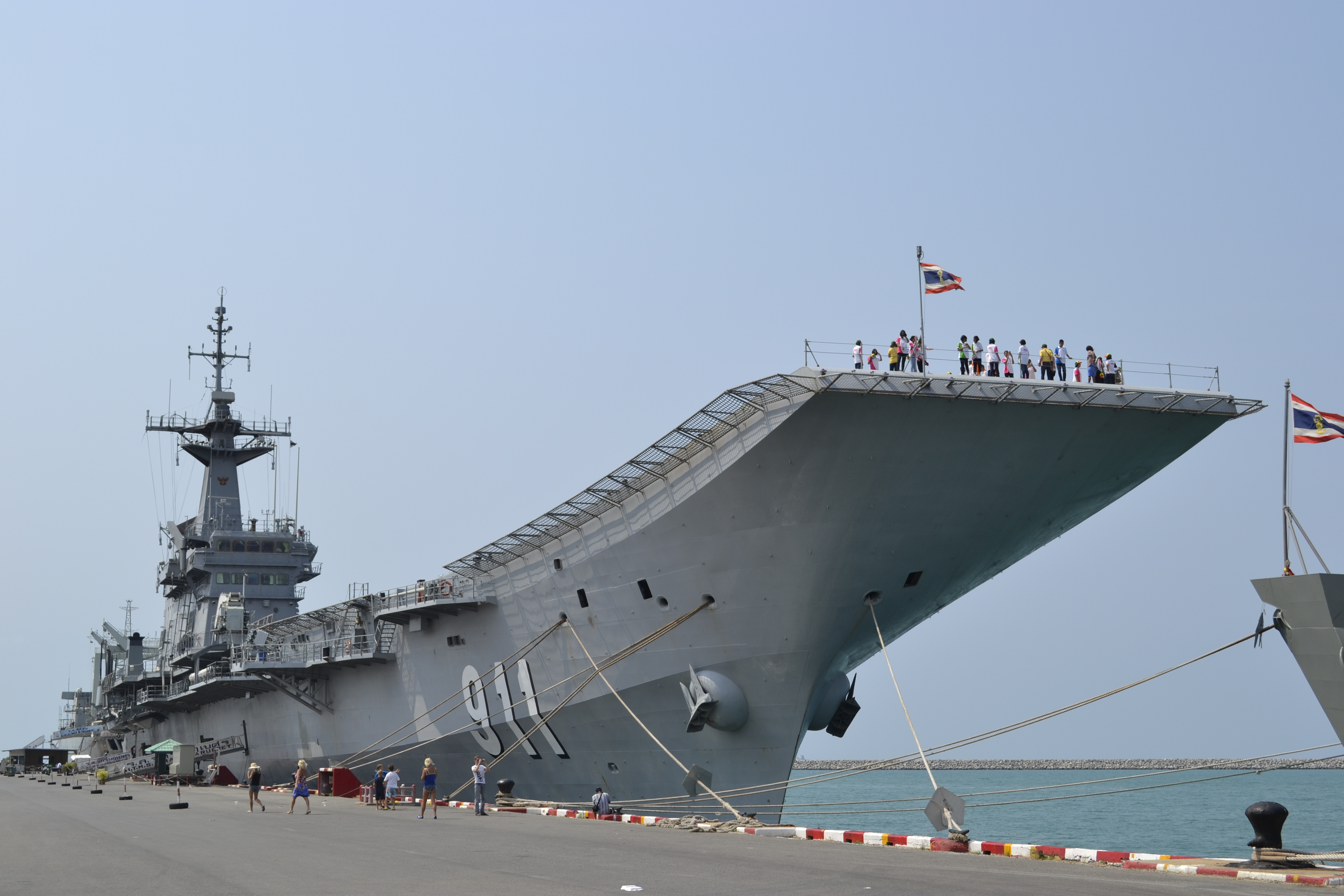
- HTMS Chakri Naruebet at Sattahip Naval Base

- District location in Chonburi province
- Coordinates: 12°39′47″N 100°54′20″E
- Country: Thailand
- Province: Chonburi
- Seat: Sattahip

Area
  - Total: 348.122 km^{2} (134.411 sq mi)

Population (2015)
  - Total: 159,395
  - Density: 457.87/km^{2} (1,185.9/sq mi)
- Time zone: UTC+7 (ICT)
- Postal code: 20180
- Geocode: 2009

Sattahip (Thai: สัตหีบ, pronounced [sàt.tā.hìːp]) is a district (amphoe) in Chonburi province, Thailand. It is at the southern tip of the province southeast of Bangkok. In 2014, the district had a population of 157,000 in an area of 348.122 km^{2}.

== Geography ==
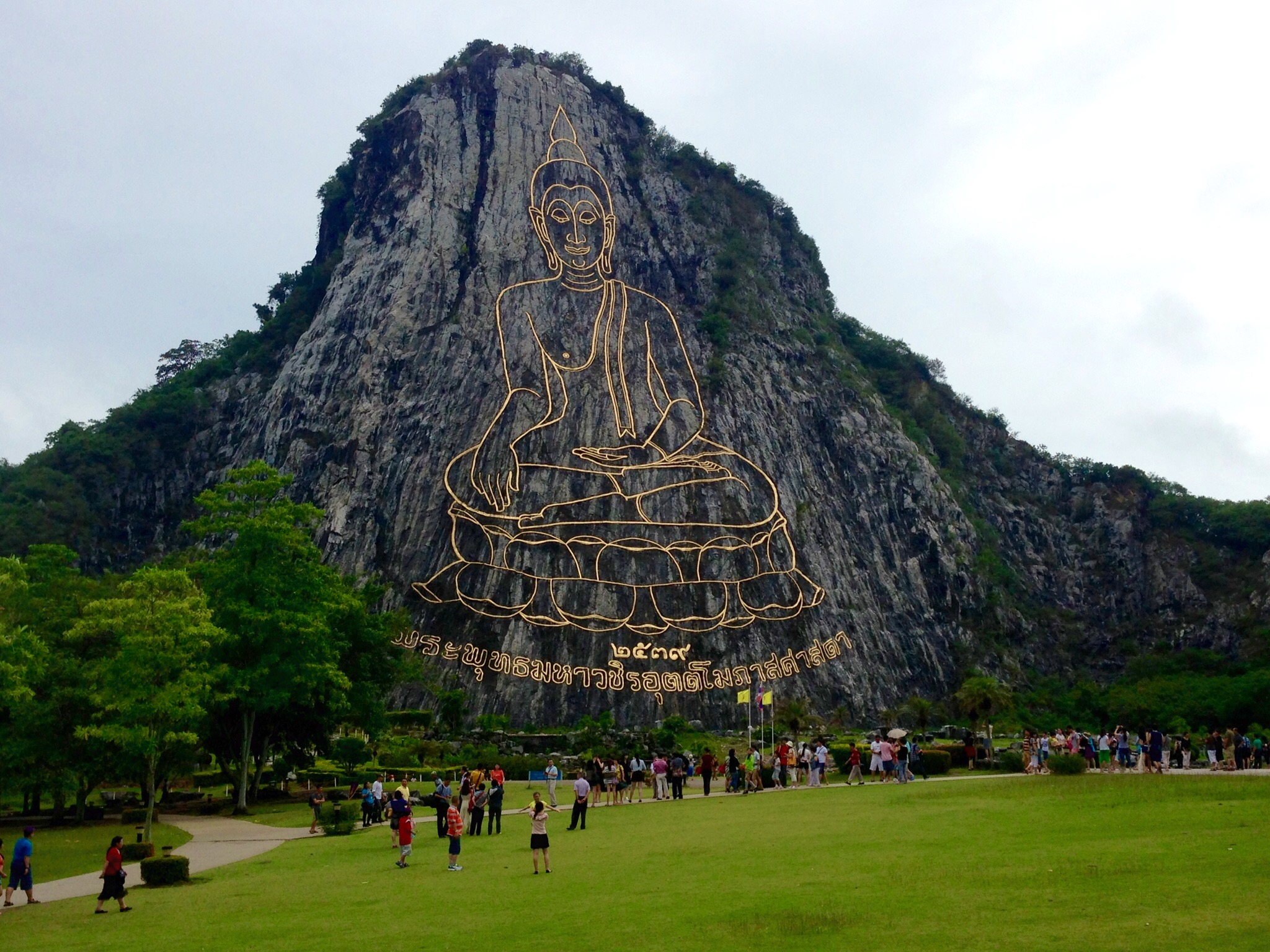
Khao Chi Chan, Sattahip district

Neighboring districts are Bang Lamung to the north, Ban Chang of Rayong province to the east, and the Gulf of Thailand to the south and west.

=== Islands ===
Several islands are in Sattahip District, the largest of which is Ko Khram Yai. Many of the islands are in Sattahip Bay (อ่าวสัตหีบ).

Name	Thai Name	Location	Coordinates
Ko Khram	เกาะคราม	Ko Khram group	12.70°N 100.79°E
Ko Klet Kaeo	เกาะเกล็ดแก้ว	Ko Khram group	12.761°N 100.845°E
Ko Khram Noi	เกาะครามน้อย	Ko Khram group	12.727°N 100.798°E
Ko I Ra	เกาะอีร้า	Ko Khram group	12.676°N 100.823°E
Ko Tao Mo	เกาะเตาหม้อ	Sattahip Bay group	12°38′17″N 100°52′13″E
Ko Phra	เกาะพระ	Sattahip Bay group	12°38′37″N 100°53′17″E
Ko Phra Noi	เกาะพระน้อย	Sattahip Bay group	12°38′46″N 100°53′15″E
Ko I Lao	เกาะอีเลา	Sattahip Bay group	12°36′42″N 100°52′32″E
Ko Yo	เกาะยอ	Sattahip Bay group	12°36′59″N 100°52′52″E
Ko Mu	เกาะหมู	Sattahip Bay group	12°37′26″N 100°54′3″E
Ko Maeo	เกาะแมว	Sattahip Bay group	12°36′40″N 100°53′21″E
Ko Nang Ram	เกาะนางรำ	Sattahip Bay group	12°36′59″N 100°56′3″E
Ko Chorakhe	เกาะจระเข้	Sattahip Bay group	12°36′12″N 100°55′0″E
Ko Samae San	เกาะแสมสาร	Ko Samae San group	12.573°N 100.95°E
Ko Kham	เกาะขาม	Ko Samae San group	12.573°N 100.934°E
Ko Raet	เกาะแรด	Ko Samae San group	12.585°N 100.964°E
Ko Chang Kluea		Ko Samae San group	12.550°N 100.971°E
Ko Chuang	เกาะช่วง	Ko Samae San group	12.520°N 100.96°E
Ko Chan	เกาะจาน	Ko Samae San group	12.521°N 100.970°E
Ko Rong Nang	เกาะโรงหนัง	Ko Samae San group	12.53437°N 100.95870°E
Ko Rong Khon	เกาะโรงโขน	Ko Samae San group	12.53169°N 100.95972°E

== History ==
The history of Sattahip begins with a woman named Jang, who owned much land in Sattahip District. Admiral Prince Abhakara Kiartivongse, a son of King Rama V, was sent to create a naval base at Sattahip. He thought it was perfect owing to the many small islands that protected it from wind and waves. He asked Jang for land on the seacoast, and she donated the area that the prince needed.

In Thai, satta (Thai: สัต) means 'seven', while hip (Thai: หีบ) means 'box' or 'barrier'. Thus, Sattahip means the 'seven barriers', which are the islands that protect the coast of the district. These islands are Ko Phra, Ko Yo, Ko Mu, Ko Tao Mo, Ko Nen, Ko San Chalam and Ko Bo.

The minor district (king amphoe) Sattahip was created on 1 April 1937 by separating the sub-districts Sattahip and Na Chom Thien from Bang Lamung district. It was upgraded to a full district in 1953.

== Climate ==
Climate data for Sattahip (1991–2020, extremes 1951-present)
Month	Jan	Feb	Mar	Apr	May	Jun	Jul	Aug	Sep	Oct	Nov	Dec	Year
Record high °C (°F)	36.5 (97.7)	39.2 (102.6)	39.5 (103.1)	40.5 (104.9)	40.5 (104.9)	37.5 (99.5)	37.0 (98.6)	37.2 (99.0)	36.2 (97.2)	36.2 (97.2)	36.5 (97.7)	36.4 (97.5)	40.5 (104.9)
Mean daily maximum °C (°F)	32.5 (90.5)	32.7 (90.9)	33.2 (91.8)	34.2 (93.6)	34.1 (93.4)	33.5 (92.3)	33.1 (91.6)	33.1 (91.6)	32.8 (91.0)	32.7 (90.9)	33.2 (91.8)	32.9 (91.2)	33.2 (91.8)
Daily mean °C (°F)	26.3 (79.3)	27.4 (81.3)	28.7 (83.7)	29.8 (85.6)	29.9 (85.8)	29.5 (85.1)	29.1 (84.4)	29.0 (84.2)	28.3 (82.9)	27.5 (81.5)	27.2 (81.0)	26.3 (79.3)	28.3 (82.9)
Mean daily minimum °C (°F)	21.4 (70.5)	23.0 (73.4)	24.9 (76.8)	26.1 (79.0)	26.2 (79.2)	26.0 (78.8)	25.7 (78.3)	25.8 (78.4)	25.0 (77.0)	24.0 (75.2)	22.8 (73.0)	21.3 (70.3)	24.35 (75.83)
Record low °C (°F)	12.3 (54.1)	13.6 (56.5)	16.5 (61.7)	18.6 (65.5)	21.7 (71.1)	21.7 (71.1)	19.1 (66.4)	19.8 (67.6)	21.5 (70.7)	18.0 (64.4)	15.0 (59.0)	11.2 (52.2)	11.2 (52.2)
Average precipitation mm (inches)	31.7 (1.25)	22.4 (0.88)	58.0 (2.28)	91.0 (3.58)	158.8 (6.25)	157.0 (6.18)	111.8 (4.40)	94.7 (3.73)	244.5 (9.63)	285.6 (11.24)	72.1 (2.84)	12.7 (0.50)	1,340.3 (52.77)
Average precipitation days (≥ 1.0 mm)	2.7	2.3	3.8	5.0	9.8	10.6	9.8	9.8	14.6	15.9	4.8	1.5	90.6
Average relative humidity (%)	74.4	75.8	77.1	76.6	77.9	77.6	77.7	77.7	81.5	83.3	76.0	71.2	77.2
Mean monthly sunshine hours	195.3	180.8	186.0	186.0	117.8	114.0	117.8	58.9	108.0	108.5	171.0	192.2	1,736.3
Mean daily sunshine hours	6.3	6.4	6.0	6.2	3.8	3.8	3.8	1.9	3.6	3.5	5.7	6.2	4.8
Source 1: World Meteorological Organization
Source 2: Office of Water Management and Hydrology, Royal Irrigation Department (sun 1981–2010) (extremes)

== Administration ==
The district is divided into five tambons, or sub-districts, which are further subdivided into 41 mubans, or villages. There are three thesaban tambons, or municipalities: Sattahip, Na Chom Thian, and Bang Sare. Sattahip covers parts of tambons Sattahip and Phlu Ta Luang. Na Chom Thian and Bang Sare each parts of the same-named tambon. There are a further five tambon administrative organizations.

No.	Name	Thai	Villages	Pop.
1.	Sattahip	สัตหีบ	9	72,715
2.	Na Chom Thian	นาจอมเทียน	9	11,555
3.	Phlu Ta Luang	พลูตาหลวง	8	30,355
4.	Bang Sare	บางเสร่	11	16,942
5.	Samaesan	แสมสาร	4	6,032
