= Invasion of Cambodia =

Invasion of Cambodia may refer to:

- Cambodian Campaign - the 1970 incursion into eastern Cambodia by US and South Vietnamese forces.
- Cambodian–Vietnamese War - the 1978 Vietnamese invasion of Cambodia.
- Franco-Thai War - the 1940-41 invasion of French Indochina via Laos and Cambodia.
