= Franco-Thai War =

1940–41 conflict in French Indochina

- Part of the South-East Asian theatre of World War II
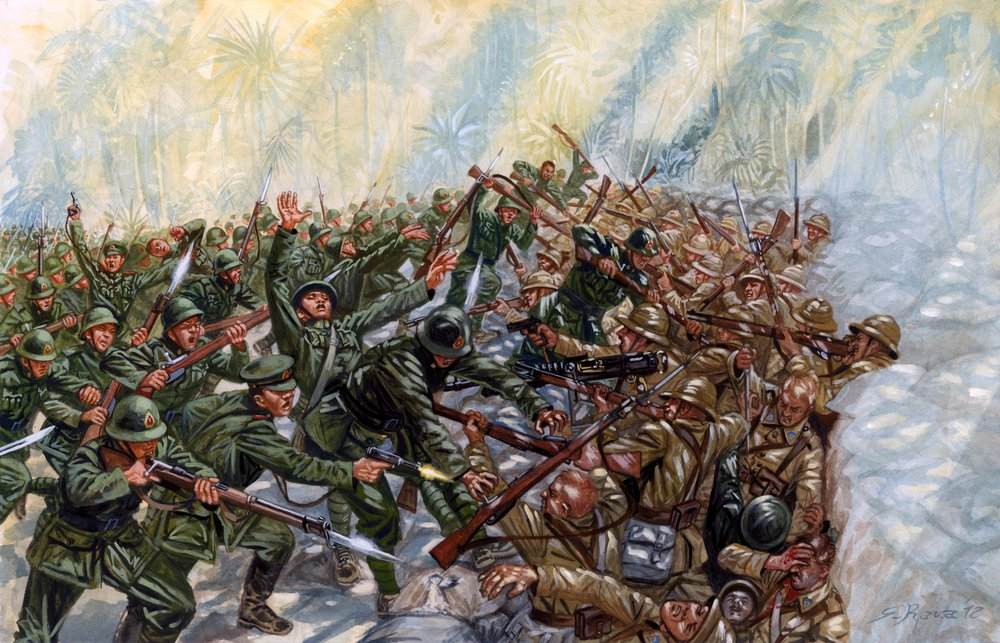
- Illustration of the Battle of Banphlao between the 3rd Battalion of Phra Nakhon Division, Burapha Army (now 2nd King Close Bodyguard Battalion, 1st King Close Bodyguard Regiment) and the 3rd Battalion of the 5th Foreign Regiment, French Foreign Legion (3/5e REI) at 16 January 1941.
Date	October 1940 – 28 January 1941 (Note: Fighting ended with a ceasefire on January 28 and the war formally ended with a peace treaty on May 9)
Location	French Indochina
Result	Indecisive: Japanese-mediated armistice
Territorial changes	Disputed territories in French Indochina ceded to Thailand

Belligerents
Vichy France: French Indochina	Thailand

Commanders and leaders
(Vichy France) Jean Decoux (Vichy France) Jean Robert de Rendiger (Vichy France) Yves de Boisboissel (Vichy France) Henri-Paul Jacomy (Vichy France) Jean Ferrand (Vichy France) François-Robert Bourdeau (Vichy France) Régis Bérenger	(Thailand) Plaek Phibunsongkhram (Thailand) Luang Atuegtevadej (Thailand) Luang Sinthusongkhramchai (Thailand) Luang Phromyothi (Thailand) Luang Kriangsakphichit (Thailand) Luang Senanarong

Strength
50,000 men 20 light tanks 100 aircraft 1 light cruiser 4 avisos	60,000 men 134 tanks 140 aircraft 3 coastal defense ships 12 torpedo boats 4 submarines

Casualties and losses
Land: 321 killed or wounded 178 missing 20-222 captured 22 aircraft destroyed Sea: 11 killed Total: 721+ casualties	Land: 54 killed 374 wounded 21 captured 8–13 aircraft destroyed Sea: 36-300 killed 3 torpedo boats sunk 1 coastal defense ship grounded Total: 418-703+ casualties

The Franco-Thai War (October 1940 – 28 January 1941, Thai: กรณีพิพาทอินโดจีน, romanized: Karani Phiphat Indochin; French: Guerre franco-thaïlandaise) was fought between Thailand and Vichy France over certain areas of French Indochina.

Negotiations shortly before World War II had shown that the French government was willing to alter the boundaries between Thailand and French Indochina, but only slightly. Following the Fall of France in 1940, Major-General Plaek Phibunsongkhram (popularly known as "Phibun"), the prime minister of Thailand, decided that France's defeat strengthened the Thais' negotiating position to regain the vassal state territories that were ceded to France during King Chulalongkorn's reign.

The German and Italian military occupation of Metropolitan France rendered France's hold on French Indochina and its other overseas territories tenuous. The colonial administration was cut off from outside help and supplies. After the invasion of French Indochina in September 1940, Japan forced the French to allow them to set up military bases. The seemingly subservient behavior of the French lulled the Phibun regime into believing that France would not seriously resist a military confrontation by Thailand.

== Background ==
The events of Franco-Siamese Crisis of 1893 (Rattanakosin Era R.S.112) and Franco-Siamese Treaty of 1907 ended with Siam losing the territories of Laos and Cambodia to France. The crisis was seen as a national humiliation according to "Lost Territories" narrative but available political actions and negotiation attempt between Siam and Western Powers were limited.

After Siamese Revolution and Boworadet Rebellion Siam were under Khana Ratsadon control. However, the uneasy alliance between Civilian and Military wings of Khana Ratsadon led to the consolidation of political and military powers to the militarist wing under Colonel Phraya Phahonphonphayuhasena in June 1933 Siamese coup d'état.

On 3 October 1936, Marcel Rey - French Minister in Siam have reported about Siamese newspaper publishing irredentist articles about the French occupation of Cambodian provinces while the Siamese government has voted for a credit of 30 million Baht for over five years for strategic road construction towards Indochinese border.

In Early 1939, French Indochina, seeing Siam as a threat, tries to appease Siam by exchanging military missions while noting the increase of Siamese military movements and Japanese officials in the northeastern regions (Isan) of Siam.

Later Phraya Phahon would make way for Minister of Defense Plaek Phibunsongkhram as a new leader of the militarist wing of Khana Ratsadon Government on 16 December 1938 making Phibun the new Prime Minister of Siam. Phibun then assigned Luang Wichitwathakan to implement state propaganda towards reclaiming lost territories from French Indochina and British Burma and reunite Tai Race under newly created "Thailand" (Renamed from Siam to Thailand on 23/24 June 1939).

During the Battle of France, the French government has decided to sign a non-aggression treaty with Thailand on 12 June 1940 regarding of mutual respect on Thai and French territorial integrity with a joint commission to inspect the borders between Thailand and French Indochina just few days before the total collapse of Metropolitan France to the invading German forces on 17 June 1940. At the same time Thailand also signed a non-aggression treaty with the British Empire and Japanese Empire on 12 June resulting in Anglo-Thai Non-Aggression Pact of 1940 and Treaty between Thailand and Japan Concerning the Continuance of Friendly Relations and the Mutual Respect of Each Other's Territorial Integrity respectively.

Fall of France and the Armistice of 22 June 1940 led to the creation of Vichy Regime in Southern France. Vichy government then inherited its control over French colonial territories in both Africa and Asia. With weakened status of the French state both Phibun and the Japanese Empire saw opportunities in Indochina. For Thais to reclaim their lost territories and for the Japanese to create a starting point for their conquest of Southeast Asia.

Late September 1940, Japanese forces launched attacks on French Indochinese positions along the border with China supported by aircraft from aircraft carriers in Gulf of Tonkin area. Lạng Sơn is captured by the Japanese troops thus starting the Japanese Invasion of Indochina. An invasion would gradually progress in phases from September to December 1940 but an armed military actions only contained in September 1940.

Phibun personally gave a speech at the student's political rally on 8 October 1940 in front of Ministry of Defence and the Grand Palace for Chulalongkorn and Thammasat students with cheering crowds who came to support the cause for reclaiming Indochinese territories from France followed by an oath taking ceremony.

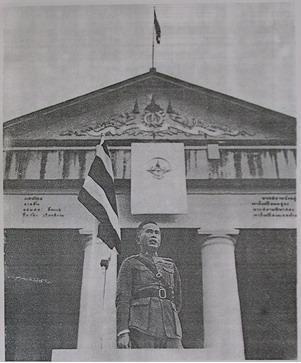
Plaek Phibunsongkhram giving speech in front of the Ministry of Defence regarding of the lost territories of Indochina.

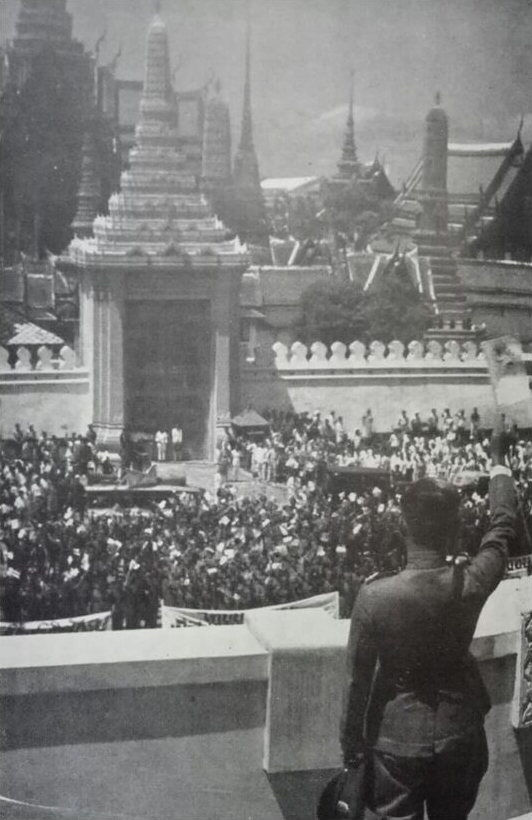
Plaek Phibunsongkram giving a speech to Chulalongkorn and Thammasat students at the Grand Palace, 8 October 1940.

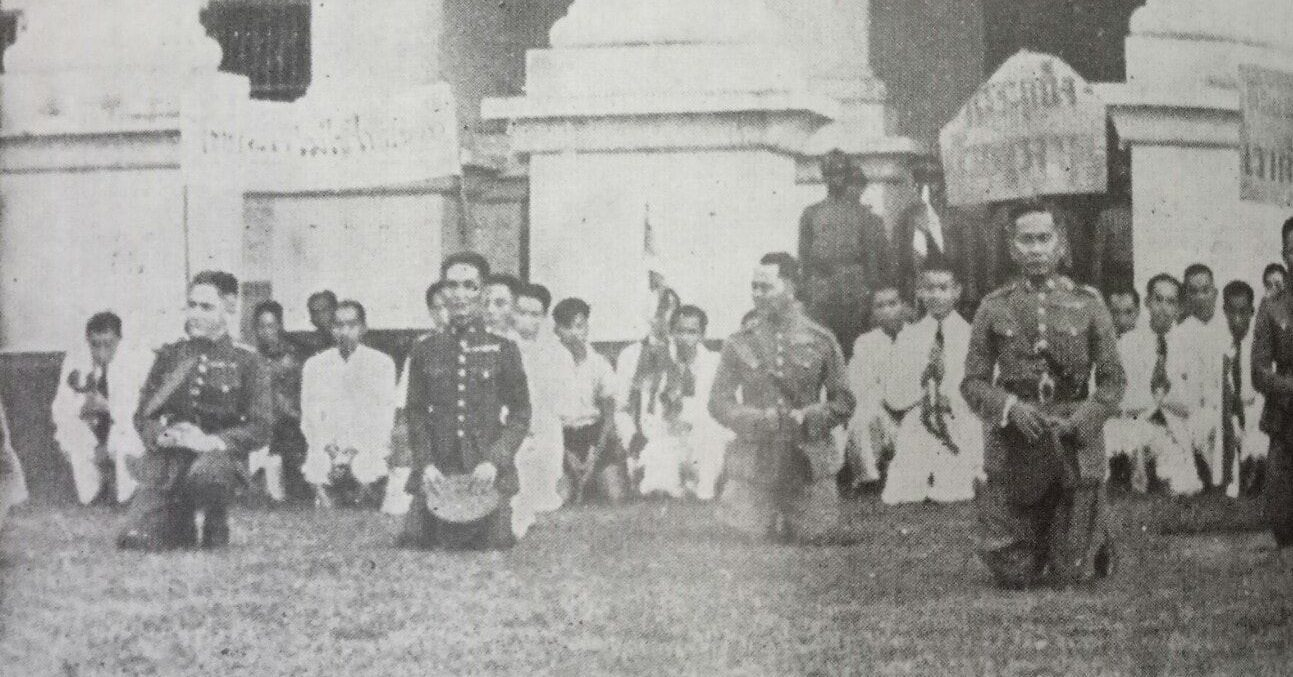
Plaek Phibunsongkram with Chulalongkorn and Thammasat students took an oath in front of the Emerald Buddha in front of the Ministry of Defence, 8 October 1940.

== Forces ==
=== French ===
The Vichy French Army in Indochina consisted of approximately 50,000 men, 12,000 of whom were French, organized into forty-one infantry battalions, two artillery regiments, and a battalion of engineers. The Vichy French Army had a shortage of armor, and it could field only 20 Renault FT tanks against the nearly one hundred Royal Thai Army armored vehicles. The bulk of the French forces stationed near the Thai border consisted of the Indochinese infantry of the 3rd and 4th Regiments of Tonkinese Rifles (Tirailleurs Tonkinois), together with a battalion of Montagnards (indigenous Vietnamese highlanders), French regulars of the Colonial Infantry (Troupes coloniales), and French Foreign Legion units.

The Vichy French Navy only had the light cruiser Lamotte-Picquet and four small avisos in French Indochina.

The Vichy French Air Force (Armée de l'Air) had approximately 100 aircraft, of which roughly 60 could be considered front-line. These included thirty Potez 25 TOE reconnaissance/fighter-bombers, four Farman 221 heavy bombers, six Potez 542 bombers, nine Morane-Saulnier M.S.406 fighters, and eight Loire 130 reconnaissance/bomber flying boats.

=== Thai ===
The slightly larger Royal Thai Army was a relatively well-equipped force. Consisting of 60,000 men, it was made up of three armies. The largest were the "Burapha Army" with five divisions, the "Isan Army" with three divisions and "Independent formations" under direct control of the army high command included two motorized cavalry battalions, one artillery battalion, one signals battalion, one engineer battalion, and one armored regiment. The artillery was a mixture of Krupp guns and modern Bofors guns and howitzers, while 60 Carden Loyd tankettes and 30 Vickers 6-ton tanks made up the bulk of the army's tank force.

The Royal Thai Navy included two Thonburi-class coastal defense ships, HTMS Thonburi and HTMS Sri Ayudhya, 12 torpedo boats, and four Japanese-made submarines. In spite of its numerical superiority and more recent boats, Royal Thai Navy was arguably inferior to the French naval forces in Southeast Asia.

The Royal Thai Air Force held both a quantitative and qualitative edge over the local Armée de l'Air units. Among the 140 aircraft that composed the Royal Thai Air Force's first-line strength were 24 Mitsubishi Ki-30 light bombers, nine Mitsubishi Ki-21 heavy bombers, 25 Curtiss Hawk 75N fighter planes, six Martin B-10 medium bombers, and 70 Vought O2U Corsair observation/attack aircraft.

== Campaign ==
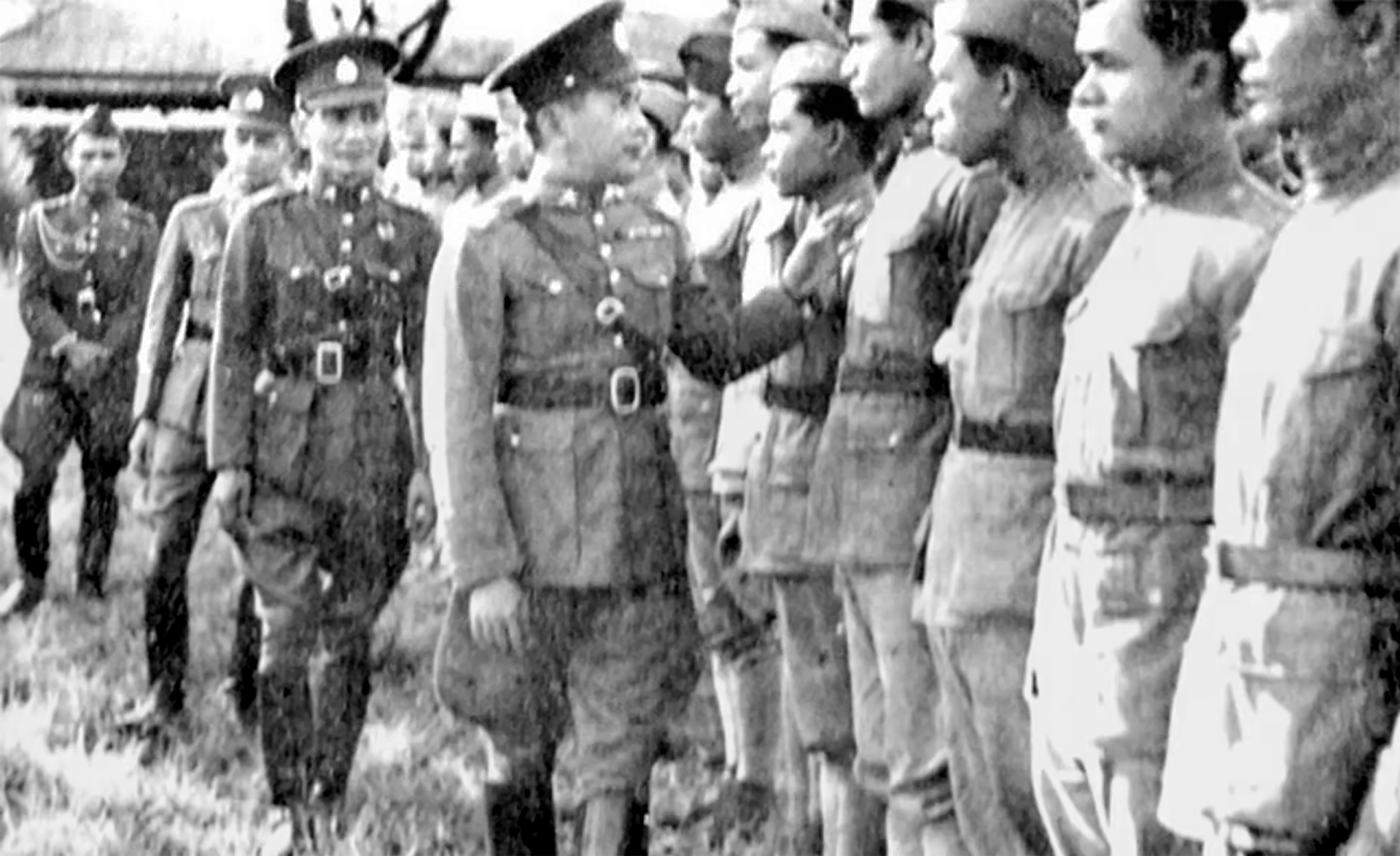
Plaek Phibunsongkhram inspects Thai Troops 1941

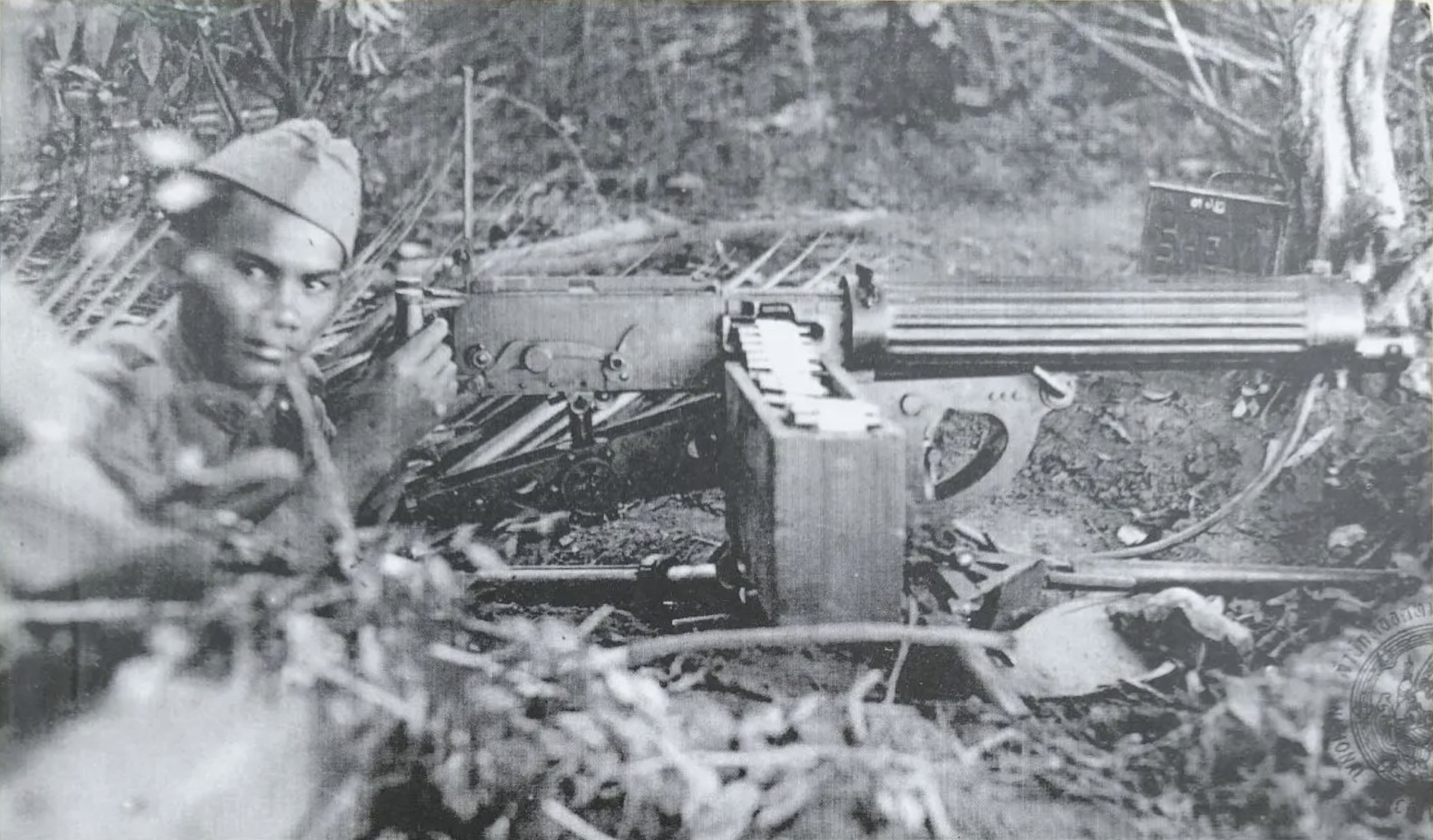
Thai soldier with a Type 77 Vickers Machine Gun, 16 January 1941

While nationalist demonstrations and anti-French rallies, supported by groups such as Khana Lueat Thai, were being held in Bangkok, several border skirmishes erupted along the Mekong frontier. The superior Royal Thai Air Force then conducted daytime bombing runs over military targets in Vientiane, Phnom Penh, Sisophon, and Battambang with impunity. The French retaliated with their own air attacks, but the damage they caused was less than equal. The activities of the Thai air force, particularly in the field of dive-bombing, was such that Admiral Jean Decoux, the governor of French Indochina, grudgingly remarked that the Thai planes seemed to have been flown by men with plenty of combat experience.

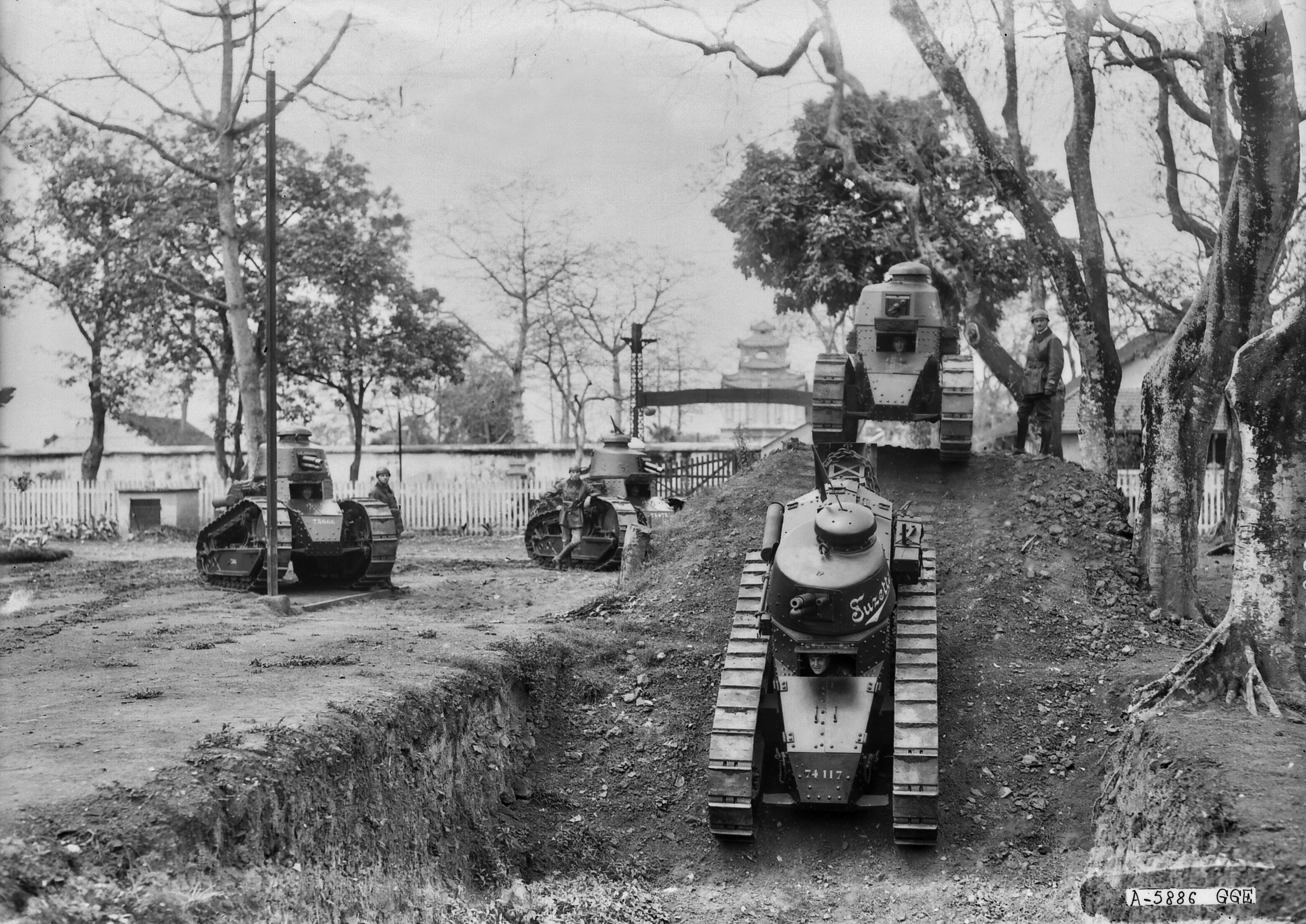
French troops used a handful of World War I–era Renault FT tanks during the conflict.

On 5 January 1941, following the report of a French attack on the Thai border town of Aranyaprathet, the Thai Burapha and Isan Armies launched an offensive on Laos and Cambodia. French response was instantaneous, but many units were simply swept aside by the better-equipped Thai forces. The Thai army swiftly overran Laos, but the French forces in Cambodia managed to rally and offer more resistance.

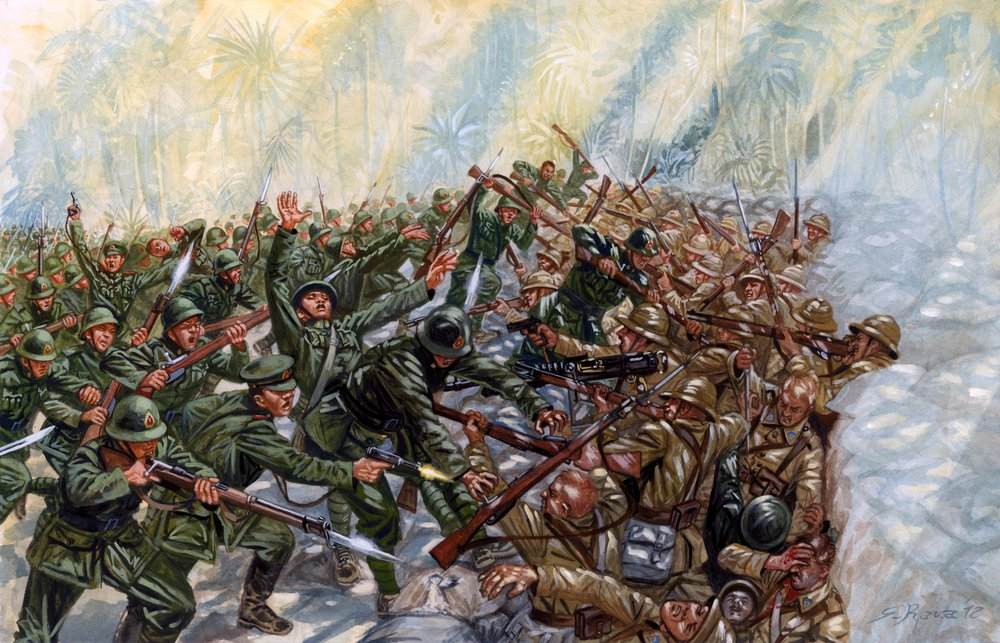
Illustration of the Battle of Banphlao between the 3rd Battalion of Phra Nakhon Division, Burapha Army (now 2nd King Close Bodyguard Battalion, 1st King Close Bodyguard Regiment) and the 3rd Battalion of the 5th Foreign Regiment, French Foreign Legion (3/5e REI) at 16 January 1941. (Painted by Giuseppe Rava)

At dawn on 16 January, the French launched a large counterattack on the Thai-held villages of Yang Dang Khum and Phum Preav, initiating the fiercest battle of the war. Due to poor coordination and nonexistent intelligence against the entrenched and well-prepared Thai forces, the French operation was stopped and fighting ended with a French retreat from the area. However, the Thais were unable to pursue the retreating French, as their forward tanks were kept in check by the gunnery of French Foreign Legion artillery.

The naval Battle of Ko Chang,17 January 1941

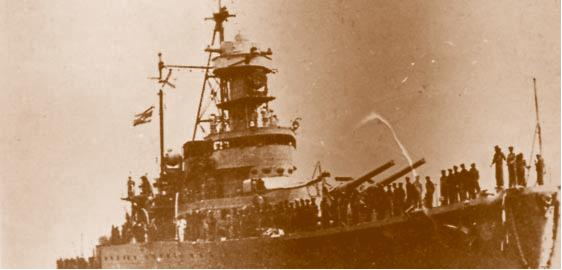
Coastal Defense Ship HTMS Thonburi 4 days before the Battle of Ko Chang, January 1941

With the situation on land rapidly deteriorating for the French, Admiral Decoux ordered all available French naval forces into action in the Gulf of Thailand. In the early morning of 17 January, a French naval squadron caught a Thai naval detachment by surprise at anchor off Ko Chang island. The subsequent Battle of Ko Chang was a tactical victory for the French and resulted in the sinking of two Thai torpedo boats and the disabling of a coastal defense ship, with the French suffering no casualties.

On 24 January, the final air battle took place when Thai bombers raided the French airfield at Angkor, near Siem Reap. The last Thai bombing mission on Phnom Penh commenced at 07:10 on 28 January, when the Martins of the 50th Bomber Squadron set out on a raid on Sisophon, escorted by thirteen Hawk 75Ns of the 60th Fighter Squadron. Japan wanted to maintain both its working relationship with Vichy and Thai, because Japanese intention was to use Thailand and Indochina as their military base to invade Burma and Malaya. The Japanese intervened, proposing an armistice between Thai and Vichy French be signed.

== Armistice ==
Japan subsequently stepped in to mediate the conflict. A general ceasefire had been arranged to go into effect at 10:00 on 28 January, and a Japanese-sponsored "Conference for the Cessation of Hostilities" was held at Saigon, with preliminary documents for an armistice between the governments of Marshal Philippe Pétain's French State and the Kingdom of Thailand signed aboard the cruiser Natori on 31 January 1941. On 9 May, a peace treaty was signed in Tokyo, with the French being coerced by the Japanese to relinquish their hold on the disputed border territories. France ceded the following provinces to Thailand from Cambodia and Laos:

- Battambang and Pailin, which were reorganized as Phra Tabong Province
- Siem Reap, Banteay Meanchey and Oddar Meanchey, which were reorganized as Phibunsongkhram Province
- Preah Vihear, which was merged with a part of Champassak Province of Laos opposite Pakse to form Nakhon Champassak Province
- Xaignabouli, including part of Luang Prabang Province, which was renamed Lan Chang Province
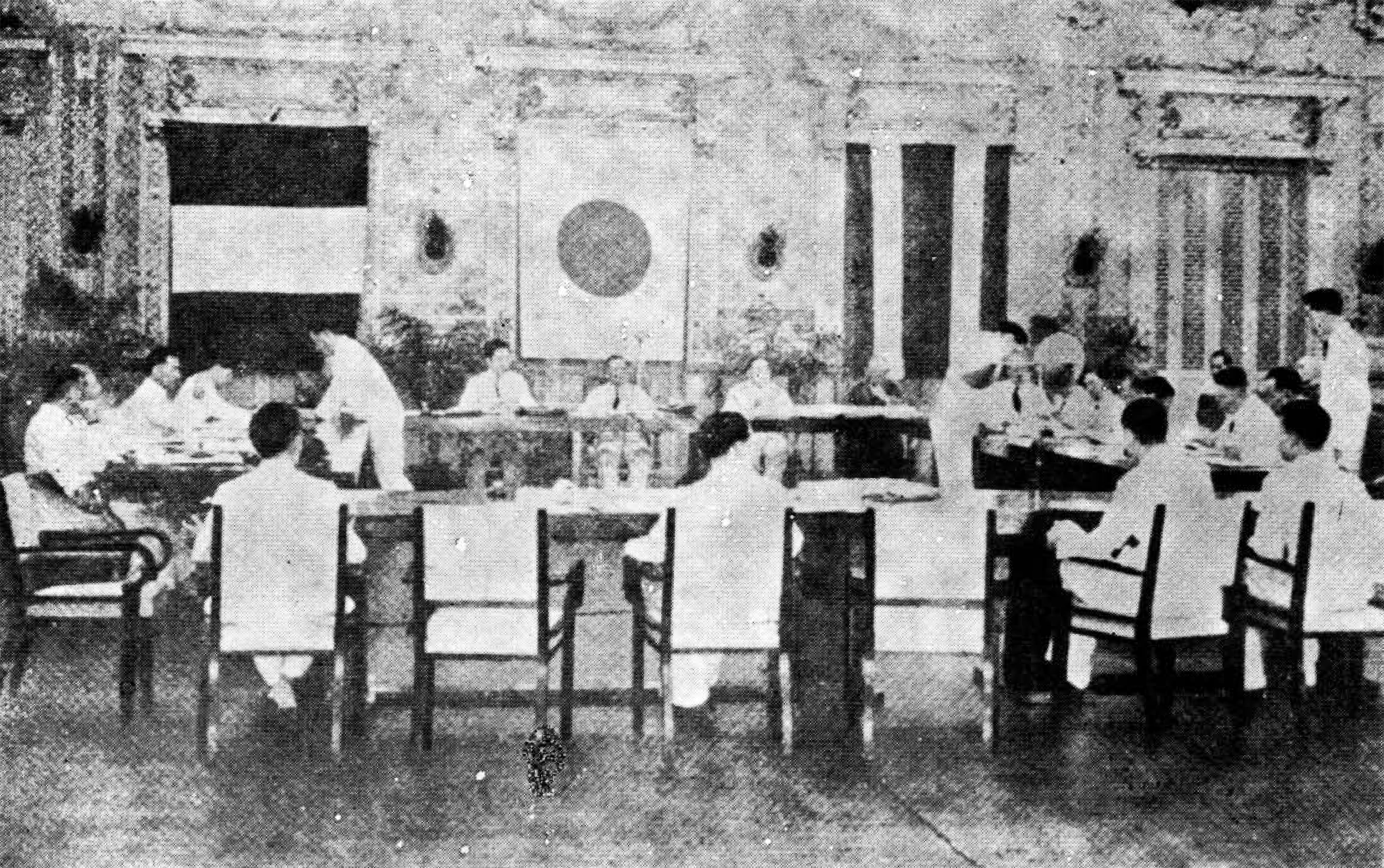
The 4th meeting of the French-Japanese-Thai Delimitation Commission at the Sài Gòn City Hall, 1941.

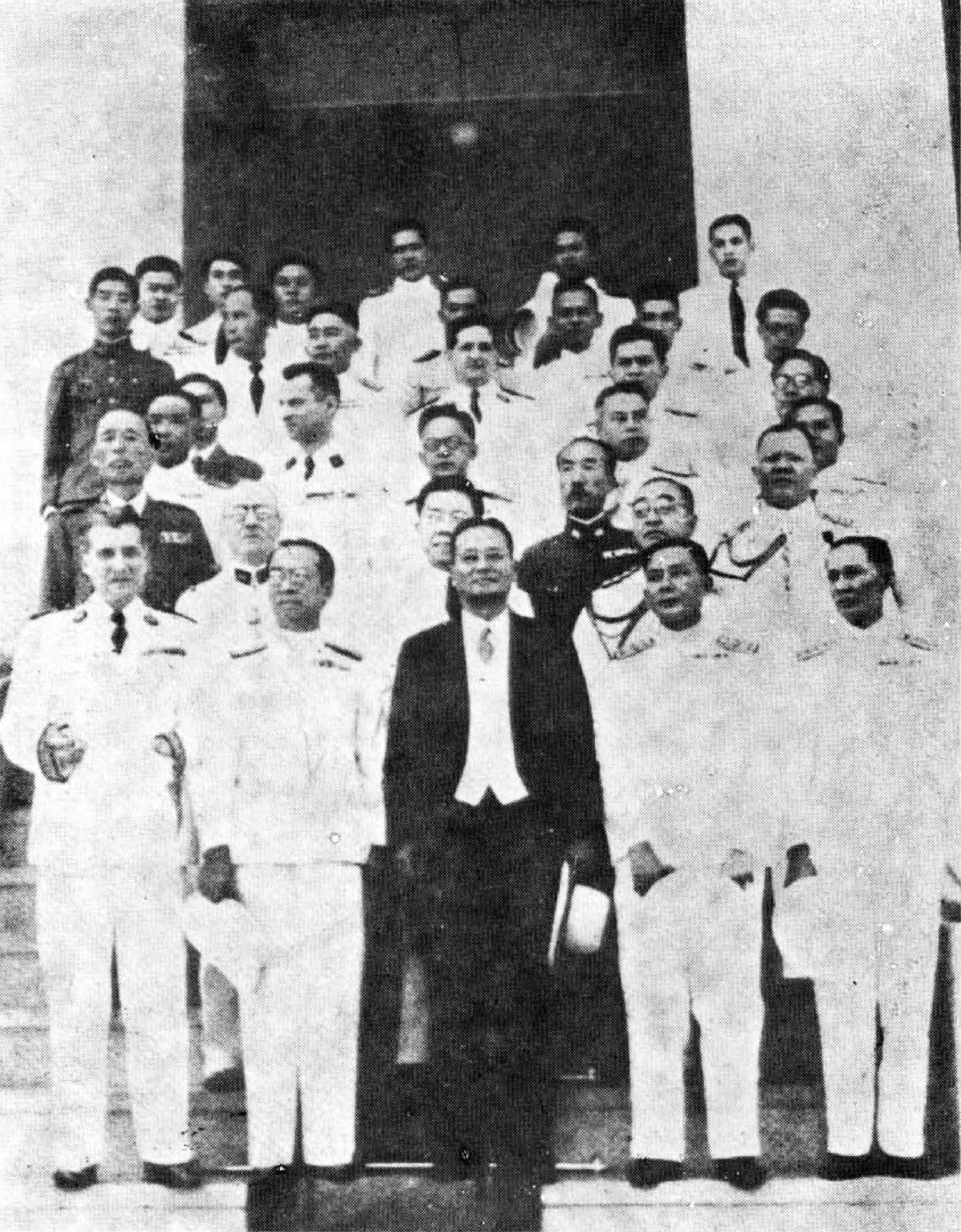
A group photograph of the Thai-French Delimitation Commission, shot at the Chulalongkorn University Auditorium after its 5th meeting, 7 August 1942.

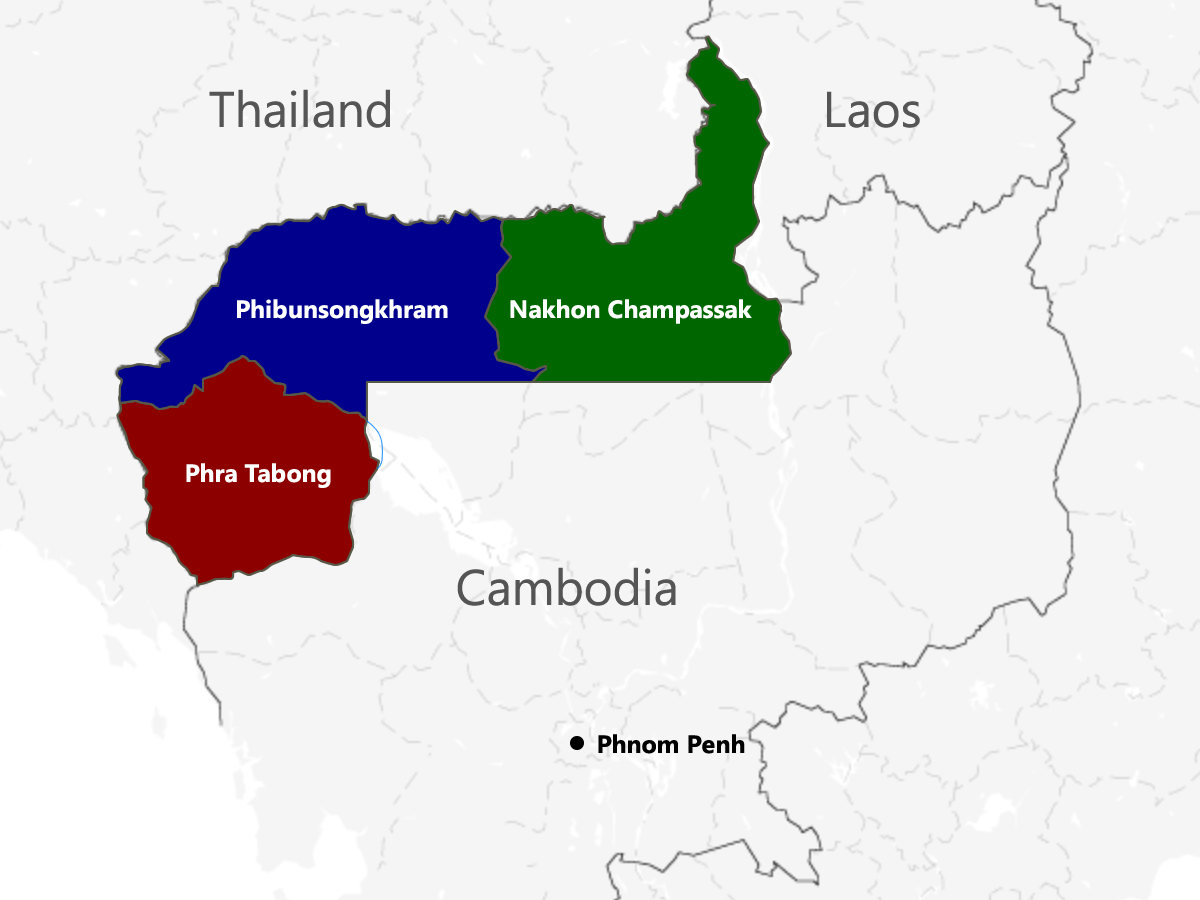
Provinces ceded from French protectorate of Cambodia and French protectorate of Laos to Thailand were regrouped into new Thai provinces: Phra Tabong, Phibunsongram, and Nakhon Champassak.

Larger map including territories ceded from French protectorate of Laos.

== Treaty ==
The war was considered a victory for Thailand, as it fulfilled the objective of recovering territories lost under the Franco-Siamese Treaty of 1907. The resolution of the conflict was widely acclaimed by the people of Thailand, and was seen as a personal triumph for Phibun. For the first time in its history, Thailand had been able to extract concessions from a European power, albeit a weakened one. For the French in French Indochina, the conflict was a bitter reminder of their isolation after the Fall of France. They felt that an ambitious neighbor had taken advantage of a distant colony being cut off from a weakened parent. Without hope of reinforcements, the French had little chance of offering a sustained resistance.

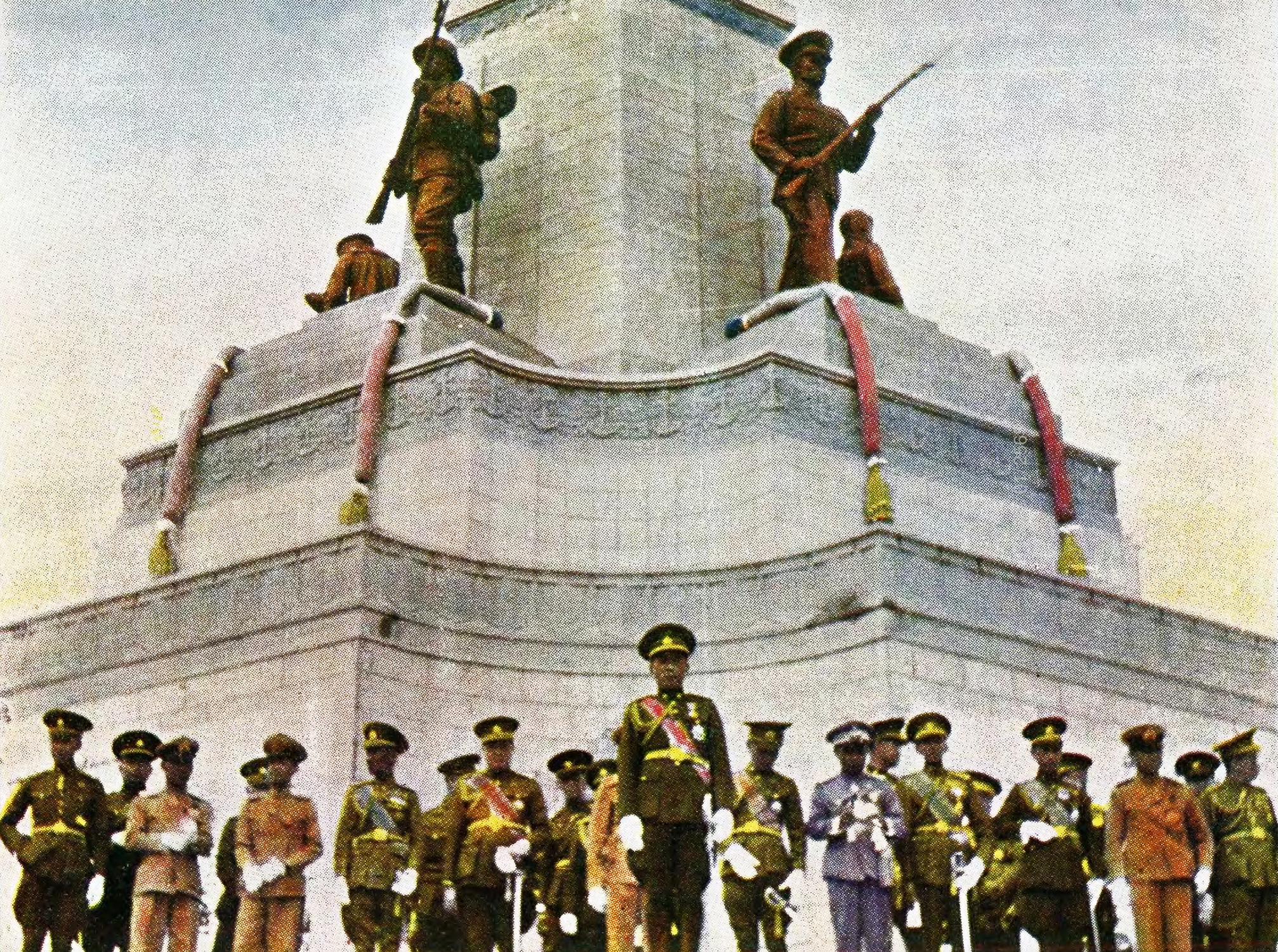
Opening ceremony of the Victory Monument built to commemorate the Franco-Thai War in June 1942.

To commemorate the victory, Phibun erected the Victory Monument in Bangkok. Thailand invited Japan and Germany to join in the celebration of its construction.

The Japanese wanted to maintain both their working relationship with Vichy and the status quo; therefore, the Thais were forced to accept only a quarter of the territory that they gained from the French, in addition to having to pay six million piastres as a concession to the French.

However, the real beneficiaries of the conflict were the Japanese, who were able to expand their influence in both Thailand and Indochina. The Japanese wanted to use Thailand and Indochina as their military bases to invade British Burma and British Malaya later. The Japanese won from Phibun a secret oral promise to support them in an attack on Malaya and Burma. Phibun did not keep his word.

Relations between Japan and Thailand were subsequently stressed, as a disappointed Phibun switched to courting the British and Americans to ward off what he saw as an imminent Japanese invasion. However, on 8 December 1941, the Japanese invaded Thailand at the same time as the Japanese invasion of Malaya. Pearl Harbor was attacked one-and-a-half hours after Malaya and Thailand were. Fighting between Japanese and Thai forces lasted only five hours before a ceasefire was agreed. Thailand would be allied with Japan until 1945.

After the war, in October 1946, northwestern Cambodia and the two Lao enclaves on the Thai side of the Mekong River were returned to French sovereignty when the French provisional government threatened to veto Thailand's membership in the United Nations. This led to the conclusion of the Franco-Siamese Settlement Treaty of 1946 that settled the issue and paved the way to restoration of diplomatic relations between the two countries.

== Casualties ==
The French army suffered a total of 321 casualties, of whom 15 were officers. The total number of missing after 28 January was 178 (six officers, 14 non-commissioned officers and 158 enlisted men). The Thais had captured 222 men (17 North Africans, 80 Frenchmen, and 125 Indochinese).and claimed after Battle of Banphlao, many French troops were captured while 400 French soldiers were killed.

The Thai army suffered 54 men killed in action and 307 wounded. 41 sailors and marines of the Thai navy were killed, and 67 wounded. At the Battle of Ko Chang, 36 men were killed, of whom 20 belonged to HTMS Thonburi, 14 to Torpedo Boat Destroyer HTMS Songkhla, and two to Torpedo Boat Destroyer HTMS Chonburi. The Thai air force lost 13 men. The number of Thai military personnel captured by the French was just 21.

About 30 percent of the French aircraft were rendered unserviceable by the end of the war, some as a result of minor damage sustained in air raids that remained unrepaired. The Armée de l'Air admitted the loss of one Farman F221 and two Morane M.S.406s destroyed on the ground, but its losses were really greater.

In its first experience of combat, the Royal Thai Air Force claimed to have shot down five French aircraft and destroyed 17 on the ground, against the loss of three of its own in the air and another five to 10 destroyed in French air raids on Thai airfields.

Some Renault UE Chenillette and French infantry weapons were captured after the war. At least two UE Tankettes were located in Thailand one at Royal Thai Army Ordnance Museum (Which several French weapons were put onto display) and another one in running conditions at Camp Adisorn Cavalry Center, Saraburi.

== Thai Order of Battle ==
Source: Most of the Formation is taken from อนุสรณ์ในงานพระราชทานเพลิงศพ พลเอก พลเรือเอก พลอากาศเอก หลวงสุทธิสารรณกรณ เมรุหน้าพลับพลาอิสริยาภรณ์ วัดเทพศิรินทราวาส 5 มิถุนายน 2511 while some other units are taken from Supanat Vongsirithorn's (Owner of Siam Historical Cafe/2483 Reenactment Group) personal research. Some units were incorporated from user Wisarut on Axis History Forum.

Royal Thai Army Headquarters – Major General Luang Phibunsongkhram (พลตรี หลวงพิบูลสงคราม)

- Thonburi Division (กองพลธนบุรี) – Lieutenant Colonel Luang Pikhatporapak (พันโท หลวงพิฆาตปรปักษ์)
- Saraburi Division (กองพลสระบุรี) – Major Sudjai Poonsap (พันตรี สุดใจ พูนทรัพย์)
- Phetchaburi Division (กองพลเพชรบุรี) – Lieutenant Colonel Luang Dechronnarong (พันโท หลวงเดชรณรงค์)
- Bangkok Combined Division (กองพลผสมพระนคร) (?) - Unknown Commander
  - 1st Cavalry Battalion (Bangkok) (กองพันทหารม้าที่ 1) - Unknown Commander The unit exclusively uses Australian stallions.
  - 16th Artillery Battalion (Lopburi) (กองพันทหารปืนใหญ่ที่ 16) - Unknown Commander
  - 4th Engineer Battalion (กองพันทหารช่างที่ 4) - Unknown Commander
  - 7th Engineer Battalion (Ayutthaya) (กองพันทหารช่างที่ 7) - Unknown Commander
  - Fighting Vehicle Group (กองรถรบ) Notable Soldiers including Cadet Prem Tinsulanonda (เปรม ติณสูลานนท์) who fought as an Armor Platoon Leader and promoted to Acting Second Lieutenant while operating in the field during battle for Poipet.
  - 1st Fighting Vehicle Battalion (กองพันรถรบที่ 1) - Major Saghad Rattanarankha (พันตรี สงัด รัตนรังคะ).
  - Communications Group (กองทหารสื่อสาร)

Burapha Army (กองทัพบูรพา, Eastern Army) – Colonel Luang Phromyothi (Mangkorn Phromyothi) (พันเอก หลวงพรหมโยธี) Deputy Commander - Colonel Phin Choonhavan (พันเอก ผิน ชุณหะวัณ)

Prachin Combined Division (กองพลผสมปราจีน)

- 5th Infantry Battalion (Hat Yai) (กองพันทหารราบที่ 5) - Unknown Commander
- 8th Infantry Battalion (Lopburi) (กองพันทหารราบที่ 8) - Unknown Commander
- 45th Infantry Battalion (Phetchaburi) (กองพันทหารราบที่ 45) - Unknown Commander
- 31st Infantry Battalion (Chiang Mai) (Reserves) (กองพันทหารราบที่ 31 สำรอง) - Unknown Commander
- One artillery battalion - Unknown Commander
- Wattana Division (กองพลวัฒนา) (Watthana Nakhon) – Lieutenant Colonel Luang Paireerayordech (พันโท หลวงไพรีระย่อเดช)
- Chantaburi Marine Division (กองพลจันทบุรี) - Lieutenant Commander Thonglor Khamhiran (นาวาตรี ทองหล่อ ขำหิรัญ) Attacking Battambang through Pailin. (Assigned to Wattana Division)
  - 1st Marine Battalion (Thonburi) (กองพันทหารราบที่ 1 นาวิกโยธิน) - Lieutenant commander Luang Athukyothin (นาวาตรี หลวงอธึกโยธิน)
  - 2nd Marine Battalion (Sattahip) (กองพันทหารราบที่ 2 นาวิกโยธิน) - Lieutenant commander Sant Santiwasa (นาวาตรี สันต์ สันติวาสะ)
  - 3rd Marine Battalion (Sattahip) (กองพันทหารราบที่ 3 นาวิกโยธิน) - Lieutenant commander Thieng Satienthai (นาวาตรี เที่ยง เสถียรไทย)
  - Marine Artillery Battalion (กองพันทหารปืนใหญ่นาวิกโยธิน) - Captain Pradit Poolket (ร้อยเอก ประดิษฐ์ พูลเกษ)
  - 4th Cavalry Battalion (Chanthaburi) (กองพันทหารม้าที่ 4)
  - Engineering Group (กองทหารช่าง)
  - Signal Group (กองทหารสื่อสาร)
  - Chantaburi Field Police Group (กองตำรวจสนามจันทบุรี)
  - Trat Field Police Group (กองตำรวจสนามตราด)
- Lopburi Division (กองพลลพบุรี) – Lieutenant Colonel Luang Ranpativech (พันโท หลวงราญปฏิเวช) Attacking Battambang through Sisophon.
  - 4th Infantry Battalion (Lopburi) (กองพันทหารราบที่ 4) - Unknown Commander
  - 6th Infantry Battalion (Lopburi) "Musketeer / Tiger Soldier Battalion" (กองพันทหารราบที่ 6 "กองพันทหารเสือ") engaged with French colonial troops at Aranyaprathet, Muang Paniat and Poipet.
  - 8th Infantry Battalion "Death Battalion" (กองพันทหารราบที่ 8 "กองพันมรณะ") engaged with French colonial troops at Aranyaprathet, Muang Paniat and Poipet.
  - 37th Infantry Battalion (Ratchaburi) (กองพันทหารราบที่ 37) - Unknown Commander
  - 1st Infantry Battalion "Royal Guards" (Reserves) (กองหนุน กองพันทหารราบที่ 1 มหาดเล็กรักษาพระองค์) - Unknown Commander
  - 29th Infantry Battalion (Phitsanulok) (Reserves) (กองหนุน กองพันทหารราบที่ 29) - Unknown Commander
  - 4th Artillery Battalion (กองพันปืนใหญ่ที่ 4) - Unknown Commander

Aran Combined Division (กองพลผสมอรัญ)

- Phra Nakhon (Capital) Division (กองพลพระนคร) – Lieutenant Colonel Luang Kraichingrith (พันโท หลวงไกรชิงฤทธิ์) - Attacking Siam Reap through Sisophon.
  - 1st Infantry Battalion "Royal Guards" (กองพันทหารราบที่ 1 มหาดเล็กรักษาพระองค์) - Unknown Commander
  - 2nd Infantry Battalion (กองพันทหารราบที่ 2) - Unknown Commander
  - 3rd Infantry Battalion Phra Nakorn "Capital Battalion" (กองพันทหารราบที่ 3 พระนคร) - Deputy Commander (1940) Lieutenant Nim Prathumsiri / Khun Nimmanakalyut (ร้อยโท นิ่ม ประทุมศิริ / ขุนนิมมานกลยุทธ) Fought in the Battle of Phum Preav (สมรภูมิบ้านพร้าว) and managed to capture the Regimental flag of French III/5e Régiment Etranger d'Infanterie led by Major Belloc. In May 1941 Lieutenant Nim Prathumsiri will be promoted to be the Commander for the 3rd Infantry Battalion.
- Surin Division (กองพลสุรินทร์) – Lieutenant Colonel Luang Veerayutyothin (พันโท หลวงวีรยุทธโยธิน) (Transferred from Isan Army)

Notes: However, other than units mentioned in Pratyakorn's research papers there are also other units that participated in Burapha Army formation. such as Burapha Reserve Group (กองหนุนบูรพา)

Isan Army (กองทัพอิสาณ, Northeastern Army) – Colonel Luang Kriangsakphichit (พันเอก หลวงเกรียงศักดิ์พิชิต) Attacking from Surin to capture Champasak before meeting with Phayap Division at Vientiane then divert to assist Burapha Army taking Phnom Penh.

- Udon Division (กองพลอุดร) – Lieutenant Colonel Luang Nithetyutthasilp (พันโท หลวงนิเทศยุทธศิลป)
  - 2nd Infantry Battalion (Bangkok) (กองพันทหารราบที่ 2) - Unknown Commander
  - 22nd Infantry Battalion (Udon Thani) (กองพันทหารราบที่ 22) - Unknown Commander
  - One Artillery Battalion - Unknown Commander
  - One engineering unit - Unknown Commander
  - One signal unit - Unknown Commander
- Ubon Division (กองพลอุบล) – Lieutenant Colonel Luang Chamrasromran (พันโท หลวงจำรัสโรมรัน)
  - 19th Infantry Battalion (Surin) (กองพันทหารราบที่ 19) - Unknown Commander
  - 20th Infantry Battalion (Ubon Ratchathani) (กองพันทหารราบที่ 20) - Unknown Commander
  - 21st Infantry Battalion (Nakhon Ratchasima) (กองพันทหารราบที่ 21) - Unknown Commander
  - 30th Infantry Battalion (Lampang) (กองพันทหารราบที่ 30) - Unknown Commander
  - 8th Artillery Battalion (Ubon) (กองพันปืนใหญ่ที่ 8) - Unknown Commander
  - 5th Cavalry (Roi Et) (กองพันทหารม้าที่ 5) - Unknown Commander
  - One armor/tank platoon - Unknown Commander
  - One engineering unit - Unknown Commander
  - One signal unit - Unknown Commander
  - Reserves - Unknown Commander
  - Quartermaster unit - Unknown Commander
- Surin Division (กองพลสุรินทร์) – Lieutenant Colonel Luang Veerayutyothin (พันโท หลวงวีรยุทธโยธิน) Attacking through Chong Chom into Samraong. (Operated together with Aran Combined Division, Burapha Army)
  - 7th Infantry Battalion (กองพันทหารราบที่ 7) - Unknown Commander
  - 29th Infantry Battalion (Phitsanulok) (กองพันทหารราบที่ 29) - Unknown Commander
  - 19th Infantry Battalion (Reserves) (Nakhon Ratchasima) (กองหนุน กองพันทหารราบที่ 19) - Unknown Commander
  - 3rd Cavalry Battalion (Nakhon Ratchasima) (กองพันทหารม้าที่ 3) - Unknown Commander
  - 10th Artillery Battalion (Ubon Ratchathani) (กองพันปืนใหญ่ที่ 10) - Unknown Commander
  - One engineering unit - Unknown Commander
  - One signal unit - Unknown Commander
  - Reserves
- 1st Indochina Independence Battalion (กองพันทหารอินโดจีนอิสสระภาพที่ 1) - Defected Indochinese colonial troops who joined Thai forces during Battle of Samraong.

4th Military District (มณฑลทหารบกที่ 4) (Nakorn Sawan) – Colonel Luang Senanarong (พันเอก หลวงเสนาณรงค์)

- Phayap (Northern) Division (กองพลพายัพ) – Colonel Luang Hansongkhram (พันเอก หลวงหาญสงคราม) Attacking Luang Prabang and link up with Isan Army at Vientiane.
  - 30th Infantry Battalion (Lampang) (กองพันทหารราบที่ 30) - Unknown Commander
  - 31st Infantry Battalion (Chiang Mai) (กองพันทหารราบที่ 31) - Unknown Commander
  - 28th Infantry Battalion (Reserves) (Nakhon Sawan) (กองหนุน กองพันทหารราบที่ 28) - Unknown Commander
  - 30th Infantry Battalion (Reserves) (Lam Pang) (กองหนุน กองพันทหารราบที่ 30) - Unknown Commander
  - One signal unit

Southern Combined Division (กองพลผสมปักษ์ใต้) – Colonel Luang Senanarong (พันเอก หลวงเสนาณรงค์)

- Songkhla Division (กองพลสงขลา) – Lieutenant Colonel Luang Khanobchamnanyuth (พันโท หลวงขนบชำนาญยุทธ)
  - 5th Infantry Battalion (Hat Yai, Songkhla) (กองพันทหารราบที่ 5) - Unknown Commander
  - 41st Infantry Battalion (Suan Tun, Songkhla) (กองพันทหารราบที่ 41) - Unknown Commander
  - 42nd Infantry Battalion (Khok Pho, Pattani) (กองพันทหารราบที่ 42) - Unknown Commander
  - 17th Artillery Battalion (Suan Tun - Songkla) (กองพันปืนใหญ่ที่ 17) - Unknown Commander
- Nakhon Si Thammarat Division (กองพลนครศรีธรรมราช) – Lieutenant Colonel Luang Surarithisomboon (พันโท หลวงสุรสิทธิสมบูรณ์)
  - 38th Infantry Battalion (Chumphon) (กองพันทหารราบที่ 38) - Unknown Commander
  - 39th Infantry Battalion (Nakhon Srithammarat) (กองพันทหารราบที่ 39) - Unknown Commander
  - 40th Infantry Battalion (Trang) (กองพันทหารราบที่ 40) - Unknown Commander
  - 3rd Artillery Battalion (Nakhon Srithammarat) (กองพันปืนใหญ่ที่ 3) - Unknown Commander

Ceasefire Divisions

- Thonburi Division (กองพลธนบุรี) New division created after the ceasefire between French and Thai forces with Japanese mediation.
  - 28th Infantry Battalion (Nakorn Sawan) (กองพันทหารราบที่ 28) - Unknown Commander
  - 2nd Infantry Battalion (Bangkok) (กองพันทหารราบที่ 2) - Unknown Commander
  - 3rd Infantry Battalion (Bangkok) (กองพันทหารราบที่ 3) - Unknown Commander
  - 6th Artillery Division (Phitsanulok) - Unknown Commander
  - One signal unit - Unknown Commander
  - Reserves - Unknown Commander
- Nakhon Ratchasima Division (กองพลนครราชสีมา) New division created after the ceasefire between French and Thai forces with Japanese mediation.
  - 21st Infantry Battalion (Nakhon Ratchasima) (กองพันทหารราบที่ 21) - Unknown Commander
  - 21st Infantry Battalion (Reserves) (Nakhon Ratchasima) (กองหนุน กองพันทหารราบที่ 21) - Unknown Commander
  - 19th Infantry Battalion (Surin) (กองพันทหารราบที่ 19) - Unknown Commander
  - 19th Infantry Battalion (Reserves) (Surin) (กองหนุน กองพันทหารราบที่ 19) - Unknown Commander
  - Special support unit - Unknown Commander
  - Reserves
  - Anti-Aircraft unit

Notes: Typical Thai Infantry Battalion during Franco-Thai War consisted of one battalion HQ, three LMG companies, one heavy MG company, one infantry gun platoon, one supply platoon, one medical platoon and one communications platoon.

Royal Thai Air Force

- Air Force Field Commander (แม่ทัพอากาศ) Air Chief Marshal Luang Athuk-Thewadejas (พลอากาศเอก หลวงอธึกเทวเดช)
  - Field Air Force (กองทัพอากาศสนาม)

RTAF Order of Battle, December 31 1940

Kong Bin Yai Phak Nua (Northern Combined Air Group - กองบินใหญ่ภาคเหนือ)

- Kong Bin Noi Phasom 73 (73rd Combined Wing - กองบินน้อยผสมที่ 73) (Ubon Ratchathani)
  - Foong Bin Truat Kan 32 (32nd Reconnaissance Squadron - ฝูงบินตรวจการณ์ที่ 32) - Vought V-93S Corsair
  - Foong Bin Thing Raberd 50 (50th Bomber Squadron - ฝูงบินทิ้งระเบิดที่ 50) - Martin 139WS
- Kong Bin Noi Phasom 35 (35th Combined Wing - กองบินน้อยผสมที่ 35)
  - Foong Bin Truat Kan 34 (34th Reconnaissance Squadron - ฝูงบินตรวจการณ์ที่ 34) (Udon Thani) – Vought V-93S "Corsair"
  - Foong Bin Khap Lai 70 (70th Fighter Squadron - ฝูงบินขับไล่ที่ 70) (Nakhon Phanom) – Curtiss Hawk III

Kong Bin Yai Phak Tai (Southern Combined Air Group - กองบินใหญ่ภาคใต้) - Group Captain Khun Ronnaphagrad (นาวาอากาศเอก ขุนรณนภากาศ)

- Kong Bin Noi Phasom 66 (66th Combined Wing - กองบินน้อยผสมที่ 66) (Don Muang)
  - Foong Bin Phibun Songkhram 1 (ฝูงบินพิบูลสงคราม 1) – Mitsubishi Ki-30
  - Foong Bin Phibun Songkhram 2 (ฝูงบินพิบูลสงคราม 2) – Mitsubishi Ki-30
  - Foong Bin Khap Lai 60 (60th Fighter Squadron - ฝูงบินขับไล่ที่ 60) – Curtiss Hawk 75N
- Kong Bin Noi Phasom 74 (74th Combined Wing - กองบินน้อยผสมที่ 74) (Chanthaburi)
  - Foong Bin Khap Lai 71 (71st Fighter Squadron - ฝูงบินขับไล่ที่ 71) – Curtiss Hawk III
  - Foong Bin Khap Lai 72 (72nd Fighter Squadron - ฝูงบินขับไล่ที่ 72) – Curtiss Hawk III
  - Foong Bin Truat Kan 44 (44th Reconnaissance Squadron - ฝูงบินตรวจการณ์ที่ 44) (Chanthaburi) – Vought V-93S "Corsair"
- Kong Bin Noi Phasom 75 (75th Combined Wing - กองบินน้อยผสมที่ 75) (Prachinburi)
  - Foong Bin Khap Lai 73 (73rd Fighter Squadron - ฝูงบินขับไล่ที่ 73) (Sisaket) – Curtiss Hawk III
  - Foong Bin Khap Lai 80 (80th Fighter Squadron - ฝูงบินขับไล่ที่ 80) – Curtiss Hawk III
  - Foong Bin Jom Ti 35 (35th Attack Squadron - ฝูงบินโจมตีที่ 35) – Vought V-93SA "Corsair"
- Kong Bin Noi Phasom 40 (40th Combined Wing - กองบินน้อยผสมที่ 40) (Korat)
  - Foong Bin Truat Kan 42 (42nd Reconnaissance Squadron - ฝูงบินตรวจการณ์ที่ 42) (Surin) – Vought V-93S "Corsair"
  - Foong Bin Jom Ti 41 (41st Attack Squadron - ฝูงบินโจมตีที่ 41) (Ubon Ratchathani) – Vought V-93SA "Corsair"
  - Foong Bin Jom Ti 43 (43rd Attack Squadron - ฝูงบินโจมตีที่ 43) – Vought V-93SA "Corsair"

Royal Thai Navy

- Naval Field Commander (แม่ทัพเรือ) Rear Admiral Luang Sinthusongkhramchai (พลเรือตรี หลวงสินธุสงครามชัย)

Royal Thai Navy Headquarters

- Military Support Ship HTMS Angthong (Ex-Royal Yacht)

1st Fleet (กองเรือที่ 1) - Captain Luang Sangwon Yutthakit (นาวาเอก หลวงสังวรยุทธกิจ)

- 1st Squadron (หมวดเรือที่ 1)
  - Heavy Gunboat HTMS Sri Ayudhya
  - Torpedo-Boat Destroyer HTMS Phuket
  - Torpedo-Boat Destroyer HTMS Pattani
  - Torpedo-Boat Destroyer HTMS Surasdra/Surat
  - Submarine HTMS Matchanu
  - Submarine HTMS Sinsamut
- 3rd Squadron (หมวดเรือที่ 3)
  - Heavy Gunboat HTMS Thonburi (Engaged at Ko Chang, Heavily Damaged) - Commander Luang Phrom Wiraphan (นาวาโท หลวงพร้อมวีระพันธ์)
  - Torpedo-Boat Destroyer HTMS Songkhla (Engaged at Ko Chang, Sunk) - Lieutenant Commander Chant Singhachan (นาวาตรี ชั้น สิงหชาญ)
  - Torpedo-Boat Destroyer HTMS Rayong - (Engaged at Ko Chang) Lieutenant Commander Bai Tessanasadub (นาวาตรี ใบ เทศนะสดับ)
  - Torpedo-Boat Destroyer HTMS Chantaburi
  - Minelayer HTMS Bang Rachan

2nd Fleet (กองเรือที่ 2) - Captain Chalit Kulkumthon (นาวาเอก ชลิต กุลกำม์ธร)

- 2nd Squadron (หมวดเรือที่ 2)
  - Sloop HTMS Tachin
  - Torpedo-Boat Destroyer HTMS Trad
  - Torpedo-Boat Destroyer HTMS Chonburi (Engaged at Ko Chang, Sunk) - Lieutenant Pratin Chaipanya (เรือเอก ประทิน ไชยปัญญา)
  - Torpedo-Boat Destroyer HTMS Chumphon
  - Submarine HTMS Wirun
  - Submarine HTMS Phlai Chumpon
- 4th Squadron (หมวดเรือที่ 4)
  - Sloop HTMS Maeklong
  - Torpedo Patrol Boat HTMS Khlong Yai
  - Torpedo Patrol Boat HTMS Tak Bai
  - Torpedo Patrol Boat HTMS Kantang
  - Minelayer HTMS Nhong Sarhai (Engaged at Ko Chang) - Lieutenant Daorueang Petchart (เรือเอก ดาวเรือง เพชรชาติ)

3rd Fleet (กองเรือที่ 3) - Commander Luang Phrompisuth (นาวาโท หลวงพรหมพิสุทธิ์)

- Light Gunboat HTMS Sukhothai
- R-Class Destroyer HTMS Phra Ruang
- Hunt-Class Minesweeper HTMS Chaophraya
- Fishery Protection Ship HTMS Sarasin
- Fishery Protection Ship HTMS Thiew Uthok (Engaged at Ko Chang)
- Fishery Protection Ship HTMS Trawenwari
- Troopship HTMS Sichang
- Troopship HTMS Phangan
- Transport Ship HTMS Chang (Supported Battle of Ko Chang by towing HTMS Thonburi for her beaching attempt.)
- Motor Torpedo Boats No.6-11
- Support Ship / Tugboat HTMS Chuang
- Support Ship HTMS Boriphanpahol
- Support Ship HTMS Samet (Confiscated Imperial German ship from WWI)
- Support Ship HTMS Khram (Confiscated Imperial German ship from WWI)

Elsewhere

- Light Gunboat HTMS Rattanakosin currently under maintenance in drydock.

== French Order of Battle ==
La Présence Militaire Française en Indochine 1940-1945, Claude HESSE D'ALZON, Vincennes : SHAT, 1985. ISBN 2-86323-022-0. via France 1940 Website (Ground Force) L'aviation de Vichy au Combat, Les Campagnes Oubliées, vol.1, Christian-Jacques EHRENGARDT and Christopher SHORES, Paris : Lavauzelle, 1983. via France 1940 Website (Air Force)

Cambodia Zone

- Division de Cochinchine-Cambodge - General Jean Robert de Rendiger

Mekong-Pakse Sector - Colonel André

- Pakse District :
  - I/RTA Régiment de Tirailleurs Annamites (Annamese Tirailleurs Regiment) - Major Pelier
  - Cochinchina Engineer Platoon
  - Garde Indigène Brigade
- Stung Treng District :
  - II/RTA Régiment de Tirailleurs Annamites (Annamese Tirailleurs Regiment)
  - 2nd Battery/5e RAC Régiment d'Artillerie Coloniale (Colonial Artillery Regiment)
  - Tonkin Motorcycle Platoon
  - Garde Indigène Brigade

Cambodia Defensive Sector - Lieutenant-General Yves de Boisboissel (Yves de Boisboissel)

Dangrek Sector - Colonel Benoit-Guyod :

- Kampong Thom District
  - I/RTA bis (Régiment de Tirailleurs Annamites bis) (2nd Annamese Tirailleurs Regiment)- Major Runner
  - Garde Indigène Brigade
- Kralanh District
  - II/RTA bis (Régiment de Tirailleurs Annamites bis) (2nd Annamese Tirailleurs Regiment) - Major Rousson
  - One battery from 5e RAC (5e Régiment d'Artillerie Coloniale) (5th Colonial Artillery Regiment) - Unknown Commander
  - Garde Indigène Brigade

Groupement J - Colonel Henri-Paul Jacomy

- III/5e REI (5e Régiment Etranger d'Infanterie) (5th Foreign Infantry Regiment) - Major Belloc
- II/11e RIC (11e Régiment d'Infanterie Coloniale) (11th Colonial Infantry Regiment) - Major Faulot
- II/16e RMIC (16e Régiment Mixte d'Infanterie Coloniale) (16th Mixed Colonial Infantry Regiment) - Major Rémery
- IV/19e RMIC (19e Régiment Mixte d'Infanterie Coloniale) (19th Mixed Colonial Infantry Regiment) - Major Quelennec
- DMC Détachement Motorisé de Cochinchine (Cochinchina Motorized Detachment) - Captain Aguesse
- I/5e RAC (Régiment d'Artillerie Coloniale) (Colonial Artillery Regiment) - Major Belletrude (Two motorized Mle 1897 75mm Field Guns)
- II/5e RAC (Régiment d'Artillerie Coloniale) (Colonial Artillery Regiment) - Major Michel (Two 105mm Mle 1928 mountain gun, two 75mm Mle 1928 mountain gun)
- Engineer Company (2 Platoons) - Commander Cambon
- Regimental AA platoon from 11e RIC (11e Régiment d'Infanterie Coloniale) (11th Colonial Infantry Regiment) - Lieutenant de Pins (Unknown 20mm Guns mounted on truck. Possibly an Oerlikon type)

Groupement N - Colonel Natte

- II/4e RTT (4e Régiment de Tirailleurs Tonkinois) (4th Tonkinese Tirailleurs Regiment) - Major Fourmachat
- II/9e RIC (9e Régiment d'Infanterie Coloniale) (9th Colonial Infantry Regiment) - Major Dumaine
- II/11e RIC (11e Régiment d'Infanterie Coloniale) (11th Colonial Infantry Regiment) - Major Chapeau
- Garde Indigène Brigade

Groupement F - Colonel Jean Ferrand

- I/RTC (Régiment de Tirailleurs Cambodgiens) (Cambodian Tirailleurs Regiment) - Major Palud
- II/RTC (Régiment de Tirailleurs Cambodgiens) (Cambodian Tirailleurs Regiment) - Major Langellier or Major Lajoix
- V/3e RTT (3e Régiment de Tirailleurs Tonkinois) (3rd Tonkinese Tirailleurs Regiment) - Major Vicaire or Major du Commun
- I/5e REI (5e Régiment Etranger d'Infanterie) (5th Foreign Infantry Regiment) - Major Djering
- 1st Battery 5e RAC (5e Régiment d'Artillerie Coloniale) (5th Colonial Artillery Regiment) - Unknown Commander
- IV/4e RAC (4e Régiment d'Artillerie Coloniale) (4th Colonial Artillery Regiment) - Major Poiret (One 105mm Mle 1928 mountain gun battery, two 75mm Mle 1928 mountain gun batteries.)
- Garde Indigène Brigade

Central Laos Zone - Brigadier General François-Robert Bourdeau (Retired since August 1940 but remained employed.)

- Northern Sector - Major Baudet
  - IV/10e RMIC (10e Régiment Mixte d'Infanterie Coloniale) (10th Mixed Colonial Infantry Regiment) - Major Baudet
  - 5th Battery/4e RAC (4e Régiment d'Artillerie Coloniale) (4th Colonial Artillery Regiment) - Unknown Commander (One 75mm Mle 1928 mountain gun battery.)
  - 5th Mountain Company and Groupe Moï (sector reserves)
  - One dug-in infantry platoon
  - One 155mm gun
- Southern Sector
  - I/10e RMIC (10e Régiment Mixte d'Infanterie Coloniale) (10th Mixed Colonial Infantry Regiment) - Unknown Commander
  - One 155mm gun
  - Garde Indigène Brigade
- Manoeuvre Element - Brigadier General François-Robert Bourdeau
  - III/10e RMIC (10e Régiment Mixte d'Infanterie Coloniale) (10th Mixed Colonial Infantry Regiment) - Major Dasque (?)
  - Bataillon de Tirailleurs Montagnards du Sud-Annam (BTMSA - South-Annam Montagnard Tirailleurs Battalion) - Major Arrighi
  - Détachement Motorisé d'Annam DMA (Annam Motorised Detachment) - Unknown Commander
  - VII/4e RAC (4e Régiment d'Artillerie Coloniale) (4th Colonial Artillery Regiment) - Major Leroux
  - Self-propelled 75mm AA battery - Unknown Commander (Four (?) Autocanons de 75 AC Mle 1913)
  - Regimental AA platoon - Unknown Commander (Three (?) 20mm Oerlikon CA Mle 39 guns)
  - Regimental AA platoon - Unknown Commander (Three (?) 20mm Oerlikon CA Mle 39 guns)

Northern Laos Zone - Captain de La Fournière

- Infantry company (flown in from Tonkin)
- One Foreign Legion platoon, one machinegun platoon (flown in from Tonkin)
- Infantry company (flown in from Tonkin)
- Garde Indigène Brigade

France 1940 Website: Stated that Garde Indigène units have varying strengths from 230 to 300 men and only about 10% were mobile platoons/sections.

Aéronautique Militaire Française de l'Indochine

10th May 1940

Groupe Aérien Autonome 41 (41st Autonomous Aerial Group)- Commandant Thibaudau (?)

- E.R. 1/41 (Pursat) (9 Potez 25) - Lieutenant Adam
- E.R. 2/41 (Tonkin) (4 Farman 221) - Capitaine Penchinat

Groupe Aérien Autonome 42 (42nd Autonomous Aerial Group) - Commandant Miellet

- E.R. 1/42 (Pursat) (10 Potez 25) - Capitaine Minard
- E.B. 2/42 (Tan Son Nhut) (6 Potez 542) - Capitaine Jacquelin

Groupe Aérien Mixte 595 (595th Mixed Aerial Group) - Unknown Commander

- E.O. 1/595 (Dong-Hoï) (7 Potez 25) - Commandant Mayaud

Groupe Aérien Mixte 596 (596th Mixed Aerial Group) - Unknown Commander

- Esc. 1/C.B.S. (8 Loire 130, 4 CAMS 37 & CAMS 55) - Capitaine Michel

September 1940

Groupe Aérien Autonome 41 (41st Autonomous Aerial Group) - Commandant Thibaudau

- E.R. 1/41 (Pursat) (Potez 25) - Lieutenant Adam
- E.B. 2/41 (Tonkin) (4 Farman 221) - Capitaine Penchinat

Groupe Aérien Autonome 42 (42nd Autonomous Aerial Group) Commandant Miellet

- GAM HQ (Potez 631C) - Unknown Base and Commander (3 Potez 631 "C" bound for China is interned at Haiphong and pressed into Indochinese service.)
- E.R. 1/42 (Pursat) (10 Potez 25) - Capitaine Minard
- E.B. 2/42 (Tan Son Nhut) (6 Potez 542) - Capitaine Jacquelin

Groupe Aérien Mixte 595 (595th Mixed Aerial Group) - Commandant Pelisse

- E.O. 1/595 (Dong-Hoï) (7 Potez 25) - Commandant Mayaud
- E.C. 2/595 (Bach Mai) (9 Morane-Saulnier 406) - Capitaine Gangloff

Groupe Aérien Mixte 596 (596th Mixed Aerial Group) - Capitaine Bodin

- E.O. 1/596 (Tourane/Da Nang) (6 Potez 25) - Capitaine Bodin
- E.C. 2/596 (7 Morane-Saulnier 406) - Capitaine Horvatte (Established in October 1940 from Chinese-contract MS.406 without 20mm Cannons.)

Commandement des Bases du Sud (Southern Base Command)

- Esc. 1/C.B.S. (Cat-Laï) (8 Loire 130, 2 CAMS 37, 2 CAMS 55) - Capitaine Michel

French Navy

See Also: Division navale d'Extrême-Orient

Division Navale d'Extrême-Orient (DNEO) - Admiral Jean Decoux

- 5e division de croiseurs (5th Cruiser Division) (Transferred from Shanghai to Saigon)
  - Lamotte-Picquet - Capitaine de Vaisseau Régis Bérenger
- Avisos
  - Bougainville-Class Colonial Aviso (Sloop) Amiral Charner (Lt. Comm. Le Calvez) and Dumont d'Urville (Comm. de Quievrecourt).
  - Bougainville-Class Colonial Aviso (Sloop) Rigault de Genouilly (Shanghai)
  - Arras-Class Tahure (Lt. Comm. Mercadier) and Marne (Marne-Class Aviso) (Lt. Comm. Marc) at Saigon
- Yangtze Gunboat Flotilla (Yangtze)
  - Gunboats Balny, Doudart de Lagrée, Francis Garnier
- Si-Kiang Canton (Guangzhou) Gunboat Station
  - Gunboat Argus
- Haiphong Gunboat Station
  - Gunboats Mytho, Tourane, Vigilante
- Saigon Gunboat Station
  - Gunboats Avalanche, Commandant Bourdais
- Aéronautique Navale
  - Section d'Hydravions de la Marine
  - Esc. HS6 (Cat-Laï) (2 Loire 130, 3 Gourdou-Leseurre 832, 3 Potez 452) - Lieutenant de Vaisseau LV Gaxotte

Notes: Heavy Cruiser Suffren were assigned to Indochina in 1939 but departed for Indian Ocean convoy escort operations during the early phase of the Second World War and eventually joins Force X after visiting Alexandria. The cruiser then interned after the Armistice of 22 June 1940 and rejoin the war with Free French Service. Submarines L'Espoir returned to Toulon in December 1940 while Phénix were sunk in June 1939 on training maneuvers around South China Sea.

== See also ==
- Thailand in World War II
- List of Thai military equipment of World War II
- Battle of Banphlao
- Battle of Ko Chang
- Japanese invasion of French Indochina
- Japanese occupation of Cambodia
- Japanese coup d'état in French Indochina

== Bibliography ==
- Young, Edward M. (1984). "France's Forgotten Air War". Air Enthusiast. No. 25. pp. 22–33. ISSN 0143-5450.
