= Treaty between Thailand and Japan (1940) =

1940 treaty between Thailand and Japan

The Treaty between Thailand and Japan Concerning the Continuance of Friendly Relations and the Mutual Respect of Each Other's Territorial Integrity was concluded in Tokyo on June 12, 1940 between the Thai and the Japanese governments. The treaty was a step in co-operation between the Thai and the Japanese governments, which eventually became allies in the Second World War.

Ratifications were exchanged in Bangkok on December 23, 1940. The treaty became effective on the same day and was registered in League of Nations Treaty Series on July 26, 1941.

== Background ==
Following the Japanese invasion of China in 1937, the Japanese government began cultivating relations with the Thai government. That was intensified during the battle of France (May–June 1940), as the German forces advanced into France. The Japanese government was keen to exploit the situation to gain control over French Indochina.

The Kingdom of Thailand had a common border with Indochina and so was viewed by Tokyo as a possible ally against the French control of that area.

== Terms ==
Article 1 provided for mutual respect of each other's sovereignty by the two governments.

Article 2 provided for the joint consultation between the two governments on matters of common concern.

Article 3 stipulated that if a party was under attack by a third party, the other party would not lend any assistance to the attacking third party.

Article 4 provided for the ratification of the treaty.

Article 5 stipulated the treaty would remain in force for five years, with the possibility to extend it further.

== Aftermath ==
The growing co-operation between the Thai and the Japanese governments in the wake of the treaty led the Thais to wage a brief and successful war against French Indochina in 1940-1941, which resulted in some territorial conquests for Thailand with Japanese assistance. In general, the trend facilitated the gradual process of Japanese takeover of Indochina throughout 1941, which was one of the main causes for Japanese entry into the Second World War. The Thai government, in return, was compelled to join the Japanese government in a treaty of alliance in December 1941.

== See also ==
- British-Thai Non-Aggression Pact
