= Rattanakosindra-class gunboat =

Early 20th century gunboat class built for the Royal Thai Navy

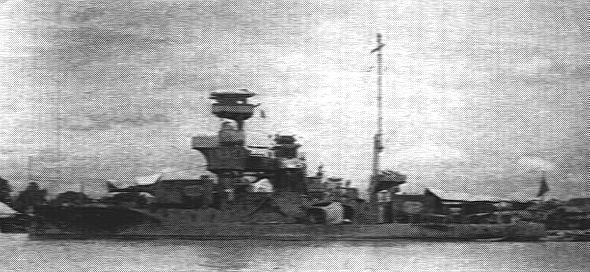
- HTMS Sukhothai

Class overview
- Name: Ratanakosindra class
- Builders: Armstrong Whitworth, High Walker, Newcastle upon Tyne; Vickers Armstrong, Barrow-in-Furness
- Operators: Royal Thai Navy
- Built: 1924–1930
- In service: 1929–1971
- Completed: 2

General characteristics (as built)
- Type: Gunboat
- Displacement: 866 t (852 long tons) (standard); 1,000 t (980 long tons) (full load)
- Length: 53.04 m (174 ft 0 in)
- Beam: 11.3 m (37 ft 1 in)
- Draft: 3.28 m (10 ft 9 in)
- Installed power: 2 Yarrow boilers; 850 PS (630 kW; 840 shp)
- Propulsion: 2 shafts; Vertical Triple Expansion engines
- Speed: 12 knots (22 km/h; 14 mph)
- Range: 2,000 nmi (3,700 km; 2,300 mi) at 10 knots (19 km/h; 12 mph)
- Crew: 103
- Armament: 2 × single 152 mm (6.0 in) (Armstrong Pattern TT 6 inch/50 naval gun); 4 × single 76 mm (3.0 in) Armstrong Pattern N 3 inch/40 naval gun) AA guns
- Armour: Belt: 1.25–2.5 in (32–64 mm); Decks: .75–1.5 in (19–38 mm); Barbettes: 2.5 in (64 mm); Gun turrets: 2.5 in (64 mm); Conning tower: 4.75 in (121 mm)

The Rattanakosindra class (Thai: เรือปืนชั้นรัตนโกสินทร์) were a pair of ocean-going armoured gunboats built in the United Kingdom and operated by the Royal Thai Navy.

== Design and development ==
The original order for the Rattanakosindra class 1,075 t (1,058 long tons) armoured gunboats was placed in 1914 by the Kingdom of Siam. The original design for two ships, armed with four 152 mm (6.0 in) guns, four 76 mm (3.0 in) guns. The ships would powered by Vertical Triple Expansion engines and coal fired boilers. Armstrong Whitworth in High Walker, Newcastle upon Tyne was awarded the contract and the first ship was laid down 1914 in Yard 872 while Hawthorn Leslie was subcontracted to build the engines and boilers. The order was cancelled as a result of the First World War, the incomplete hull of HTMS Rattanakosindra was dismantled to free the slipway for British use and the second ship, HTMS Sukhothai was never laid down. Rattankosindra was reordered again in the 1920s from Armstrong Whitworth, losing a pair of guns in the process.

== Ships ==
Name	Namesake	Builder	Laid down	Launched	Commissioned	Fate
HTMS Rattanakosindra	Rattanakosin, a classic name for Bangkok	Armstrong Whitworth, Elswick, Newcastle upon Tyne	29 September 1924	21 April 1925	August 1925	Stricken October 1967
HTMS Sukhothai	City of Sukhothai	Vickers Armstrong, Barrow-in-Furness	December 1928	19 November 1929	December 1930	Stricken 1971

The new ships would retain the names of the cancelled pair of gunboats, HTMS Rattanakosindra (ร.ล.รัตนโกสินทร์) and HTMS Sukhothai (ร.ล.สุโขทัย), and be known as the Rattanakosindra class, but built to modified specifications with improved seaworthiness and reduced armament. The vessels, although classified as gunboats were built with a low-freeboard monitor-style layout compared to a traditional gunboat designs which generally lacked many of the features in the Rattanakosindra class's design. These were fully enclosed armoured turrets at the fore and aft, a conning tower and a fire-control system (a 9 ft, 2.7 m rangefinder on the foremast). The vessel was short and broad beamed which contributed to a 'cramped' appearance. A tall monitor-style superstructure was given for improved visibility while firing. An unusual features of the Rattanakosindra class for a monitor-style warship was a raised-forecastle for improved seaworthiness. Four 152 mm (6.0 in) guns in the original design was reduced to two single guns which were housed in fully enclosed turrets. The original anti-aircraft armament of four single high angle 76 mm (3.0 in) guns was retained. Instead of the original cylindrical coal-fired Scotch marine boiler, oil-fired Yarrow boilers were used to power the ships twin vertical triple expansion engines. These changes reduced the displacement of the design to 1,000 t (980 long tons). The ships were to be heavily armoured for their size, with an armoured belt of 1.25–2.5 in (32–64 mm), .75–1.5 in (19–38 mm) of armour protected the decks and 4.75 in (121 mm) protecting the conning tower.

Initially only Rattanakosindra was ordered in 1924. She was laid down first on 29 September of the same year by Armstrong in Elswick and completed August 1925. Sukhothai was ordered separately to the same specifications as the Rattanakosindra in 1928 and was laid down at Barrow-in-Furness in December 1918. This was ordered from the new Vickers-Armstrongs company, which was created by the merger of Armstrong Whitworth and rival Vickers Limited in the previous year. At the time of her launch, Sukhothai was romanised in English as Sukhodaya.

External videos
- British Gun Boat Built For Siam 1929 on British Pathé

== Service ==
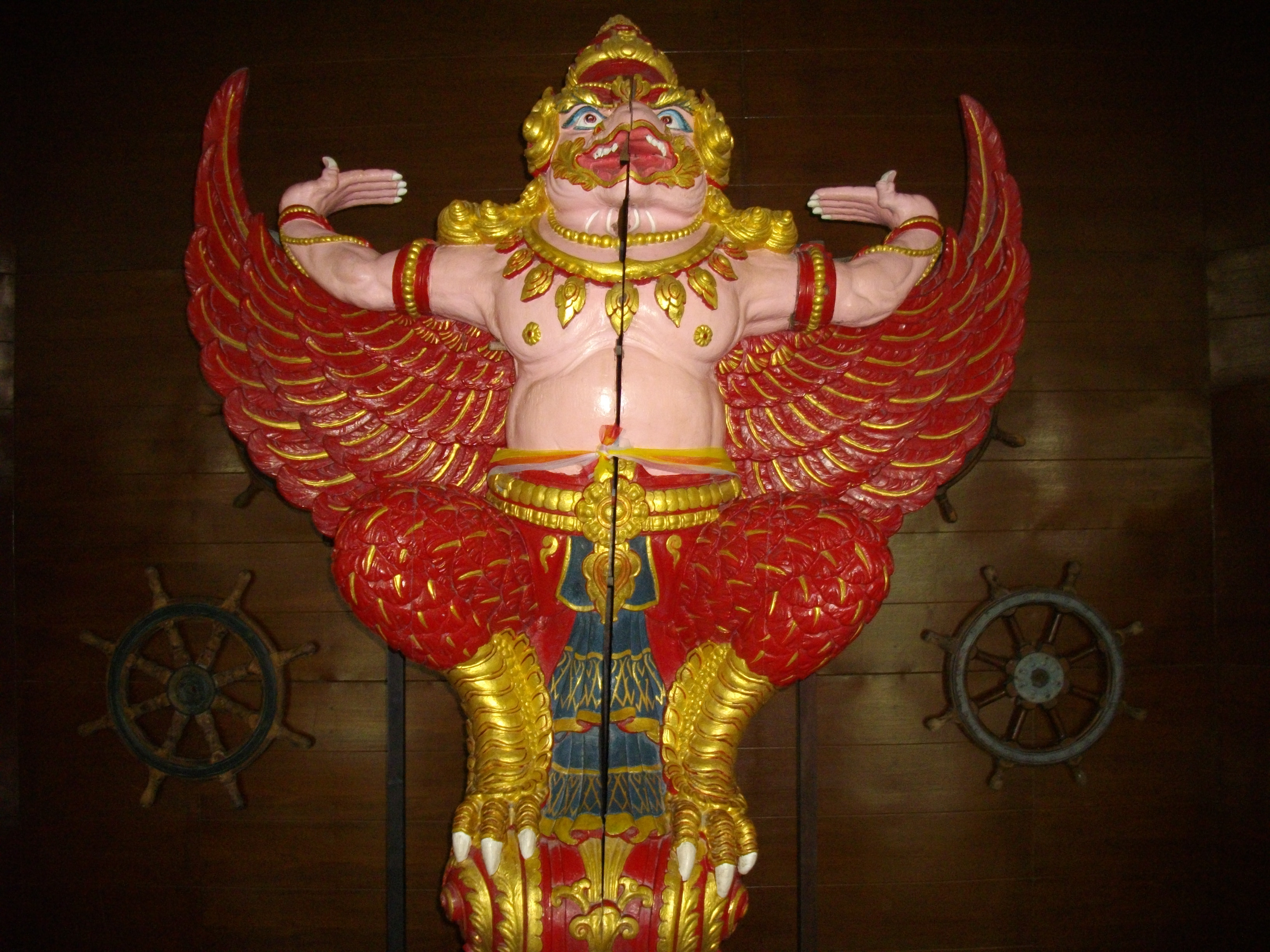
Garuda figurehead from HTMS Rattanakosindra

The two gunboats were in active service during the Franco-Thai War and World War II and received additional anti-aircraft armament in the form of two single 40 mm (1.6 in) QF 2-pounder naval guns in the 1930s and two single 20 mm (0.8 in) Breda 20/65 mod.39 in the 1940s each, but neither Rattanakosindra nor Sukhothai saw combat. Sukkhotai was briefly involved in the Manhattan Rebellion of 1951 where she threatened to open fire on Klai Kangwon Palace. Both ships were stricken after decades of service, Rattanakosindra was retired in 1967 and Sukhothai was retired in 1971. The bow garuda of both ships are on display at the Royal Thai Navy Museum.

== See also ==
- Ratanakosin-class corvette, identically named class from the 1980s
