= Phichit Kriangsakphichit =

Luang Phichit Kriangsakphichit
- พิชิต เกรียงศักดิ์พิชิต
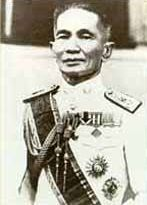

Minister of Public Health
- In office 2 February 1946 – 24 March 1946
- Prime Minister: Khuang Aphaiwong
- Preceded by: Adul Aduldejaraj
- Succeeded by: Phraya Soontornpipit

Minister of Defence
- In office 15 November 1943 – 1 August 1944
- Prime Minister: Plaek Phibunsongkhram
- Preceded by: Plaek Phibunsongkhram
- Succeeded by: Sindhu Kamalanavin

Commander-in-chief of the Royal Thai Army
- In office 6 August 1944 – 24 August 1944
- Preceded by: Plaek Phibunsongkhram
- Succeeded by: Phraya Phahonphonphayuhasena

Personal details
- Born: 20 July 1896 Phra Pradaeng, Nakhon Khuan Khan, Siam (now Phra Pradaeng, Samut Prakan, Thailand)
- Died: July 29, 1964 (aged 68) Bangkok, Thailand
- Party: Khana Ratsadon
- Spouse(s): Chuean Kriangsakphichit; Boonlue Peechareon
- Education: Royal Military Academy
- Profession: Soldier

Military service
- Allegiance: Thailand
- Branch/service: Royal Thai Army
- Rank: Lieutenant general
- Commands: Commander-in-Chief
- Battles/wars: Franco-Thai war; World War II

Lieutenant general Luang Kriangsakphichit (personal name Phichit Kriangsakphichit, Thai: พิชิต เกรียงศักดิ์พิชิต; 20 July 1896 – 29 July 1964) was a former army commander in the Franco-Thai War. He also served as Minister of Defence, Minister of Public Health, Member of Parliament, and was a member of Khana Ratsadon.

== Franco-Thai War ==
In 1940, army under Luang Kriangsakphichit captured Champassak which is French Indochina's territories. After the war, Champassak together with other territories formed Nakhon Champassak province.

== Political career ==
Luang Kriangsakphichit was appointed to be minister without portfolio in Plaek Phibunsongkhram's government and later changed to serve as Deputy Minister of Interior. He served as Deputy Minister of Defence In the next cabinet which Plaek served as minister. In 1943, he was appointed to serve as Minister of Defence. Later in 1946, he was appointed to serve as Minister of Public Health in Khuang Aphaiwong's government.

Luang Kriangsakphichit also a Member of the House of Representatives in 1951.

== Military career ==
Phichit graduate Chulachomklao Royal Military Academy in 1914. He started his military career for not long time and had conflict with the commander then resigned from the military. Eight months later he returned. His military career was marked by promotions.

== Honours ==
National honours

- Knight Grand Cross of the Order of the White Elephant
- Knight Grand Cross of the Order of the Crown of Thailand
- Victory Medal - Franco - Thai War
- Safeguarding the Constitution Medal
- Medal for Service Rendered in the Interior - Pacific War
- Chakra Mala Medal
- King Rama VIII Royal Cypher Medal, 2nd Class

Foreign Honours

- Order of the Sacred Treasure, First Class
