= Trad-class torpedo boat =

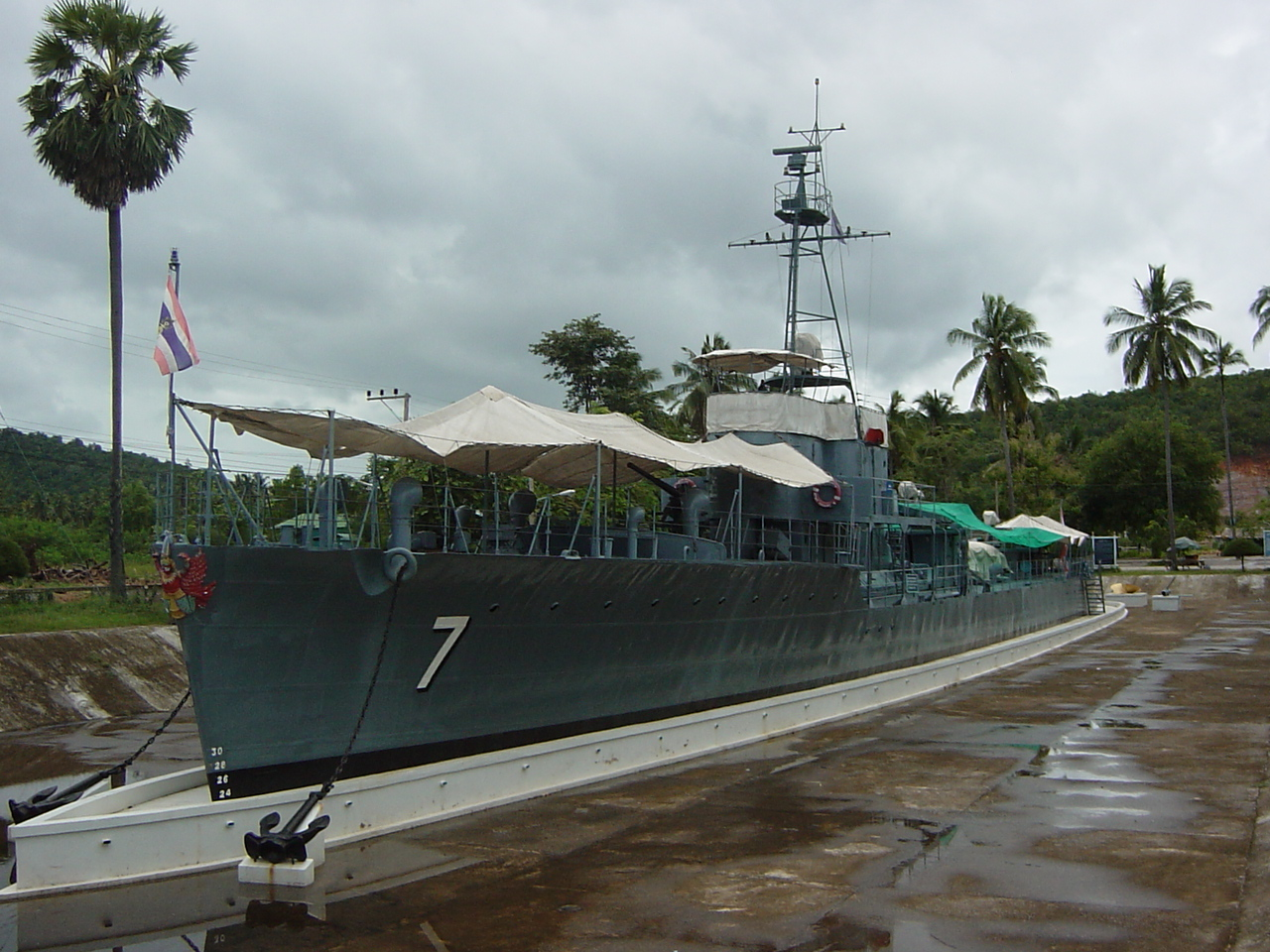
- HTMS Chumpohn preserved as a museum ship

Class overview
- Name: Trad-class torpedo boat
- Builders: Cantieri Riuniti dell'Adriatico, Monfalcone
- Operators: Royal Thai Navy
- Preceded by: Number 1 class
- Succeeded by: Kantang class
- Built: 1934–1938
- In commission: 1935–1977
- Completed: 9
- Lost: 2
- Retired: 7
- Preserved: 1

General characteristics
- Type: Torpedo boat
- Displacement: 318 long tons (323 t) standard
- Length: 67.97 m (223 ft 0 in) o/a
- Beam: 6.4 m (21 ft 0 in)
- Draught: 2.13 m (7 ft 0 in)
- Installed power: 9,000 shp (6,700 kW)
- Propulsion: Geared Steam turbines; 2 shafts
- Speed: 31 knots (57 km/h; 36 mph)
- Armament: 3 × 76 mm (3 in) guns; 2 × 20 mm (0.8 in) cannon; 4 × 8 mm (0.31 in) machine guns; 6 × 450 mm (18 in) torpedo tubes

The Trad class was a class of nine torpedo boats built for the Royal Thai Navy in the 1930s by the Italian shipbuilder Cantieri Riuniti dell'Adriatico. They entered service between 1935 and 1938. Two of the ships were sunk (and a third badly damaged) by French warships at the Battle of Ko Chang in 1941, but the remaining seven ships had long careers, remaining in service until the 1970s.

== Construction and design ==
In 1934, the Royal Thai Navy launched a major re-equipment programme, with orders split between Italy and Japan. In 1934, Thailand ordered nine torpedo boats (the Trad class) and two minelayers from the Italian shipyard Cantieri Riuniti dell'Adriatico (CRDA), with two coast defence ships (the Thonburi class), three small torpedo boats (the Kantan class), two sloops and four submarines ordered from Japan in 1935.

The Italian design resembled a smaller version of the Spica-class torpedo boats building for the Italian Navy. They were 67.97 metres (223 ft 0 in) long overall and 66.75 m (219 ft 0 in) between perpendiculars, with a beam of 6.4 m (21 ft 0 in) and a mean draught of 2.13 m (7 ft 0 in). Displacement was 318 long tons (323 t) standard and 470 long tons (480 t) full load. Two Yarrow boilers supplied steam for two sets of Parsons geared steam turbines, which drove two propeller shafts. The machinery was rated at 9,000 shaft horsepower (6,700 kW), giving a contract speed of 31 knots (57 km/h; 36 mph), with Trad reaching a speed of 32.54 kn (60.26 km/h; 37.45 mph) at 10,000 shp (7,500 kW) during sea trials. 102 long tons (104 t) of oil was carried, giving a range of 1,700 nautical miles (3,100 km; 2,000 mi) at 15 knots (28 km/h; 17 mph).

The ship's main armament was supplied by Vickers-Armstrongs, to be compatible with existing British-built ships in the Thai Navy. Three 76 mm (3 in) anti-aircraft guns were carried, backed up by a close-in armament of two 20 mm (0.8 in) cannon and four machine guns. Six 457 mm (18 in) torpedo tubes were fitted, with two twin mounts on the ships' centerlines and two single tubes mounted forward at the break of the forecastle. Crew was 70 officers and other ranks. By 1971, the surviving ships' armament had been revised, with one of the 76 mm guns and the two single torpedo tubes removed from all of the class, and one of the twin torpedo tube mounts removed from Trad, Phuket and Chumporn. This allowed the addition of one or two 40 mm (1.6 in) Bofors guns.

The ships were built at CRDA's Monfalcone shipyard, with the first two launched in 1935, with four more following in 1936 and the remaining three in 1937.

thumb

== Service ==
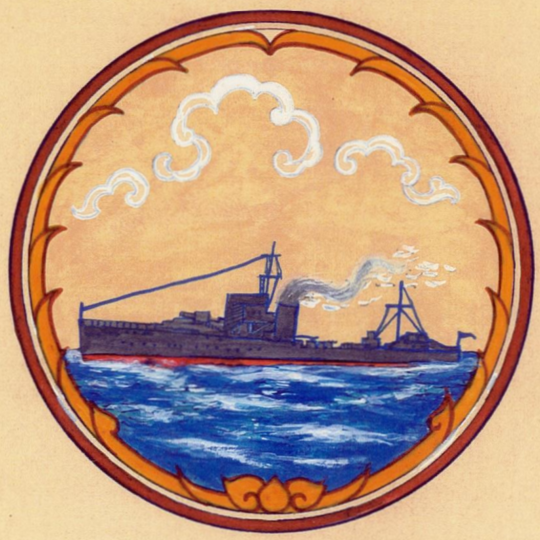
HTMS Trad was selected to be used as the seal of Trat Province in 1941 in memorial to the Battle of Ko Chang, later changed to the current design which depicted a view of Ko Chang with a fishery boat and pontoons in the sea (date unknown).

The first two ships (Trad and Phuket) arrived in Bangkok on 19 April 1936, with the next two (Pattani and Surasdra) reaching Thailand by the end of the year, and the remaining five commissioning in Italy in March 1937. In January 1941, Thailand attacked French Indochina in the Franco-Thai War. As a response to the Thai successes on land, on 17 January 1941 a French Navy force, consisting of the cruiser Lamotte-Picquet and four sloops, attacked a Thai force including the coast defence ship Thonburi together with three Trad-class torpedo boats, Trad, Cholburi and Songkla in the Battle of Ko Chang. Thonburi ran aground and was damaged, and Chonbori and Songkla were sunk, while Trad was badly damaged. The remaining ships stayed in service until the 1970s, with the last ship retiring in 1977. The Chumpohn would later become a museum ship and can be visited today while the Pattani and Surat were sunk as targets.

The wrecks of the Chonburi and Songkhla have been discovered, surveyed, and documented by the Royal Thai Navy but the documentary released is poor and does not show the state of the wrecks beyond that they are intact.

== Ships ==
Note: Construction and delivery dates vary between sources.

Construction data
| Name | Pennant no. | Laid down | Launched | Commissioned | Fate |
|---|---|---|---|---|---|
| HTMS Trad | 11 | 9 February 1934 | 26 October 1935 (Note: 29 September 1935 according to Whitley.) | 19 April 1936 | Sunk as target ship by Gabriel Missile launches from HTMS Hanhak Sudtru and HTMS Prabporapak, with guns installed as saluting guns at Wichaiprasit fortress |
| HTMS Phuket | 12 | 7 January 1934 | 28 September 1935 (Note: 26 October 1935 according to Whitley.) | 19 April 1936 | Scrapped with guns installed as saluting guns at Wichaiprasit fortress |
| HTMS Pattani | 13 | 31 March 1935 | 16 October 1936 (Note: 28 November 1936 according to Whitley.) | Late 1936 | Sunk as a target ship for the first Thai Exocet missile launch from HTMS Wittayakom |
| HTMS Surasdra | 21 | 31 March 1935 | 28 November 1936 (Note: 14 November 1936 according to Whitley.) | Late 1936 | Sunk as target ship by HTMS Bangpakong using a C-801 anti ship missile on the 7th of July 1994 |
| HTMS Chandaburi | 22 | 6 June 1936 | 16 December 1936 (Note: 28 November 1936 according to Whitley, 18 January 1937 according to Conways.) | March 1937 | Scrapped |
| HTMS Rayong | 23 | 6 June 1936 | 11 January 1937 (Note: 16 December 1936 according to Whitley.) | March 1937 | Scrapped |
| HTMS Chumpohn | 31 | 7 July 1936 | 18 January 1937 (Note: 12 January 1937 according to Whitley.) | March 1937 | Turned into a museum ship |
| HTMS Chonburi | 32 | 22 August 1936 | 10 February 1937 (Note: 18 January 1937 according to Whitley.) | March 1937 | Sunk 17 January 1941 at the battle of Koh Chang |
| HTMS Songkla | 33 | 29 August 1936 | 9 February 1937 (Note: 10 February 1937 according to Whitley.) | March 1937 | Sunk 17 January 1941 at the battle of Koh Chang |
