= Battle of Banphlao =

1941 battle of the Franco-Thai War

Battle of Ban Phrao สมรภูมิบ้านพร้าว
- Part of the Franco-Thai War
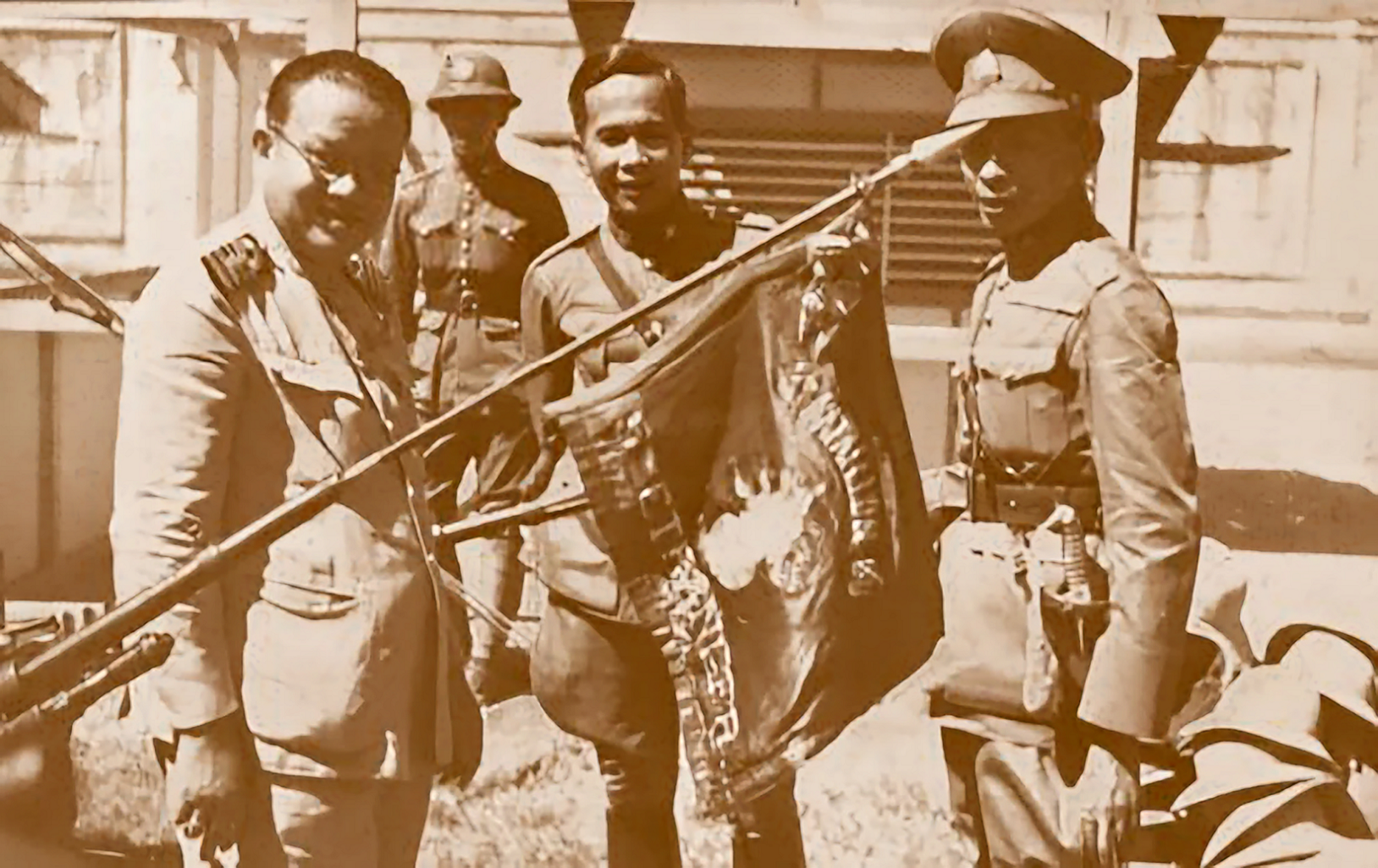
- Plaek Phibunsongkhram (center) and Prayoon Yuthasastrkosol (left) observing a captured flag of the Foreign Infantry Regiment, after defeating them at the Battle of Ban Phrao
Date	16 January 1941
Location	Phum Preav, Serei Saophoan (now Banteay Meanchey), Cambodia, French Indochina
Result	Thai decisive victory

Belligerents
Thailand	Vichy France: French Indochina

Commanders and leaders
Khun Nimman Kalayut	Maj. Belloc †

Casualties and losses
Thai claims: 1 killed 2 wounded French claims: 300-800 killed or wounded	French claims: 35 killed 20 wounded Thai claims: 49or 400 killed 20 or 200 captured

The Battle of Banphlao, Battle of Ban Phrao (Thai: สมรภูมิบ้านพร้าว) (Khmer: សមរភូមិភូមិព្រាវ) or Battle of Phum Preav occurred in the early morning of January 16, 1941, in the Phum Preav area of Cambodia which was then under Thai occupation and called Ban Phrao in Thai language. Both Phum Preav in Khmer language and Ban Phrao in Thai language mean "the coconut village". This was a significant victory for Thailand in the Indochina dispute. The Thai government claimed that the 3rd Infantry Battalion (led by Khun Nimman Kalayut "ขุนนิมมาณกลยุทธ" or "นิ่ม ชโยดม") ambushed the French troops (led by Major Belloc), defeating them and killed over 400 French soldiers and captured many while only one Thai soldier died. However, the battalion's commander, Khun Kalayut, himself estimated French casualties at 49 killed and 110 wounded. As for French prisoners, only 20 were actually captured.

In this battle, Thailand seized French strongholds and their regimental flag, and it was described as a brilliant strategy and a "legendary act of heroism".

== Background ==
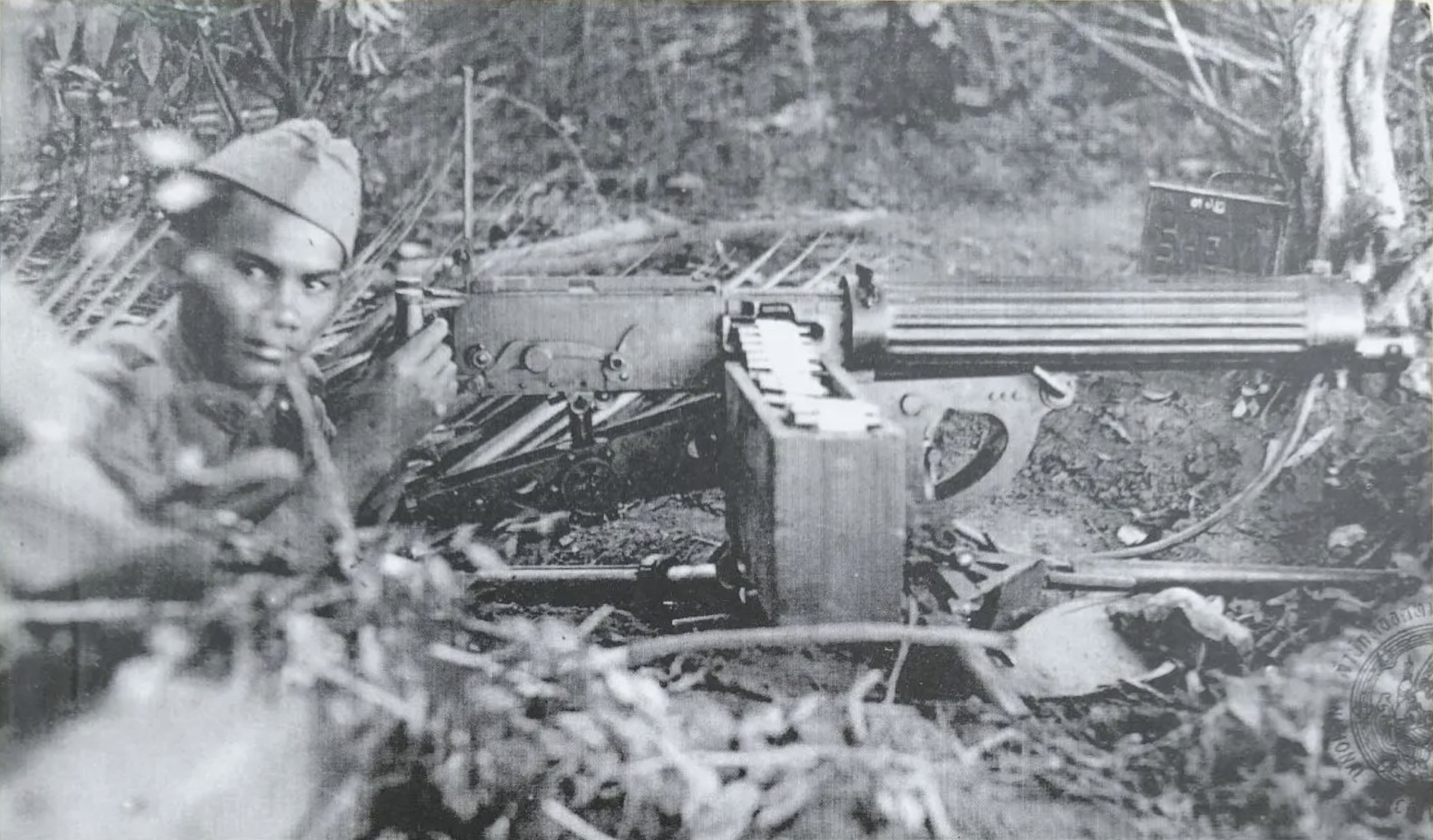
Thai soldier with a Vickers Machine Gun during the Battle of Ban Phrao in 1941 (Franco-Thai War).

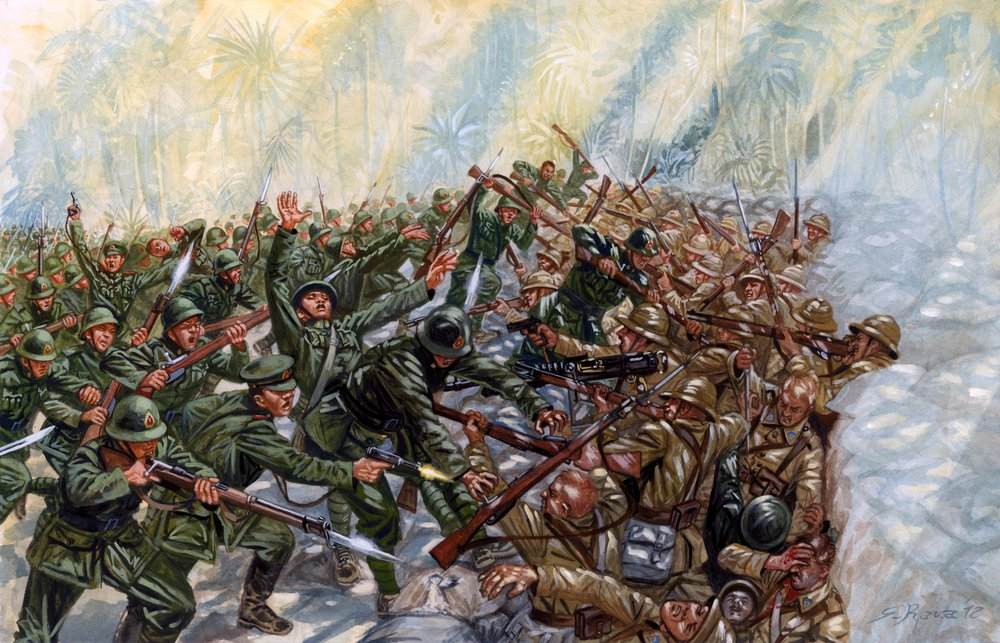
Illustration of the Battle of Ban Phrao between the 3rd Battalion of Phra Nakhon Division, Burapha Army (now 2nd King Close Bodyguard Battalion, 1st King Close Bodyguard Regiment) and the 3rd Battalion of the 5th Foreign Regiment, French Foreign Legion (3/5e REI) at 16 January 1941.

The 3rd Infantry Battalion of Thailand, commanded by Major Khun Nimmanakalyut, led his troops to secure territory east of Cambodia, along border markers 43 to 46, and advanced into French Indochina, which was formerly Thai territory starting on December 23, 1940.

At the Battle of Ban Phrao, approximately 10 kilometers from Thai territory into Cambodia, which was also formerly Thai territory, Major Khun Nimmanakalyut was ordered to lead his troops to seize the battlefield on January 13, 1941. When he moved his forces to Ban Phrao, he found remnants of an old, well-modified foreign military camp from Indochina. There was no resistance because the enemy had withdrawn, allowing the Thai forces to seize the area before later launching a coordinated attack to destroy the 3rd Infantry Battalion at Ban Phrao. After surveying the terrain, Major Khun Nimmanakalyut, the battalion commander, concluded that seizing Ban Phrao would not be necessary. Because the French were aware of their position, and in the evening, after the Thai forces had seized the area, they were ambushed by a French reconnaissance unit. After surveying the terrain in front of the Thai line, they deemed it more suitable and requested permission to move their forces 4 kilometers from their original position to Huai Yang, a dry stream bed. The terrain, with its easily adaptable trenches, provided ample firing range. French troops had also constructed a makeshift road from the north to Ban Phrao. This road proved highly advantageous for the Thais' positioning. They deployed their forces in a U-shape, or shark's mouth shape, straddling the road at Huai Yang.

== See also ==
- Franco-Thai War
