= Khana Lueat Thai =

Anti-Catholic movement in 1940s Thailand

Khana Lueat Thai คณะเลือดไทย
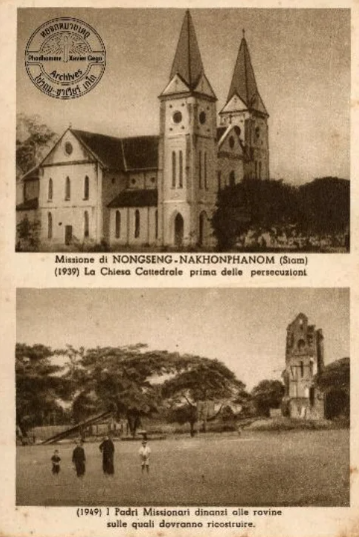
- A before and after juxtaposition of the Nongseng–Nakhon Phanom Catholic mission in Siam, which was destroyed due to anti-Catholic beliefs promoted by Khana Lueat Thai
- Leader: Prasert Tharisawat
- Founded: 10 September 1940
- Dissolved: c. 1944
- Headquarters: Bangkok, Chiang Mai, and Phanat Nikhom district
- Ideology: Thai Ultranationalism, Pan-Thaiism, Anti-Imperialism, Anti-Catholicism

Khana Lueat Thai (Thai: คณะเลือดไทย, lit. 'Party/Group of Thai Blood'; also known as Khana Luad/Lu'at Thai) Was an ultra-nationalist Thai movement active in the early 1940s. It emerged within wartime Thailand (then Siam) under Field Marshal Plaek Phibunsongkhram's military regime and promoted aggressive pan-Thai nationalism while carrying strong anti-Western sentiments. The group's members claimed to be devoted patriots of the country ("Khon rak chat") and identified foreign influences, primarily Catholicism, as enemies of the Thai nation, as Siam was at war with the French over land claims in French Indochina at the time. Historians note that Khana Lueat Thai worked alongside Phibunsongkhram's government, which also funded it, to promote anti-imperialist and anti-Catholic policies, despite the fact that it operated semi-clandestinely and was not an official political party.

== Etymology ==
The literal meaning of Khana Lueat Thai was the "Party/Group of Thai Blood", and as a nationalist slogan, it emphasized racial and cultural pride which eventually escalated into ultranationalism and pan-Thaiism. Members of the group were urged to rebuke individuals identifying as Catholics and see the religion as a foreign religion that belonged to their enemies. The term "เลือดไทย" ("lueat thai") in the group's name played itself on the notion of "Thai Blood", a common motif in Phibunsongkhram's nationalist regime in Thailand.

== Historical context ==
Thai territorial gains in Laos and Cambodia during the Franco-Thai War

Khana Lueat Thai arose during the tumultuous period of World War II, especially amid the Franco-Thai War of 1940-1941, in which the Thai nation itself was also at war. In late 1940 to early 1941, Thailand clashed with Vichy France over territories situated in French Indochina, causing Thai troops to seize parts of Cambodia and Laos and briefly annexing them. These events were also accompanied by a surge of ultranationalist fervor, in which the state under Phibunsongkhram's government actively promoted ethnonationalist propaganda known as the "Thai Cultural Mandates" while also encouraging mobilization against colonial powers. Phibunsongkhram adopted an aggressive anti-imperialist stance, supporting war claims to "recover" lands lost to France. Fostered in this type of atmosphere, Khana Lueat Thai was able to rapidly grow up as a grass-roots extension of the state's ideology. Scholars note that the 1940 border war "coincided with the beginning of a 4-year campaign to weaken the Catholic Church's position in Thailand" At this point in time, the French colonial empire was in decline, and Catholicism was strongly associated with French culture, making Catholic institutions easy victims of anti-French sentiments.

== Ideology ==
Khana Lueat Thai adopted a chauvinist form of Thai nationalism, embracing pan-Thaiist and irredent ideas as well as "reclaiming" territories in Cambodia and Laos thought to be historically Thai. The propaganda derived from it often emphasized racial purity and viewed religious minorities as traitors, discriminating against them. Leaflets and flyers were distributed that urged citizens to boycott "enemy" business and culture. This ideological stance also happened to align itself with Phibunsongkhram's state policy, which also promoted xenophobic nationalism while imposing restrictions on Catholic worship.

== Founding and leadership ==
The origins of Khana Lueat Thai are somewhat contested, as no single charter or manifesto survives and the group operated semi-secretly. According to some accounts, it was established in Bangkok on 10 September 1940, by the civil servant Prasert Tharisawat who headed this movement, later spreading it to the provinces into areas such as Chiang Mai, where chapters have been documented to exist.

A 1941 Vatican report notes that the perpetrators of anti-Christian attacks "gathered themselves together as the 'Khana Lueat Thai,' boasting that they were supported by the government". This suggests that the movement had at least implicit state sponsorship, and in later Thai accounts, Khana Lueat Thai was described as a popular mass movement coordinating officials and citizens alike. According to these accounts, Khana Lueat Thai "served to coordinate groups of civil servants, merchants, students, monks, and ordinary people" In effect, it functioned as a mobilizing link between government officials and ordinary people during the anti-French campaigns, though it was not constituted as a formal political party and its organization remained relatively informal.

== Activities ==
During the organization's brief prominence in 1940-41, it mobilized both rhetoric and violence. Its members harassed and occasionally assaulted Catholic and French sympathizers, committed arson and vandalized churches, and encouraged boycotts of French businesses. The movement worked closely with Phibunsongkhram's wartime propaganda and helped amplify its nationalist themes and propaganda. In areas such as Nakhon Phanom and Sakon Nakhon, missionaries reported threats, broken windows, and local officials doing nothing to stop it.

A report on Thai foreign policy notes that the group aimed to "not only to gain Laos but also to the whole of Cambodia, disregarding the difference between absolute sovereignty and suzerainty in history." The motives behind such acts were beliefs that Thailand was to either "Become a Power or be swallowed up by some other Power," as was stated by Luang Wichitwathakan in a lecture.

The movement's more extreme anti-Christian actions contributed to concern among some Thai officials and diplomats, who feared that escalation of violence against Catholics could harm Thailand's international reputation or complicate relations with foreign powers. At times, the Thai Foreign Ministry was forced to moderate and distance itself from Khana Lueat Thai's extremist messaging.

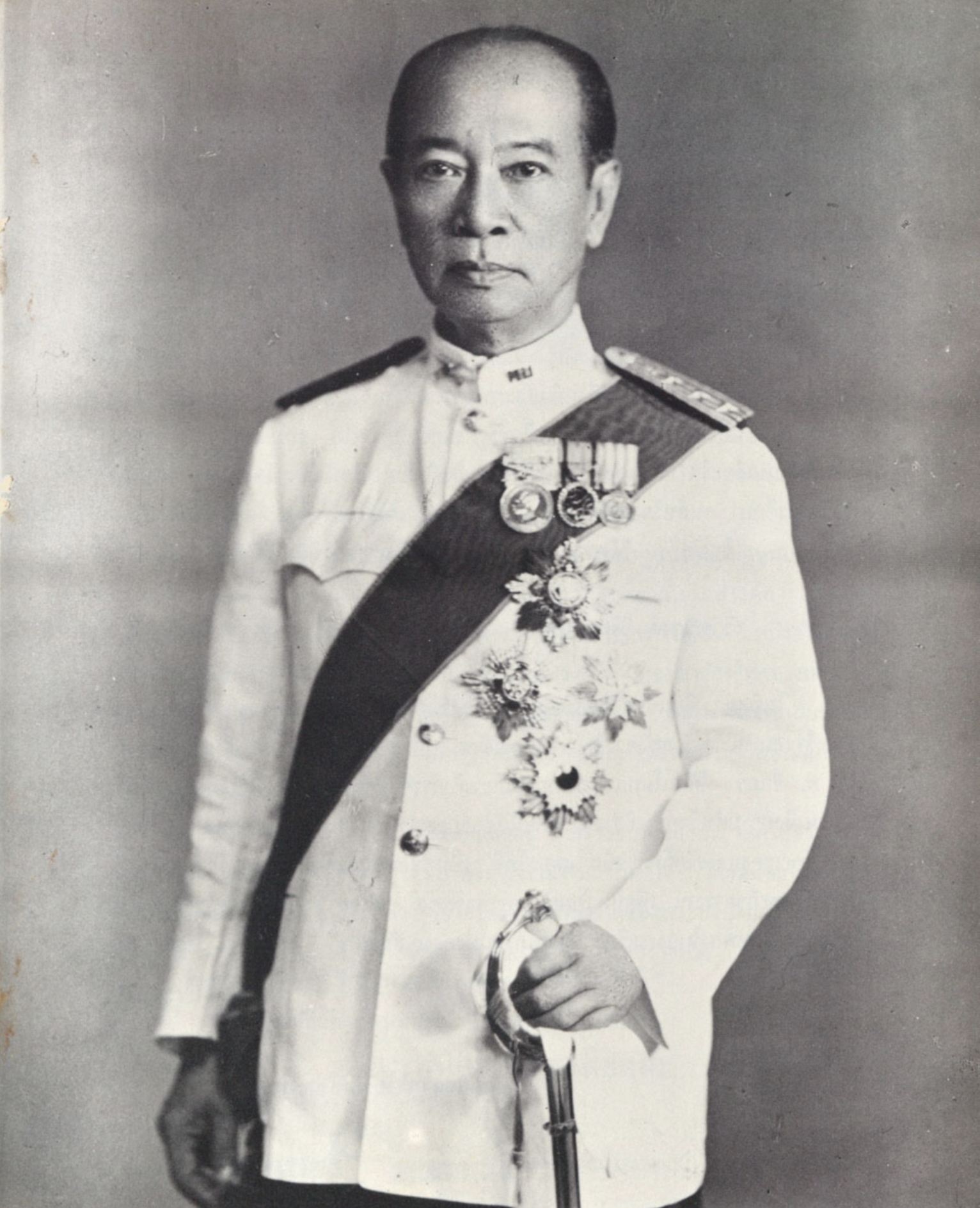
Luang Wichitwathakan

== Use of propaganda and media ==
Khana Lueat Thai's rhetoric circulated through pamphlets, leaflets, and public messaging during 1940-41, which helped spread and echo the ultranationalist campaign of the Phibunsongkhram regime that were particularly targeted at the French and Catholic communities.

In addition to this, Luang Wichitwathakan, who was noted to play a large role in wartime nationalist ideology, promoted themes of Thai racial unity and sacrifice through his speeches and theatrical works, such as Lu'ad Suphan. These historical plays were produced in close collaboration with the government's cultural and propaganda agencies, which portrayed episodes of Thai resistance against the foreign powers. Radio Thailand and the Publicity Department broadcast Wichitwathakan's patriotic songs and dramatic works as part of the state's cultural program, which was designed to instill nationalism and emotional loyalty to the state. At the same time, censorship measures enacted during the early 1940s expanded state control over the press, enabling the suppression of dissenting voices during wartime. Criticism of official nationalist policies was restricted due to emergency press regulations that were enacted by Phibunsongkhram.

== Relationship to the State ==
Khana Lueat Thai operated within the broader ideological climate during Phibunsongkhram's wartime nationalism, and despite never having been an official organ of the state, its ultranationalist messaging aligned well with the government's cultural mandates. The cultural mandates supported by Phibunsongkhram's government promoted patriotic behavior, dress, and speech, and as such, Khana Lueat Thai's calls for vigilance against foreign influences were often tolerated by local officials, as they aligned with the widely accepted state nationalism. Appeals for tolerance by the Catholics were often censored or ignored. After the Franco-Thai peace settlement, however, attacks decreased and tension cooled as diplomatic priorities shifted.

== Decline and dissolution ==
After the end of the Franco-Thai War in 1941, the Khana Lueat Thai movement gradually lost momentum, and public interest for militant nationalism waned. Sources often attribute the signing of the Tokyo peace treaty to this phenomenon, as it reduced the sense of national emergency that had previously fueled the militant patriotic activism. Intelligence reports and later historical studies have noted that nationalist street campaigns eventually gave way to state-directed messaging that emphasized Thailand's partnership with Japan rather than internalized mobilization. By 1942, references to Khana Lueat Thai disappeared from the official press, and by 1944, it disappeared entirely from state discourse.

== Legacy ==
After World War II, Khana Lueat Thai faded into obscurity as Thailand's new democratic leaders and intellectuals sought to downplay its existence, in part due to it being associated with the authoritarian wartime political climate and aggression that no longer fit the narrative of democratization. In the 1970s, discussion regarding Khana Lueat Thai began to resurface as scholars started reassessing Phibunsongkhram's ideological programs. Works from this period have noted the authoritarian tendencies of wartime propaganda, as well as the intellectual networks that revolved around Luang Wichitwathakan. Today, Khana Lueat Thai is regarded by historians as a notable case study on the risks of nationalism when fueled by xenophobia.

== See also ==
- Martyrs of Songkhon
- Catholic Church in Thailand
- Anti-Catholicism
