= Sindh Kamalanavin =

Thai politician

Sindh Kamalanavin MPCh MWM
- สินธุ์ กมลนาวิน
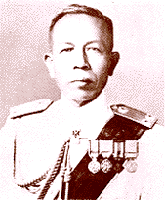

Commanders-in-Chief of the Royal Thai Navy
- In office 1 may 1944 – 31 Aunty 1945
- Preceded by: Phraya Wichanworajak
- Succeeded by: Luang Pholasinthanawat
- In office 11 January – 1 May 1934
- Preceded by: Phraya Wichcitcholathai
- Succeeded by: Phraya Wichanworajak

President of Kasetsart University
- In office 28 September 1943 – 27 September 1945
- Preceded by: Position established
- Succeeded by: Thawi Bunyaket
Ministerial offices 1935–1945
Minister of Defense
In office 2 August 1944 – 31 August 1945
Prime Minister	Khuang Aphaiwong
Preceded by	Phichit Kriangsakphichit
Succeeded by	Chit Munsilpa Sinadyodharaksa
Minister of Agriculture
In office 7 March 1942 – 31 August 1945
Prime Minister	Plaek Phibunsongkhram; Khuang Aphaiwong
Preceded by	Dej Snidvongs
Succeeded by	Thawi Bunyaket
Minister of Economy
In office 16 February – 6 March 1942
Prime Minister	Plaek Phibunsongkhram
Preceded by	Pao Pienlert Boripanyutakit
Succeeded by	Charun Rattanakun Seriroengrit
Minister of Education
In office 1 August 1935 – 16 February 1942
Preceded by	Chuen Charuwat
Succeeded by	Plaek Phibunsongkhram

Personal details
- Born: Sindh (Note: At that time, Thailand did not have surnames); 23 June 1901 Samut Prakan, Siam
- Died: 14 April 1976 (aged 74) Bangkok, Thailand
- Party: Khana Ratsadon
- Spouse: Chintana Nutiprapha
- Children: 4

Military service
- Allegiance: Siam (later Thailand)
- Branch/service: Royal Thai Navy
- Years of service: 1927–1951
- Rank: Admiral
- Battles/wars: Siamese Revolution

Sindh Kamalanavin (Note: Thai: สินธุ์ กมลนาวิน, RTGS: Sin Kamonnawin) (23 June 1901 – 14 May 1976), commonly known as Luang Sinthusongkhramchai (Thai: หลวงสินธุสงครามชัย) was a Thai admiral who served as Commander-in-Chief of the Royal Thai Navy in 1934 and then from 1938 to 1951, holding various ministerial roles throughout his career. During the Siamese Revolution of 1932, he emerged as a prominent leader of the Navy faction within the Khana Ratsadon. His efforts to reform the Navy were instrumental in its modernization, notably introducing Thailand’s first submarines.

== Life ==
Sindh graduated from Suankularb Wittayalai School in 1914 and pursued naval studies in Denmark on a government scholarship. While arriving in Paris in 1928, he joined Khana Ratsadon by Thawi Bunyaket's invitation and became the navy faction's leader. His role in the revolution: As the leader of the navy faction, he was responsible for planning all operations carried out by the navy. The strategy was similar to that of the army faction, which was to deceive and mobilize naval troops and weapons from the Royal Thai Navy Transport Battalion's arsenal (located in the area of present-day Ratchaworadit Pier), and move them to the Royal Plaza. According to the plan, the naval group was supposed to arrive at the Royal Plaza first and wait for the arrival of the army group at 6:00 a.m. In reality, however, the army group actually arrived at 6:05 a.m. After the 1932 Revolution, he was appointed to several ministerial roles, naval commander-in-chief, and the first president of Kasetsart University. He is credited with coining the Thai term for “submarine” (เรือดำน้ำ). He also oversaw the introduction of Thailand’s first submarines, the Matchanu-class, into naval service.

Following the Manhattan Rebellion in 1951, Sindh was removed from his position as naval commander and, despite his lack of involvement, was convicted of treason and imprisoned for three years.

He died on 14 May 1976.

== Notes ==
Political offices
Preceded by Phra Sarasatpraphan	Minister of Education; 1935–1942	Succeeded by Luang Phibunsongkhram
Preceded by Phra Boripanyutakit	Minister of Economy; 1942	Succeeded by Luang Seriroengrit
Preceded by Phra Vejayantarungsarit	Minister of Agriculture; 1942–1945	Succeeded by Thawi Bunyaket
Preceded by Phichit Kriangsakphichit	Minister of Defence; 1944–1945	Succeeded by Chit Munsilpa Sinadyodharaksa
Party political offices
First	Head of the navy faction of the Khana Ratsadon; 1929–1947	Abolished position
Military offices
Preceded by Phraya Wichcitcholathai	Commander-in-chief of the Royal Siamese Navy acting 1934	Succeeded by Phraya Wichanworajak
Preceded by Phraya Wichanworajak	Commander-in-chief of the Royal Thai Navy; 1938–1951	Succeeded by Luang Pholasinthanawat
Academic offices
Preceded by Phra Sarasatpraphan	President of the Chulalongkorn University Council; 1935–1942	Succeeded by Prayoon Pamornmontri
Preceded by Phra Sarasatpraphan	President of the University of Moral and Political Sciences Council; 1935–1942	Succeeded by Prayoon Pamornmontri
First	President of the Kasetsart University Council; 1942–1945	Succeeded by Thawi Bunyaket
Educational offices
First	President of Kasetsart University; 1943–1945	Succeeded by Thawi Bunyaket
