= Anglo-Thai Non-Aggression Pact =

1940 treaty

The Anglo-Thai Non-Aggression Pact was concluded in Bangkok on 12 June 1940 between the governments of the United Kingdom and the Kingdom of Thailand. It was concluded as part of the British policy, which was to refrain from resisting by force the actions of the Japanese Empire in East Asia, as Thailand was about to become Japan's ally.

Ratifications were exchanged in Bangkok on 31 August 1940, and the pact became effective on the same day. It was designated to remain in force for five years, unless it was extended. The pact was registered in League of Nations Treaty Series on 6 June 1941.

In spite of the pact, Thailand declared war on the United Kingdom on 25 January 1942.

== Background ==
Following the Japanese invasion of China in 1937, British policy in East Asia was in a state of confusion. The British government opposed Japanese expansionist policies, but at this point was not in a position to take up arms against the Japanese actions, especially following the Tientsin Incident. As a result, it developed a policy of not recognizing legally the changes made by Japanese actions, but at the same time refraining from antagonizing the Japanese government by actual resistance. This policy became evident in the so-called Craigie-Arita formula of July 1939, by which the British government refrained from open opposition to Japanese military actions in China.

This situation continued following the outbreak of the Second World War in Europe in September 1939. On 18 July 1940 the British government accepted the Japanese demands for closing the Burma Road for three months to prevent war supplies to China. In addition, the government of Thailand was now becoming aligned with the Japanese Empire. During the battle of France (May–June 1940), the British government became extremely cautious in this policy, and concluded that pact with Bangkok so as not to antagonize Tokyo.

== Terms ==
Article 1 stipulated the British and Thai governments would not resort to war against each other.

Article 2 provided for the termination of the pact if the British or the Thai governments committed an act of aggression against a third party.

Article 3 annulled any previous obligation by the British or the Thai governments to assist a third party in a war against another.

Article 4 stipulated that nothing in the pact annulled legal obligations that arose from the Covenant of the League of Nations.

Article 5 had the two governments undertake not to disrupt each other's control over its territories.

Article 6 provided for the ratification of the pact.

== See also ==
- Treaty between Thailand and Japan (1940)
