= Matchanu-class submarine =

Thai submarine class

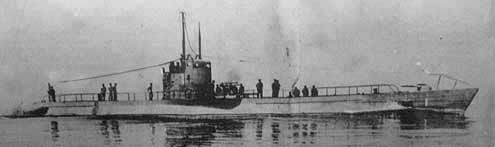
- HTMS Matchanu

Class overview
- Builders: Mitsubishi Heavy Industries
- Operators: Royal Thai Navy
- Built: 1936–38
- In commission: 19 July 1938 – 30 November 1951
- Completed: 4
- Scrapped: 4

General characteristics
- Type: Submarine
- Displacement: 374.5 t (368.6 long tons; 412.8 short tons) (surfaced); 430 t (420 long tons; 470 short tons) (submerged)
- Length: 51.00 m (167.32 ft)
- Beam: 4.10 m (13.5 ft)
- Draught: 3.60 m (11.8 ft)
- Propulsion: 2 × 8-cylinder 1,100 hp (820 kW) diesel engines; 1 × 540 hp (400 kW) electric motor
- Speed: 14.5 kn (26.9 km/h; 16.7 mph) (maximum); 10 kn (19 km/h; 12 mph) (economical)
- Range: 4,770 nmi (8,830 km; 5,490 mi)
- Test depth: 60 m (200 ft)
- Complement: 5 officers & 28 crew
- Armament: 1 × 76/25-mm gun; 1 × 8-mm gun; 4 × 450-mm torpedo tubes

The Matchanu class comprised the only four submarines ever employed by the Royal Thai Navy throughout the 20th century. They were built in Japan by Mitsubishi, and were in commission from 1938 throughout the Franco-Thai War and World War II. The boats were decommissioned following the Manhattan Rebellion in 1951 and the subsequent dissolution of the navy's Submarine Group.

== Construction and design ==
The Royal Siamese Navy (Note: Thailand was known as Siam until 1939) had shown interest in submarines in various procurement proposals dating as early as 1910. However, its expansion plans were limited by financial constraints throughout the early twentieth century. In 1934, Sindhu Kamalanavin, then Chief of Staff of the Navy, led a warship-procurement project which was approved by parliament in 1935. The proposal included a 6.9 million-baht (630,000 GBP at the time) budget for three submarines. Bidding was held in October 1935, and was won by Mitsubishi Heavy Industries of Japan, which offered a price of 820,000 baht (75,000 GBP) each for four boats. Siamese navy officers and sailors were sent to Japan to be trained to operate the submarines by Imperial Japanese Navy personnel.

The submarines were built in Kobe, with the first two being laid down on 6 May 1936. Construction of the others began on 1 October. The first group was launched on 24 December 1936, with the second following on 14 May 1937. The first two submarines were completed and delivered to the Royal Siamese Navy on 4 September 1937, the date the Thai Navy still observes as Submarine Day. The others were delivered on 30 April 1938.

The Thai Navy's submarines were named after characters from the Ramakien, Phra Aphai Mani, and Khun Chang Khun Phaen known for their mythical diving abilities. They are:

- HTMS Matchanu (II)
- HTMS Wirun
- HTMS Sinsamut
- HTMS Phlai-chumphon

The Thai submarines were relatively small, since they were intended primarily for coastal defence. Each had a displacement of 374.5 tonnes (368.6 long tons; 412.8 short tons) on the surface and 430 tonnes (420 long tons; 470 short tons) when submerged. They were armed with four 450-millimetre (18 in) torpedo tubes, plus a 76/25-millimetre (3-inch) deck gun and an 8-millimetre (0.31 in) machine gun.

== Careers ==
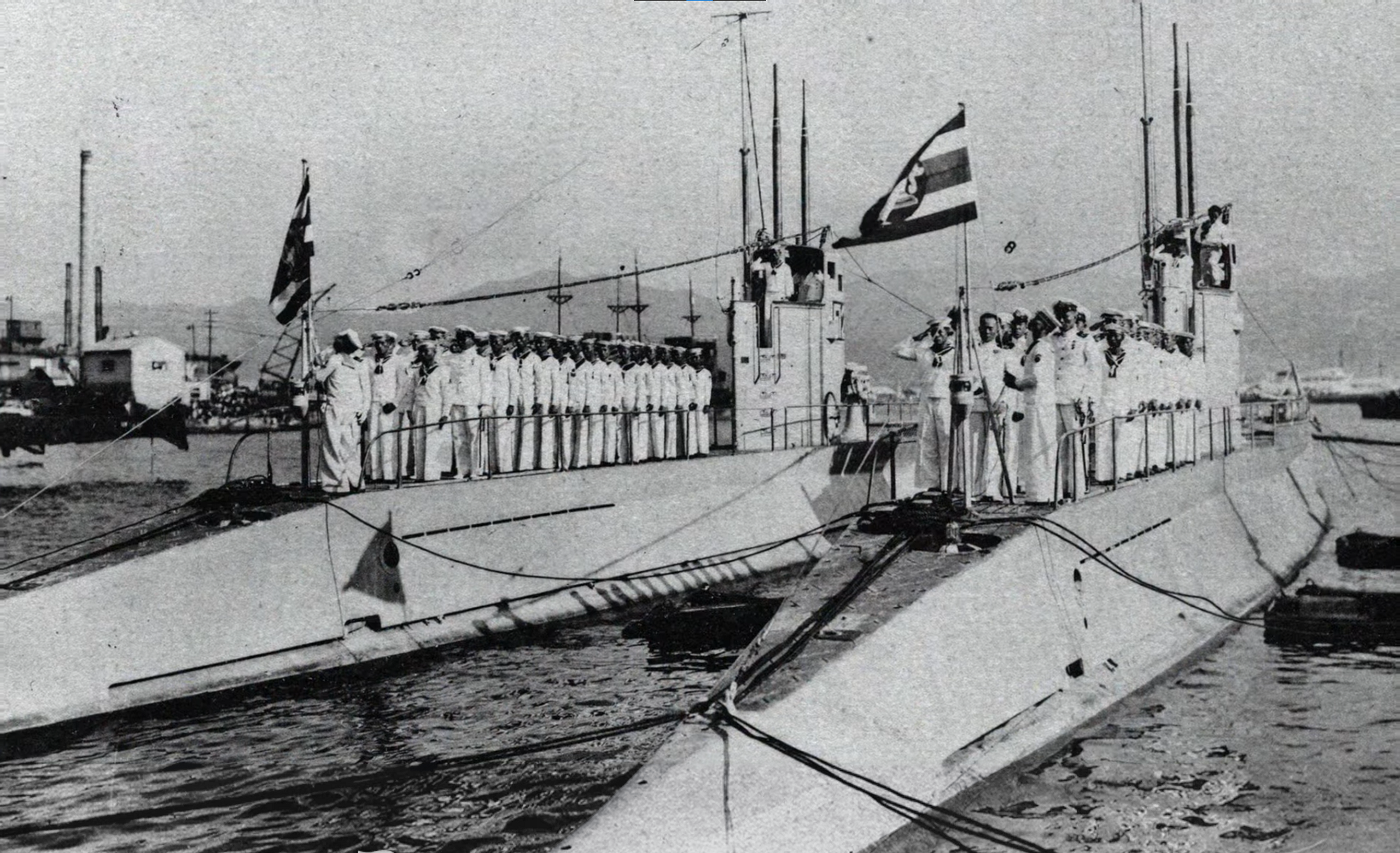
HTMS Matchanu and Wirun at Kobe Port

All four submarines departed Kobe for Thailand on 5 June 1938. They stopped for supplies at Keelung in Japanese-controlled Taiwan on 9 June, and at Manila in the Philippines on 15 June. They arrived at Sattahip Naval Base on 25 June, and were officially welcomed in Bangkok on 29 June. They were commissioned on 19 July, as was the Japan-built coastal defence ship HTMS Sri Ayudhya.

The submarine crews underwent several training exercises in 1938 and 1939. In November 1940, following a number of border skirmishes, the undeclared Franco-Thai War over disputed border areas began when the Royal Thai Air Force made air raids on military bases in French Indochina. The navy was mobilised to protect Thailand's territorial waters, and the submarines conducted reconnaissance in the Gulf of Thailand. However, they were unable to prevent a surprise French naval raid, which resulted in heavy Thai naval losses at the Battle of Ko Chang on 17 January 1941. Following the battle, the submarines were sent to patrol the vicinity of Ream Naval Base in present-day Cambodia, but no further naval clashes took place and Japan soon negotiated an end to the war.

The submarines remained in service throughout World War II, which Thailand officially joined in January 1942, but they saw no combat. However, two of them did serve an unconventional role during the war. On 14 April 1945, five months before the Japanese surrender, Bangkok's Samsen and Wat Liab Power Plants were bombed during Allied air raids, leaving the capital city without electricity. In response to a request from the Bangkok Electricity Authority, the Matchanu and Wirun anchored at the Bangkok Dock Company and served as power generators for one of Bangkok's tram lines.

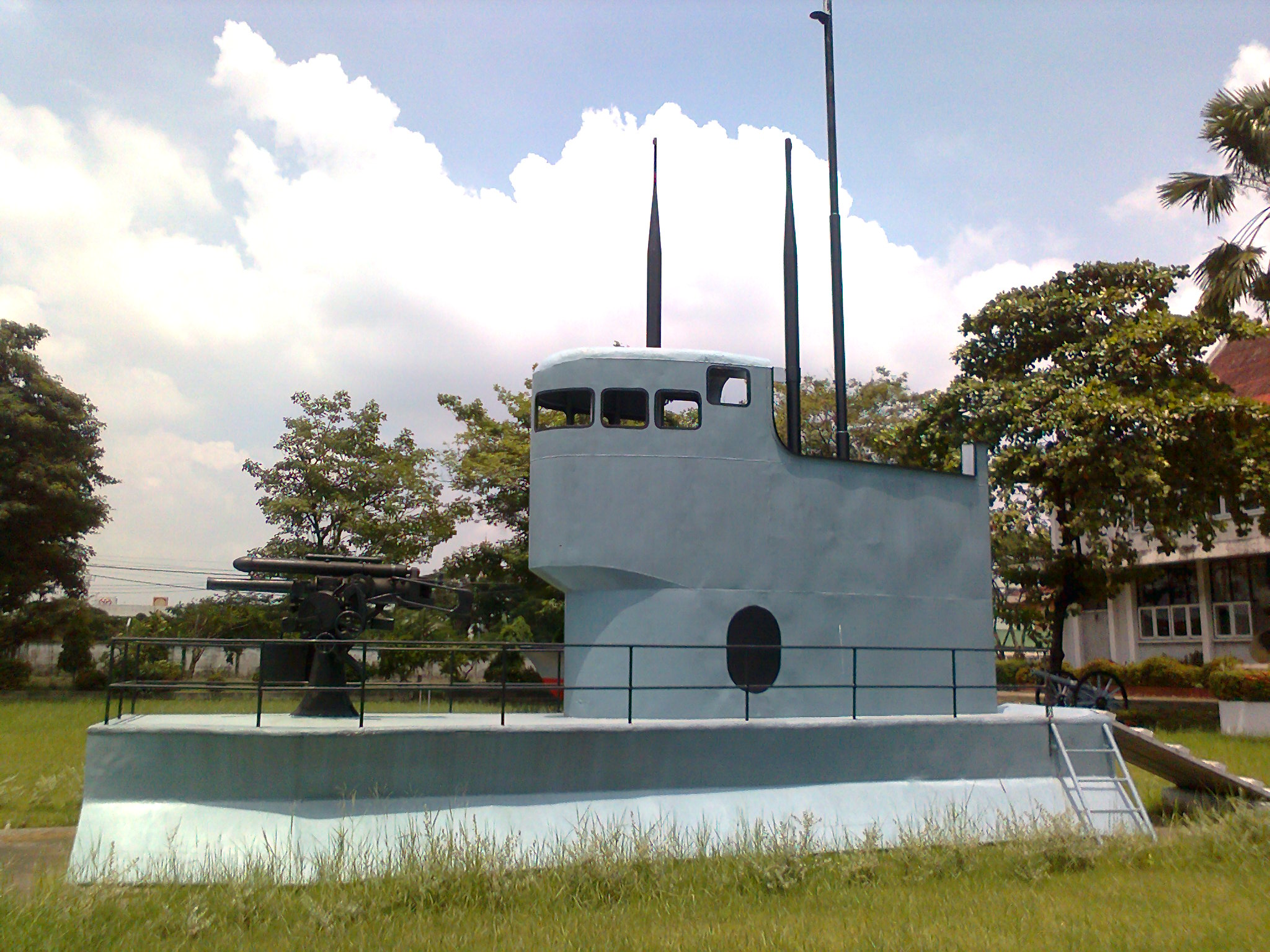
The superstructure of the Matchanu is preserved at the Naval Museum.

After the war's end, supplies and parts for the submarines became unavailable because of the Allied occupation and disarmament of Japan. In addition, the Royal Thai Navy's battery factory was unable to produce the powerful batteries needed for the submarines. The Thai submarine service came to an end following a coup attempt against the military government of Plaek Pibunsongkhram known as the Manhattan Rebellion. The failed coup, led by a group of naval officers on 29 June 1951, led to the Navy's being stripped of its power and influence. The Submarine Group was dissolved on 16 July, and all four boats were decommissioned on 30 November 1951.

The submarines were moored for some time in the Chao Phraya River near Siriraj Hospital Pier, but they were finally sold to the Siam Cement Company for scrap. Part of the superstructure of the Matchanu is preserved at the Naval Museum in Samut Prakan Province, almost the only reminder that Thailand once had a submarine fleet.

Since the 1990s, the Royal Thai Navy has pursued several efforts to re-establish submarine capability. In 2017, it ordered a variant of the Type 039A from China.

== Gallery ==
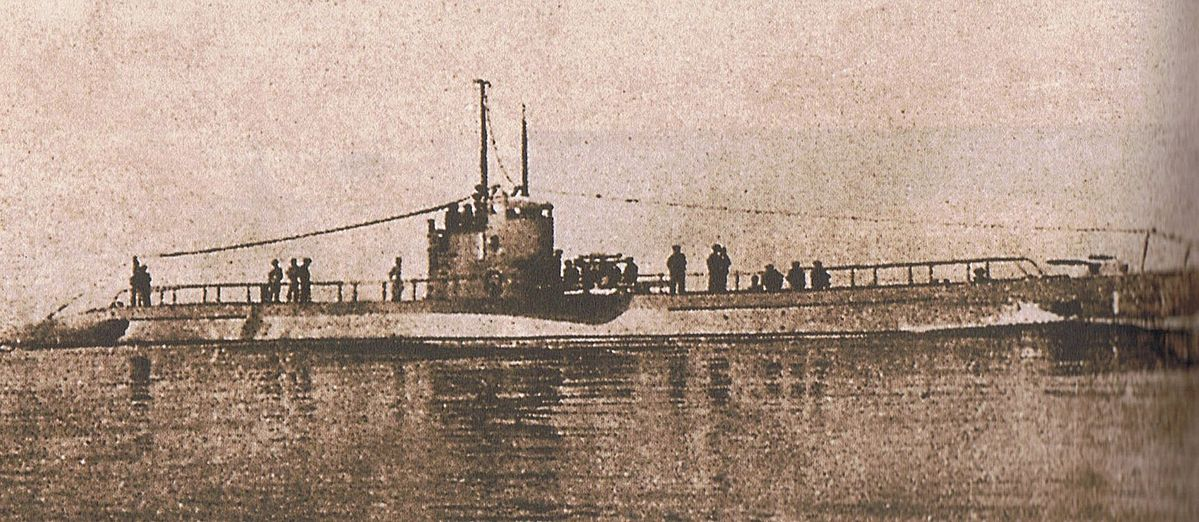
Pre-War photograph of HTMS Matchanu, 1938.

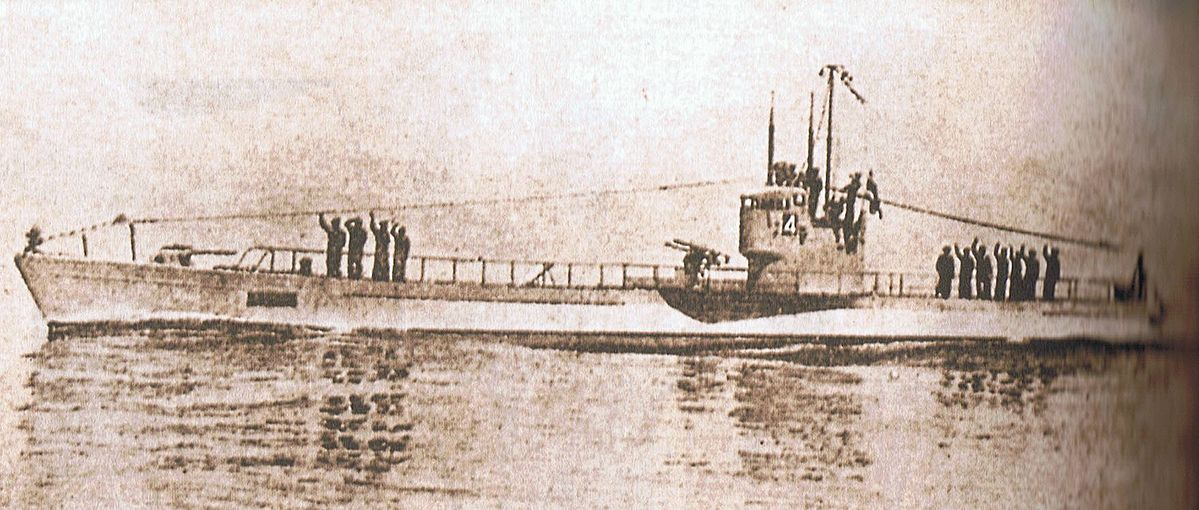
Pre-War photograph of HTMS Phlai-chumpon, 1938.

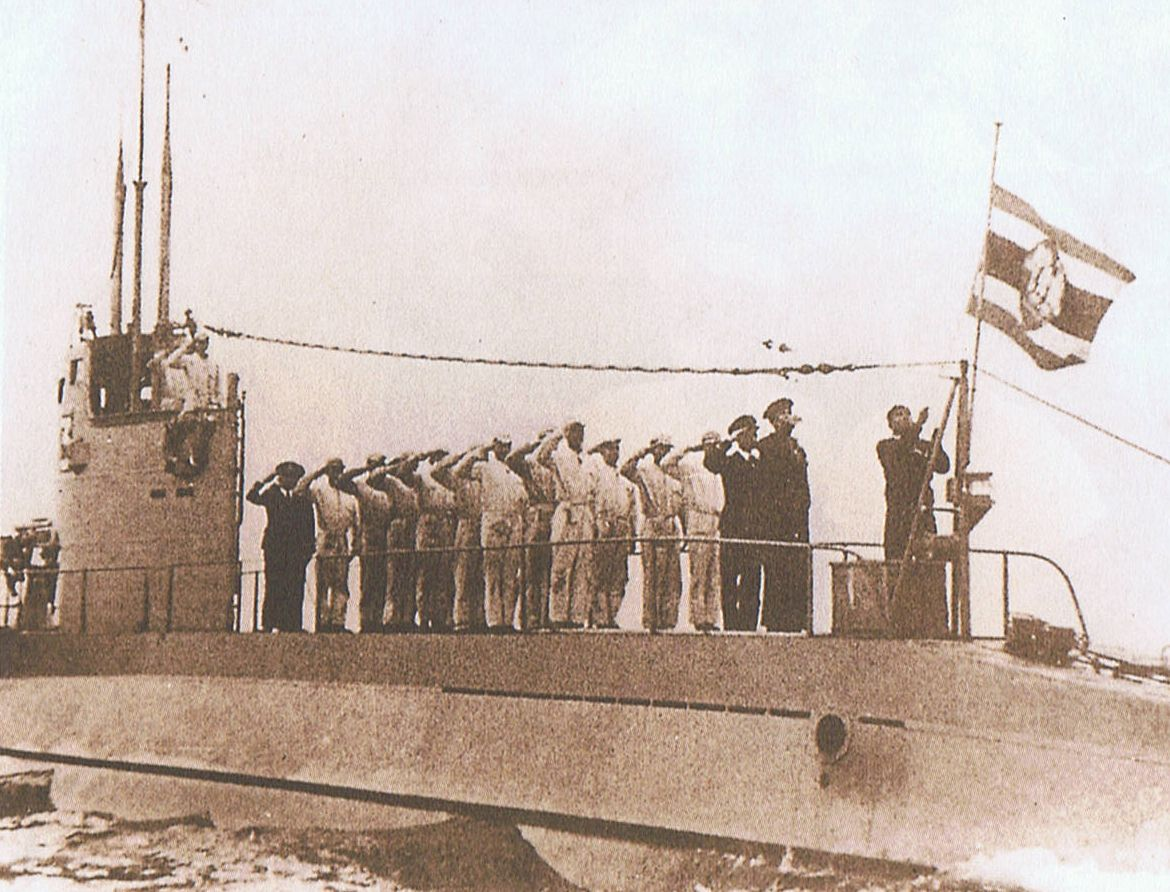
Pre-War photograph of HTMS Sinsamut, 1938.

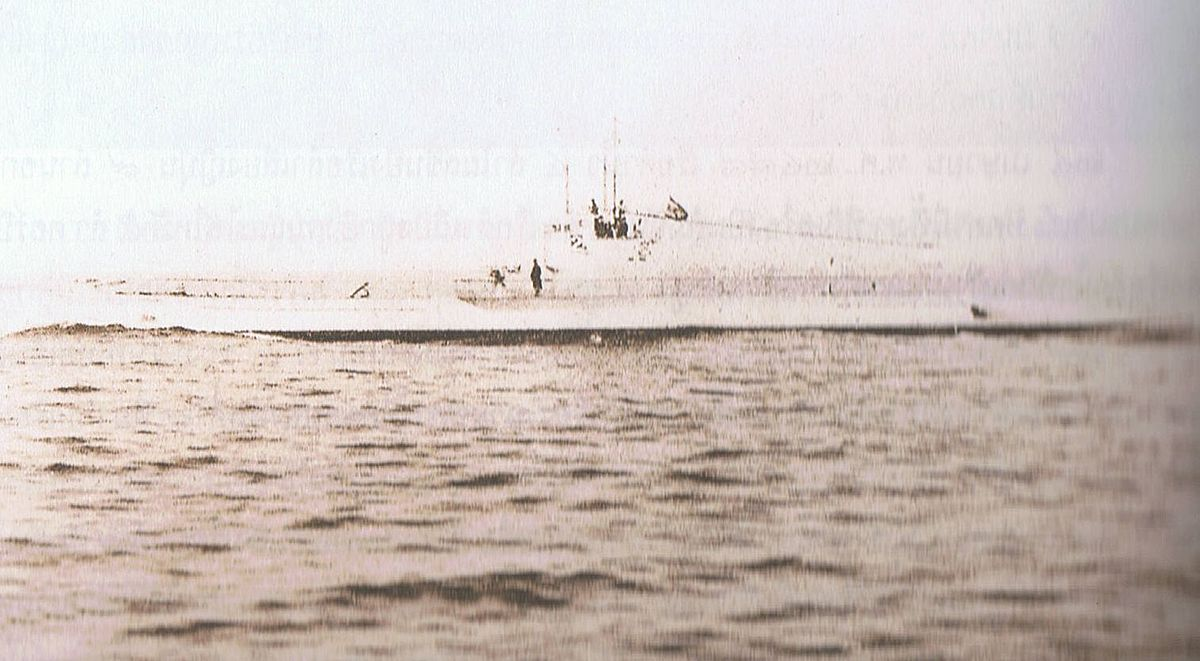
Pre-War photograph of HTMS Wirun, 1938.
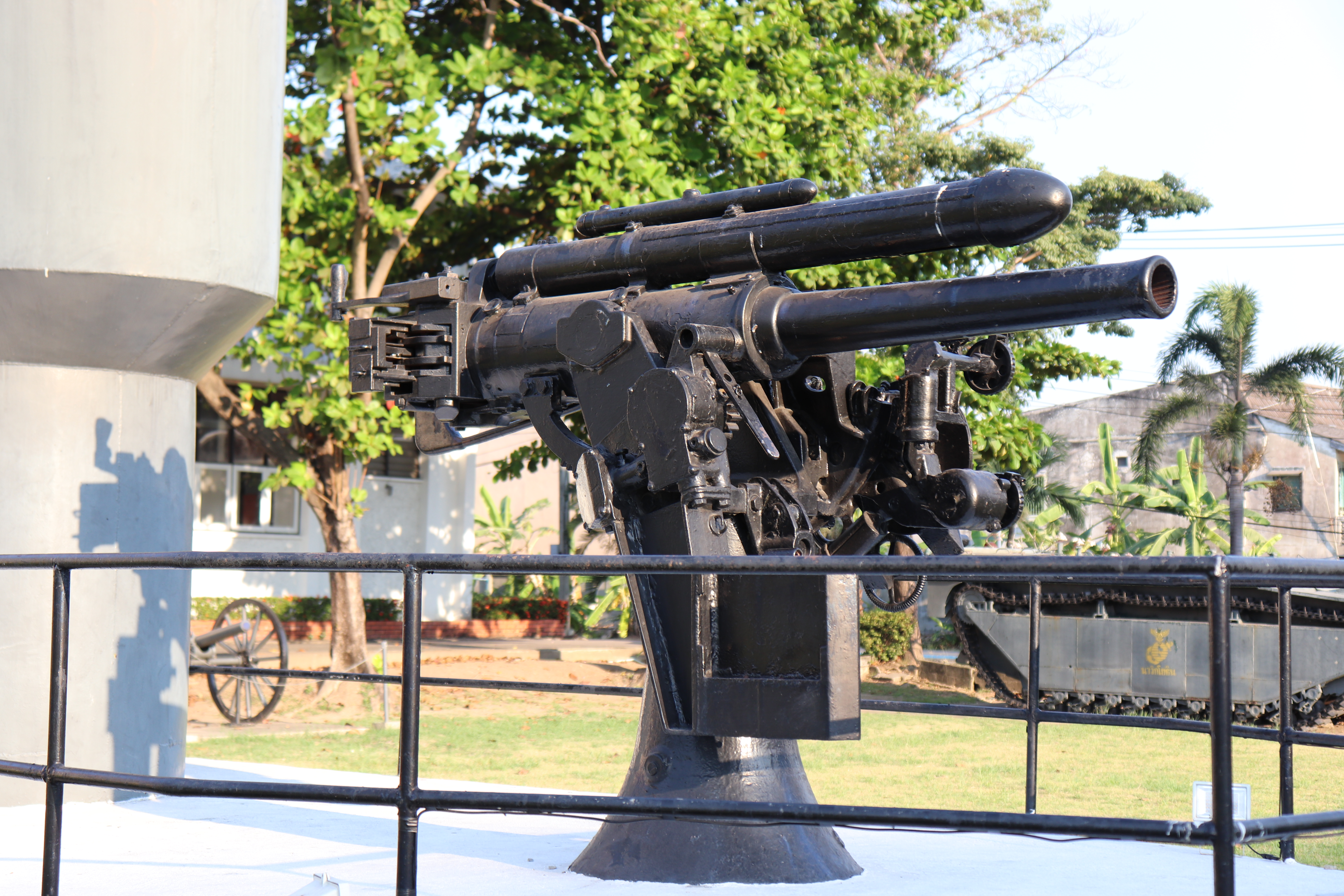
Preserved deck 76mm gun from HTMS Matchanu at Royal Thai Naval Academy, Samut Prakan.

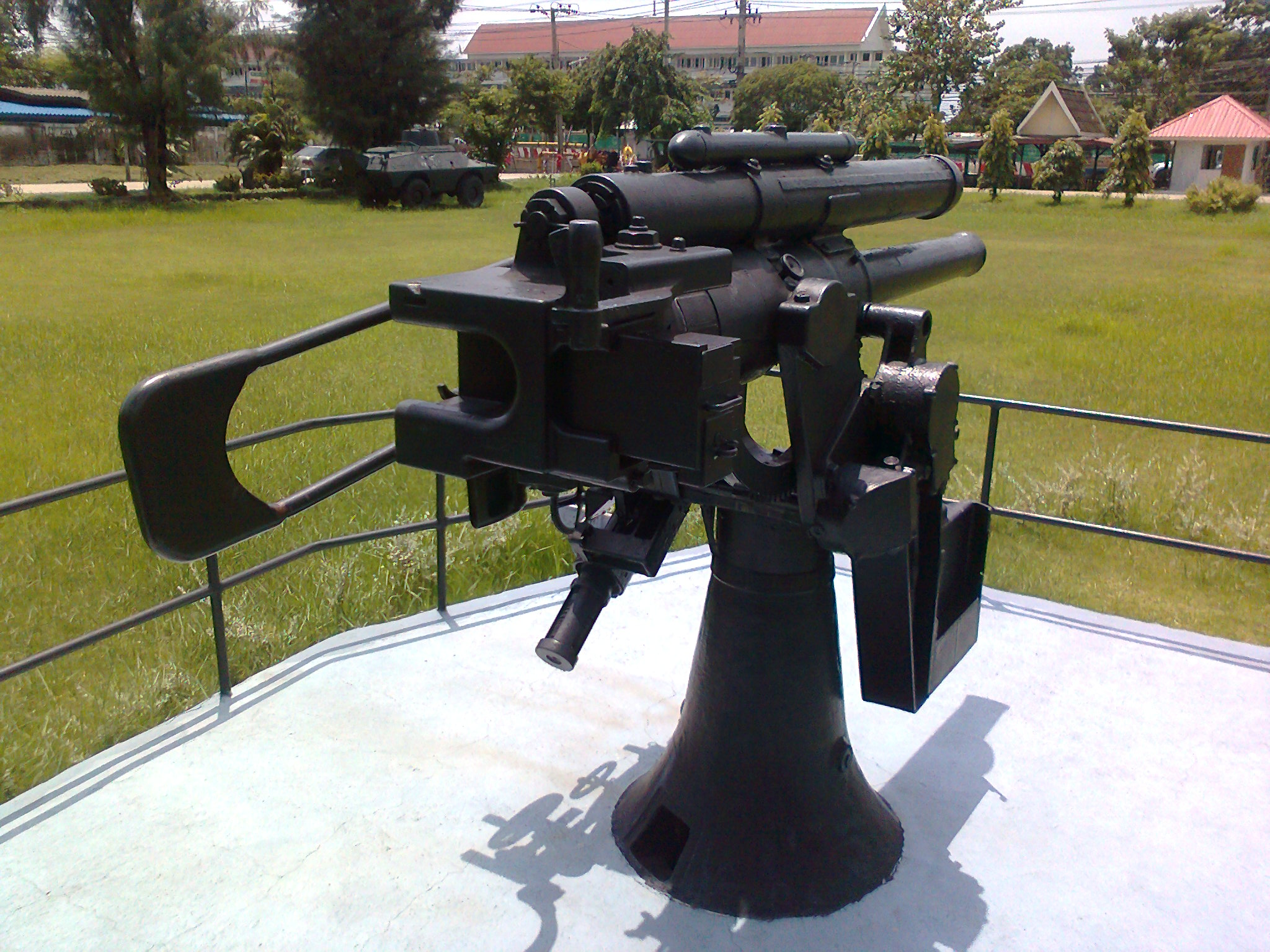
Rear view of Matchanu's 76mm deck gun.

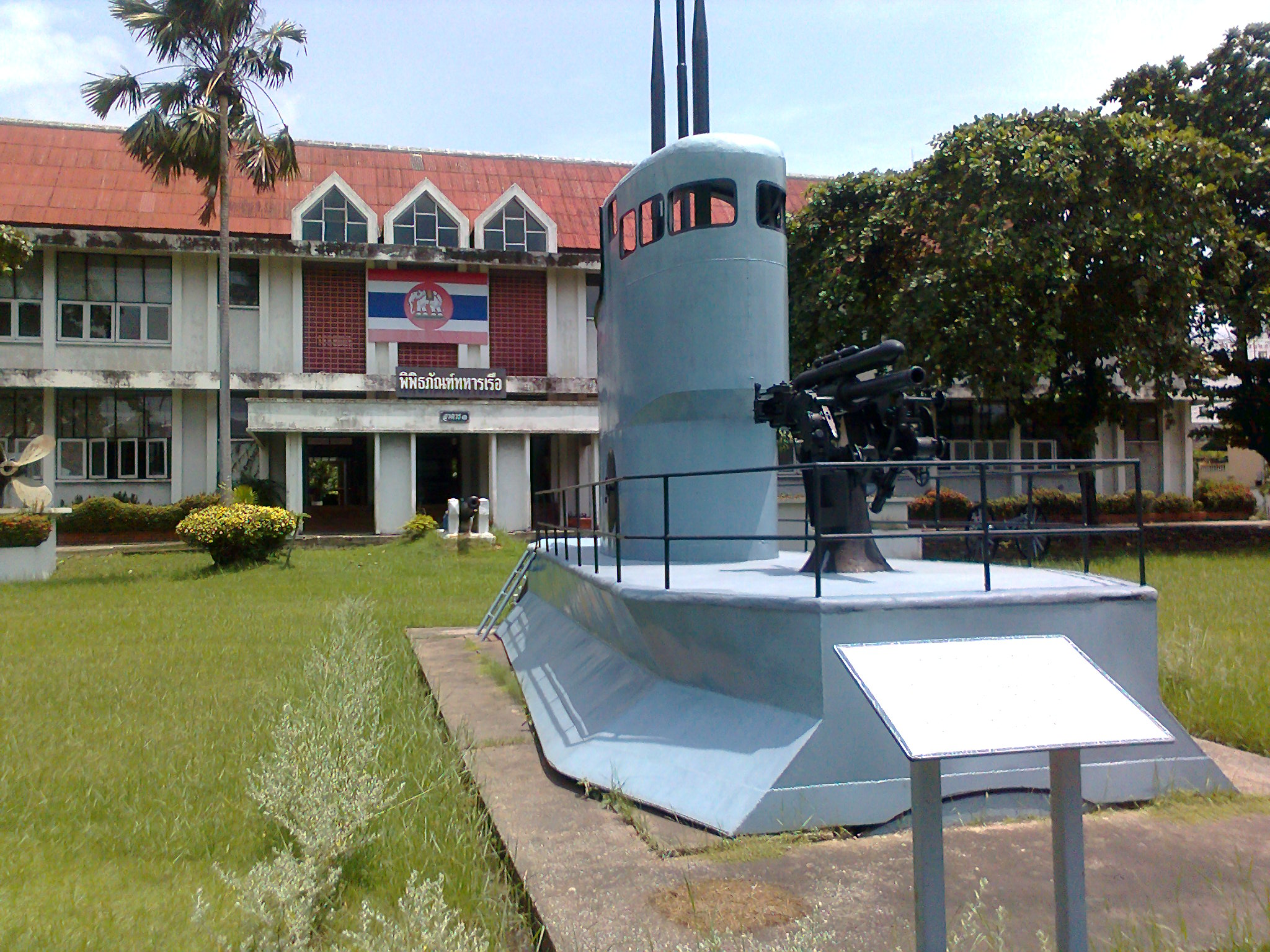
Preserved conning tower as a monument.

== See also ==
- Macchanu, the Ramakien character after whom the submarine and class are named
