= Thonburi-class coastal defence ship =

Warship class of the Royal Thai Navy

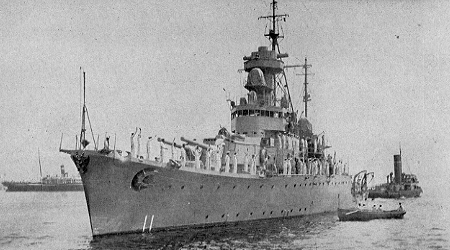
- HTMS Thonburi

Class overview
- Builders: Kawasaki Dockyard Co.
- Operators: Royal Thai Navy
- Preceded by: Ratanakosidra class
- Built: 1936–1938
- In commission: 1938-1951
- Completed: 2
- Lost: 2

General characteristics
- Type: Coastal defence ship
- Displacement: 2,265 long tons (2,301 t)
- Length: 76.50 m (251 ft 0 in)
- Beam: 14.43 m (47 ft 4 in)
- Draught: 4.17 m (13 ft 8 in)
- Propulsion: MAN diesels, 2 shafts; 3,900 kW (5,200 bhp)
- Speed: 15.5 kn (17.8 mph; 28.7 km/h)
- Complement: 155
- Armament: 4× 8 in (203 mm) guns (2 twin turrets); 4× 3 in (76 mm) anti-aircraft guns; 4× 40mm anti-aircraft guns
- Armour: Belt: 2 1/2 in (64 mm); Turrets:4 in (100 mm); Barbettes:4 in; Decks:1 1/2–1 in (38–25 mm)

The Thonburi class was a class of coastal defence ships of the Royal Thai Navy. It consisted of two ships built by Kawasaki and delivered in 1938, HTMS Thonburi and HTMS Sri Ayudhya.

== Design ==
Thonburi and her sister ship, Sri Ayudhya, were designed following the incorporation of the earlier Rattanakosindra-class gunboats into the Siamese Navy in the 1920s. The Ratanakosindra class were British-built ships which featured six-inch guns in two turrets and light armor. Under Plaek Pibulsonggram's command, the Siamese Navy began a series of modernization efforts. Priorities for the navy consisted of protecting the extensive Thai coastline, and coastal gunboats were viewed as the best resource. Several foreign firms from European countries offered a variety of designs, but in the end the Japanese company Kawasaki won the tender.

The new vessels were basically larger versions of the earlier Ratanakosindra ships. The ships were laid down at Kawasaki's facilities in 1936, and the first, Sri Ayuthia, was launched on 21 July 1937. The resulting "battleships," as they were referred to in Siam at the time, displaced 2,265 tons, featured increased armor protection (protecting machinery and gun turrets), and were powered by twin diesels produced by MAN of Germany.

=== Armament ===
Armament consisted of four 8-inch (203 mm)/50 calibre guns mounted in pairs in two turrets. The Japanese 8-inch rifles were of the same type as mounted in early Imperial Japanese Navy heavy cruisers and the aircraft carriers Akagi and Kaga. The main armament had a maximum range of 24,000 metres (26,000 yd) at 25 degrees of elevation. A tower above the bridge featured a gun director for aiming the main guns. Additional armament consisted of four 3-inch and four 40-mm guns.

=== Public opinion ===
The new ships were enthusiastically received by the Siamese Navy. Purchasing further vessels of the type was considered by the government, but ultimately it was decided to purchase two Italian-built Etna-class cruisers in 1938. Both ships were seized by Italy in 1941 before construction had finished, leaving Thonburi and her sister ship as the most powerful combatants in Siamese service.

== History ==
The first ship, Thonburi, and the second ship, Sri Ayudhya, were built in sequence at the Kobe Shipyard of Kawasaki Heavy Industries in Japan; both ships were commissioned in 1936, Sri Ayudhya was launched on July 31, 1937, and completed on June 16, 1938, while Thonburi was launched on 31 January 1938 and completed on 5 August of the same year. Thereafter, as the flagship of the Royal Thai Navy, Thonburi defended the seas of Thailand and continued to invite naval officers from other countries for exchanges.

On January 16, 1941, Thonburi engaged the French Navy in the Battle of Ko Chang, and was damaged and stranded. At the request of Thailand, Kawasaki Heavy Industries, Ltd. of Kobe was contracted to take her off the reef, and she was successfully raised by Japanese salvage workers at the end of 1941. However, the hull was severely damaged, and the ship remained in a moored condition for a long time after the war. Due to her advanced age, only the turret and bridge structure were later landed in the yard of the Naval Academy for preservation, and the rest was dismantled.

Sri Ayudhya was not damaged in the Battle of Ko Chang, and remained operational, but ran aground during the coup d'état in June 1951, and shortly thereafter was heavily damaged and sunk on June 30 by Thai Army shelling, and was later floated and dismantled.

== Ships in class ==
Ship name	Commissioned	Decommissioned	Struck	Fate
Thonburi	31 January 1938	26 September 1941	19 June 1959	Severely damaged in the Battle of Koh Chang, 17 January 1941; Refitted and became training ship until being struck.
Sri Ayudhya	19 July 1938	n/a	8 October 1959	Sunk during the Manhattan Rebellion, 1 July 1951.
