= Thon Buri (disambiguation) =

Thonburi is a former capital of Siam (now Thailand) and now a part of Bangkok. The name may also refer to:

== Thonburi Dynasty ==
- King of Thonburi, an alternative name for King Taksin, who reigned during the period

== Governance ==
- Thon Buri District, a district in Bangkok comprising part of the former city of Thon Buri
- Thonburi Kingdom, the period in Thai history during which Thonburi was capital

== Transportation ==
- Thon Buri railway station
- Krung Thon Buri BTS station
- Krung Thon Bridge

== University ==
- Thonburi University
- Bangkokthonburi University
- King Mongkut's University of Technology Thonburi

== Other ==
- Thonburi Palace
- HTMS Thonburi
- Thonburi Hospital
- Thonburi Market
- Krung Thonburi F.C.

== See also ==
- Dhanpur (disambiguation)
- Dhanpuri, a city in Madhya Pradesh, India
