= Dhanpur =

Dhanpur may refer to the following places in India:

- Dhanpur, Himachal Pradesh
- Dhanpur, Gujarat, a taluka in Dahod district
- Dhanpur (Vidhan Sabha constituency), Tripura
- Dhanpur, Moulvibazar, a village in the Akhailkura Union.

== See also ==
- Dhanpuri, city in Madhya Pradesh, India
- Thonburi (disambiguation)
