= HTMS Thonburi =

Thai coastal defence ship (1938–1941)

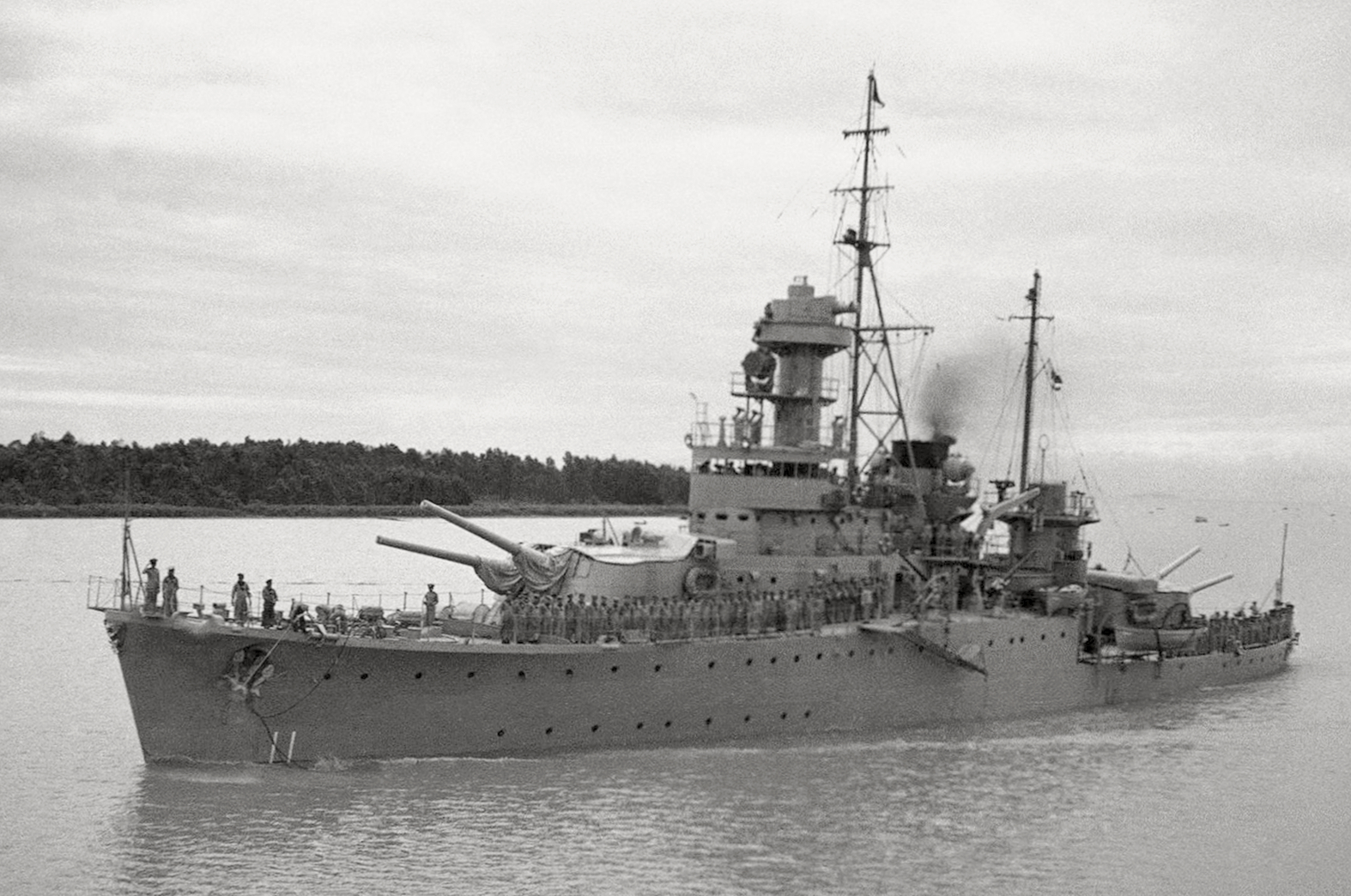
- HTMS Thonburi in 1938

History

Siam/Thailand
- Name: HTMS Thonburi
- Namesake: Kingdom of Thonburi
- Awarded: Bravery Medal
- Builder: Kawasaki, Kobe, Japan
- Laid down: 12 January 1936
- Launched: 31 July 1937
- Commissioned: 31 January 1938
- Decommissioned: 26 September 1941
- Stricken: 19 June 1959
- Fate: Wrecked in the Battle of Koh Chang on 17 January 1941, refitted in Japan, decommissioned and used as a training vessel until being stricken.
- Status: Currently a memorial site (deck and front turret) at the Royal Thai Naval Academy, Samut Prakan

General characteristics
- Class & type: Thonburi-class coastal defence ship
- Displacement: 2,265 tons
- Length: 252.66 ft (77.01 m)
- Beam: 47.25 ft (14.40 m)
- Draft: 13.75 ft (4.19 m)
- Propulsion: 2 MAN diesel engines; 5,200 shp
- Speed: 15.5 knots
- Complement: 234 officers and men
- Armament: 4 x 8 in (203 mm) guns, 4 × 3 in (76 mm) anti-aircraft guns; Before World War II: 4 × 20 mm AA Madsen; During World War II: 4 × 40 mm AA Vickers
- Armor: Main belt: 63.5 mm (2.5 in); Deck: 38 + 25 mm (1.5 + 1.0 in); Turrets: 102 mm (4 in); Conning Tower: 102 mm (4 in)

HTMS Thonburi (Thai: เรือหลวงธนบุรี, RTGS: Thon buri) was a coastal defence ship of the Royal Thai Navy that participated in the Battle of Ko Chang during Franco-Thai War. Thonburi was in service from 1938 to 1959, first as a gunboat and later as a stationary floating headquarters for the coastal patrol squadron after recovered from damages received during the Battle of Ko Chang. Currently the superstructure and her gun turret is preserved as a monument at the Royal Thai Naval Academy at Samut Prakan.

== Design ==
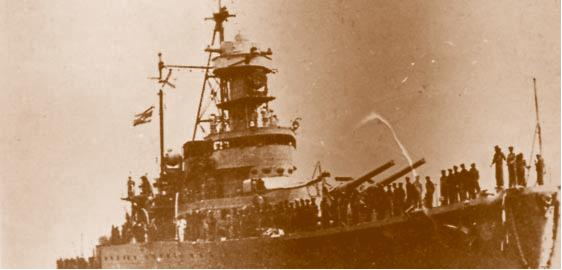
HTMS Thonburi 4 days before fight, in January 1941

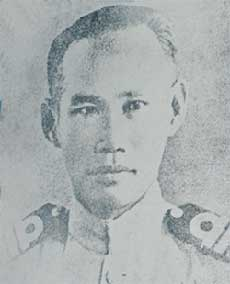
Commander Luang Phrom Viraphan †, Captain of HTMS Thonburi during the Battle of Ko Chang.

Thonburi and her sister ship, HTMS Sri Ayudhya, were designed following the incorporation of the earlier Rattanakosindra-class gunboats into the Siamese Navy in the 1920s. The Rattanakosindra class were British-built ships which featured six-inch guns in two turrets and light armor. Under Plaek Phibunsongkram's command, the Siamese Navy began a series of modernization efforts. Priorities for the navy consisted of protecting the extensive Thai coastline, and coastal gunboats were viewed as the best resource. Several foreign firms from European countries offered a variety of designs, but in the end the Japanese company Kawasaki won the tender.

The new vessels were basically larger versions of the earlier Rattanakosindra ships. The ships were laid down at Kawasaki's facilities in 1936, and Thonburi was launched on 31 July 1937. The resulting "battleships", as they were referred to in Siam at the time, displaced 2,265 tons, featured increased armor protection (protecting machinery and gun turrets), and were powered by twin diesels produced by MAN of Germany.

Armament consisted of four 8-inch (203 mm)/50 calibre guns mounted in two twin turrets. The Japanese 8-inch guns were of the same type as in early Imperial Japanese Navy heavy cruisers and the aircraft carriers Akagi and Kaga. In fact, they were second hand guns left over from Japanese modernization efforts. It is unknown which ships the guns came from, but the carrier Kaga is a possible donor. The main armament had a maximum range of 24,000 metres (26,000 yd) at 25 degrees of elevation. A tower above the bridge featured a fire control tower with a gun director sitting on top to direct the guns. Additional armament consisted of four 3-inch and four 40-mm guns.

The new ships were enthusiastically received by the Royal Thai Navy. Purchasing further vessels of the type was considered by the government, but ultimately it was decided to purchase two Italian-built light cruisers in 1938. Both ships were seized by Italy in 1941 before construction had finished (they were never completed), leaving Thonburi and Sri Ayudhya as the most powerful combatants in Thai service.

== Service ==
Both ships of the class had entered service by the time hostilities had broken out in Europe during the Second World War. Thonburi engaged a French squadron in the Battle of Koh Chang on 17 January 1941. The resulting battle was nothing short of a massive defeat, as the Thai ship was severely damaged by fire from the French cruiser Lamotte-Picquet, fires spread out of control and other ships were unable to connect to her fire suppression systems due to not having adaptors for the differently sized pipes so she was towed to Laem Ngop to be beached in order to prevent her sinking. She would capsize a few hours after the order to abandon ship was given. Thonburi was later raised and attempts were made to repair the extensive damage, though she would never sail under her own power again. She would continue to serve the navy as a training vessel with her secondary battery being removed until being stricken in 1959. Part of her bridge and forward gun turret are preserved as a memorial at the Royal Thai Naval Academy with other relics from her such as the remains of her bow garuda and bell would be spread around the country in various museums. Interestingly, there are two bells on display at two different museums which claim to be the real bell of the Thonburi. Which one is the genuine article or if she ever had two bells are unclear. Sri Ayudhya had a more unfortunate fate, being sunk in the Manhattan Rebellion of 1951.

== Awards ==

Bravery Medal (เหรียญกล้าหาญ) (1942)

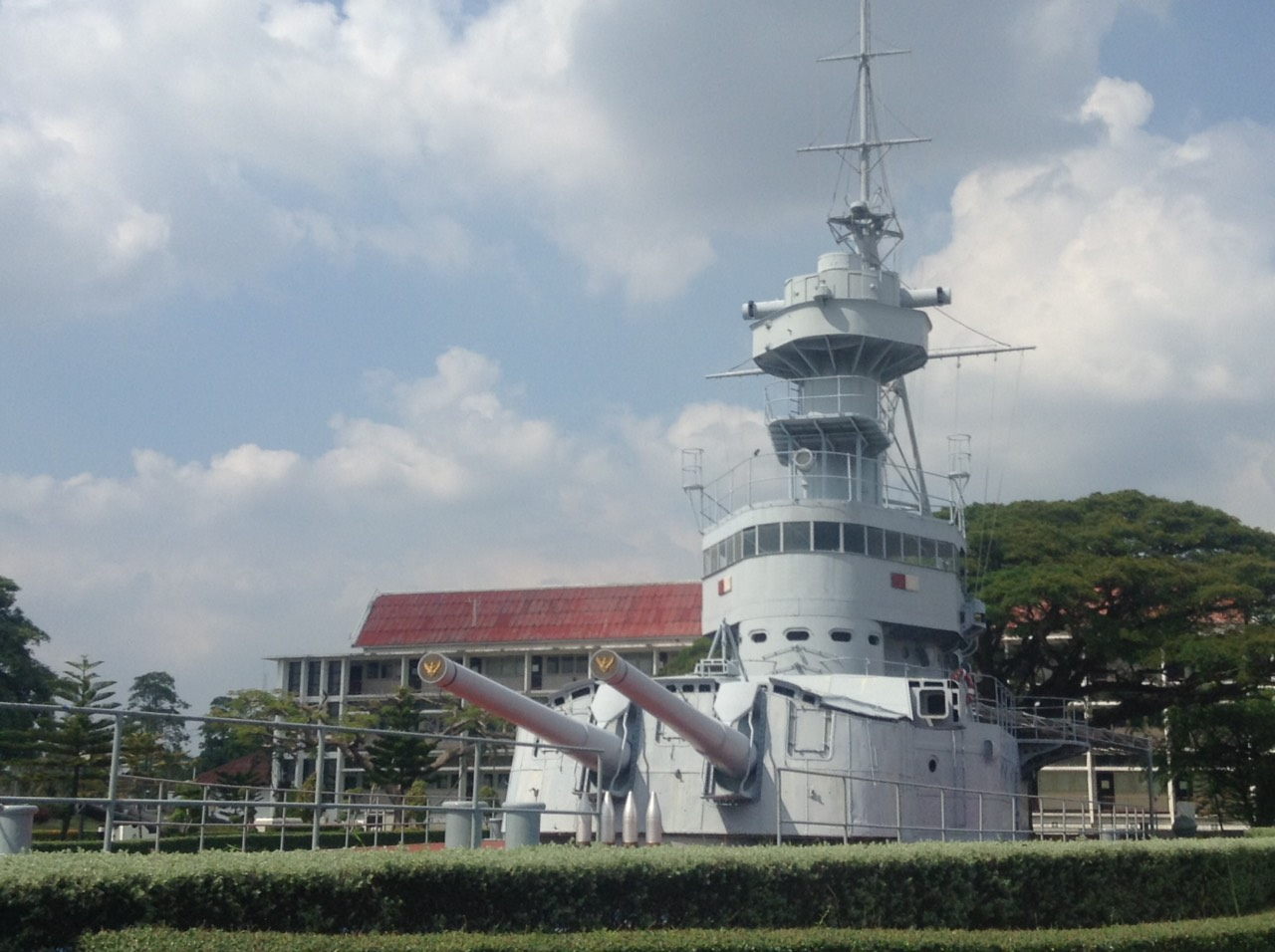
The HTMS Thonburi memorial in the Royal Thai Naval Academy, Samut Prakan.

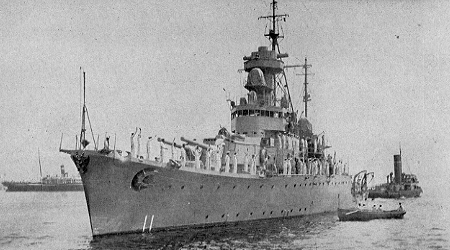
HTMS Thonburi at Yokohama, 12 September 1938

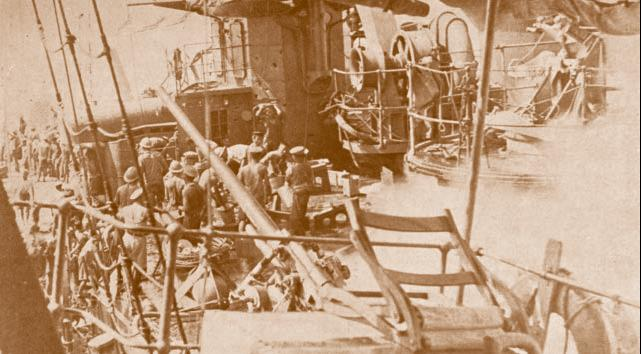
Damage control and fire extinguishing aboard Thonburi, January 1941.

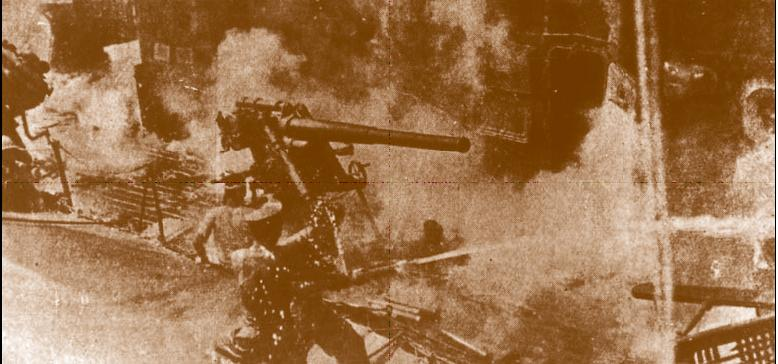
Firefighting aboard Thonburi taken from HTMS Chang (เรือหลวงช้าง) during attempts to save Thonburi, January 1941.
