= Dhanpur, Himachal Pradesh =

Dhanpur
- village
- Location in Himachal Pradesh, India Dhanpur (India)
- Coordinates: 31.770432615°N 76.4108232031°E
- Country: India
- State: Himachal Pradesh

Government
  - Body: pyanchyati raj
- Elevation: 650 m (2,130 ft)

Population (2001)
  - Total: 50

Society
  - Languages: Hindi, Pahari
- Time zone: UTC+5:30 (IST)
- Postal code: 177044
- Vehicle registration: HP-55

Dhanpur is a very small village near Nadaun, Himachal Pradesh, northern India, with a population of around 50 people. It is located on the top of a small hill. The village has a historical temple, and there is evidence of some sort of fort or palace in the area. The location of village is good and it has a pleasant climate.

== Historical Importance ==
The importance of this village lies in it having evidence of an historical palace or fort.

The village is attempting to get India's Archaeological Department to have a look. The villagers found one buried sword near the temple while doing renovation work. The sword was sent to a museum, but still there is no progress in the way of revealing the history of village. While the Public Health department was working for digging water tank, a number of items were found - a small clay artefact, iron to make the small artifact and ash about 16 feet (5m) underground.

Today anyone can have a look at the lime-made remains of the boundary wall and other some remains of the underground palace. The village has the Krishi Vigyan Kendra for Hamirpur district located here helping the local economy to improve by adoption of modern methodologies in farm sector

== Geography ==
Dhanpur has an average elevation of 650 metres (2,150 feet).

The average rainfall is 1599.6 mm (63") The village has its nearest river Beas at Pataji Village viewed from Dhanpur heights.

== How to reach ==
25 km (16 mi) from Hamirpur. 9 km (5.6 mi) from Nadaun. 24 km (15 mi) from Sujanpur. The nearest airport is Gagal (Kangra/Dharmshala). The nearest railway stations are Chururu-Takarla for broad gauge connection to Nangal and Ranitaal for the narrow gauge connection to Pathankot. There are direct busses from Delhi/Chandigarh/Shimla and other major towns in Punjab, Haryana and Himachal. It is connected by a good single lane motorable road from Maloti on the Nadaun-Sujanpur road and can also be reached from Hamirpur by taking the fork off Rangas via Rail and Bara to Maloti. There is a walkable elevated old route upwards via Dhamandad from Bara Village on Sujanpur Route.
