= HTMS Sri Ayudhya =

1937 Thonburi-class coastal defence ship

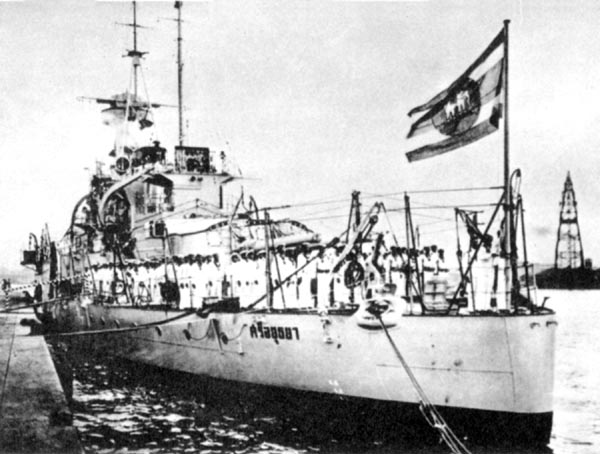
- Port-stern view of HTMS Sri Ayudhya

History

Thailand
- Name: HTMS Sri Ayudhya
- Namesake: Kingdom of Ayutthaya
- Builder: Kawasaki, Kobe, Japan
- Laid down: 1936
- Launched: 31 July 1937
- Acquired: 16 June 1938
- Commissioned: 19 July 1938
- Stricken: 8 October 1959
- Fate: Sank on 1 July 1951 during the Manhattan Rebellion

General characteristics
- Class & type: Thonburi-class coastal defence ship
- Displacement: 2,350 metric tons
- Length: 77 m (253 ft)
- Beam: 13.41 m (44.0 ft)
- Draft: 4.2 m (14 ft)
- Propulsion: 2 MAN Diesels; 5,200 shp
- Speed: 15.8 knots (29.3 km/h; 18.2 mph) (maximum); 12.2 knots (22.6 km/h; 14.0 mph) (economical)
- Range: 6,493 nautical miles (12,025 km; 7,472 mi) (maximum speed); 11,100 nautical miles (20,600 km; 12,800 mi) (economical speed)
- Complement: 234
- Armament: 4 × 8 in (203 mm) guns (2 Type D twin turrets); 4 × 3 in (76 mm) anti-aircraft guns; 4 × 40 mm Type-BI anti-aircraft guns; 4 × 20 mm Madsen anti-aircraft guns
- Armor: Main belt: 2.5 in (63.5 mm); Deck: 1 in (25 mm); Turrets: 4 in (102 mm)

HTMS Sri Ayudhya (Note: His Thai Majesty's Ship; see Ship prefix for details.) (Thai: เรือหลวงศรีอยุธยา, RTGS: Si Ayutthaya) was a coastal defence ship of the Royal Thai Navy. It was in service from 1938 to 1951, being active during the Franco-Thai War in which its sister ship HTMS Thonburi was heavily damaged in the Battle of Ko Chang. Sri Ayudhya later served as flagship of the navy until it was sunk as a result of fighting in the Manhattan Rebellion.

== Construction and career ==
In the 1930s the Royal Siamese Navy pursued plans to upgrade and expand its limited forces. This was approved by parliament in 1935, and 18 million baht was allocated for the procurement of new equipment. In December 1935, the navy contracted the Japanese Kawasaki Shipbuilding Corporation of Kobe to build two coastal defence ships for 5.727 million baht. Sri Ayudhya was delivered on 16 June 1938 and commissioned on 19 July; its sister ship Thonburi followed in October that year.

HTMS Sri Ayudhya crew group photo, 1938. (The life buoy in the middle reads HTMS Sri Ayudhya - ร.ล.ศรีอยุธยา)

When the Franco-Thai War broke out in late 1940, the navy assigned Sri Ayudhya and Thonburi to the First Squadron, tasked with patrolling the eastern waters against potential French attacks. On the night of 14 January, the group led by Thonburi set sail from Sattahip Naval Base to relieve Sri Ayudhya and its convoy, which had been stationed at the island of Ko Chang in Trat Province. They rendezvoused the following morning, and the Sri Ayudhya group returned to Sattahip. Two days later, at dawn on 17 January, Thonburi and other ships in the group were engaged by French naval forces in what became the Battle of Ko Chang. Sri Ayudhya was sent to assist in the battle, but only arrived in the afternoon after hostilities had ceased. However, some French reports erroneously noted that Sri Ayudhya was damaged by a torpedo during the battle.

After the Battle of Ko Chang, Royal Thai Navy commander Rear Admiral Luang Sinthusongkhramchai have planned an attack on Hà Tiên as retaliation. The operation involved two squadrons of ships comprising six Trad-Class Torpedo Boats acting as minelayers, sloops Maeklong and Tachin as escorts with Sri Ayudhya as shore gunnery decoy and staging ground for Royal Thai Marines raiding parties who would disembarks when Sri Ayudhya docks at Hà Tiên's docks area after shore bombardments. The mission is being carried out on 26 January 1941. However, the ceasefire negotiations between Thailand and French Indochina with Japanese mediation ended the Franco-Thai War and the attack operation is never carried out by HTMS Sri Ayudhya.

Sri Ayudhya did not see action after World War II, although it became regarded as the flagship of the navy. It served as a royal transport vessel for Kings Ananda Mahidol and Bhumibol Adulyadej during the final legs of their respective return trips from Switzerland in 1938 and 1950.

== Manhattan Rebellion ==
The heavily damaged Sri Ayudhya listing before it sank on 1 July 1951

On 29 June 1951, in a coup attempt known as the Manhattan Rebellion, a group of junior naval officers held Prime Minister Plaek Pibulsonggram (Phibun) at gunpoint during a boat-transfer ceremony at Ratchaworadit Pier on the Chao Phraya River in Bangkok. Phibun was taken aboard the Sri Ayudhya and held hostage. General stations were called, and the ship began to make way downstream towards the Naval Ordnance Department in Bang Na. However, the coup plotters failed to secure the opening of the Memorial Bridge, and the ship thus could not continue. Fighting quickly ensued, and the naval units that sided with the rebels became heavily outnumbered by the army, police and air forces, who were loyal to the government. Fighting subsided during the night but resumed and intensified early the next morning. Sri Ayudhya joined the fight, but its engines were soon disabled and the ship became dead in the water in front of Wichaiprasit Fort. It was heavily fired upon from the eastern bank by guns and mortars, and, by afternoon, was also bombarded by AT-6 trainer planes. Heavy fires broke out, and the order was given to abandon ship. Phibun had to swim ashore along with the sailors, but was uninjured. The fires continued throughout the night and into the next day, when fighting ceased. The heavily damaged Sri Ayudhya finally sank in the night of 1 July.

The wreck of Sri Ayudhya was later salvaged for scrap, as it had become a navigational hazard. The ship was officially struck from the naval register on 8 October 1959 in Ministerial Order 350/21315.

== Gallery ==
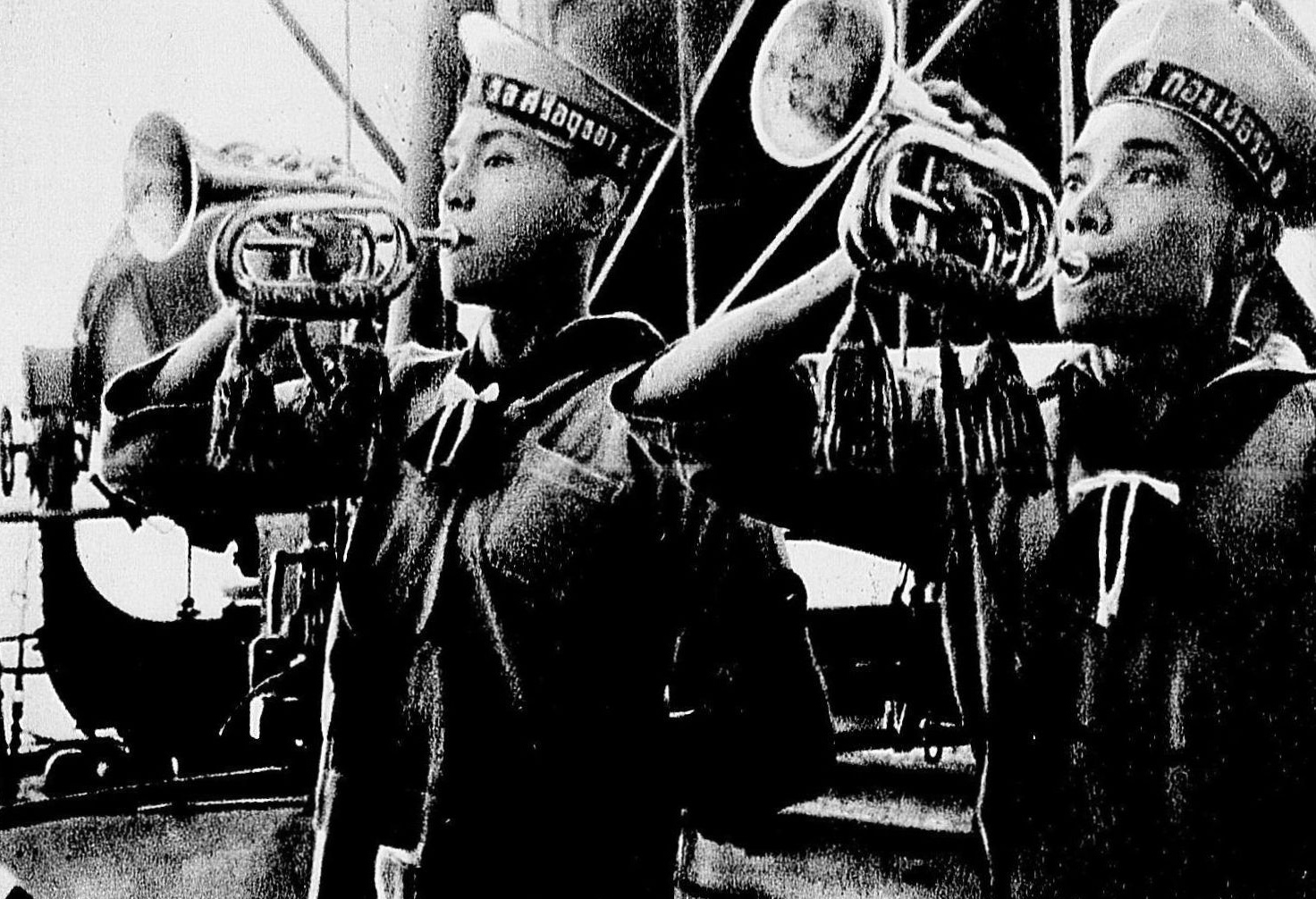
Thai sailors performing a bugle call on the deck of HTMS Sri Ayudhya, 1 April 1943. (Djawa Baroe)

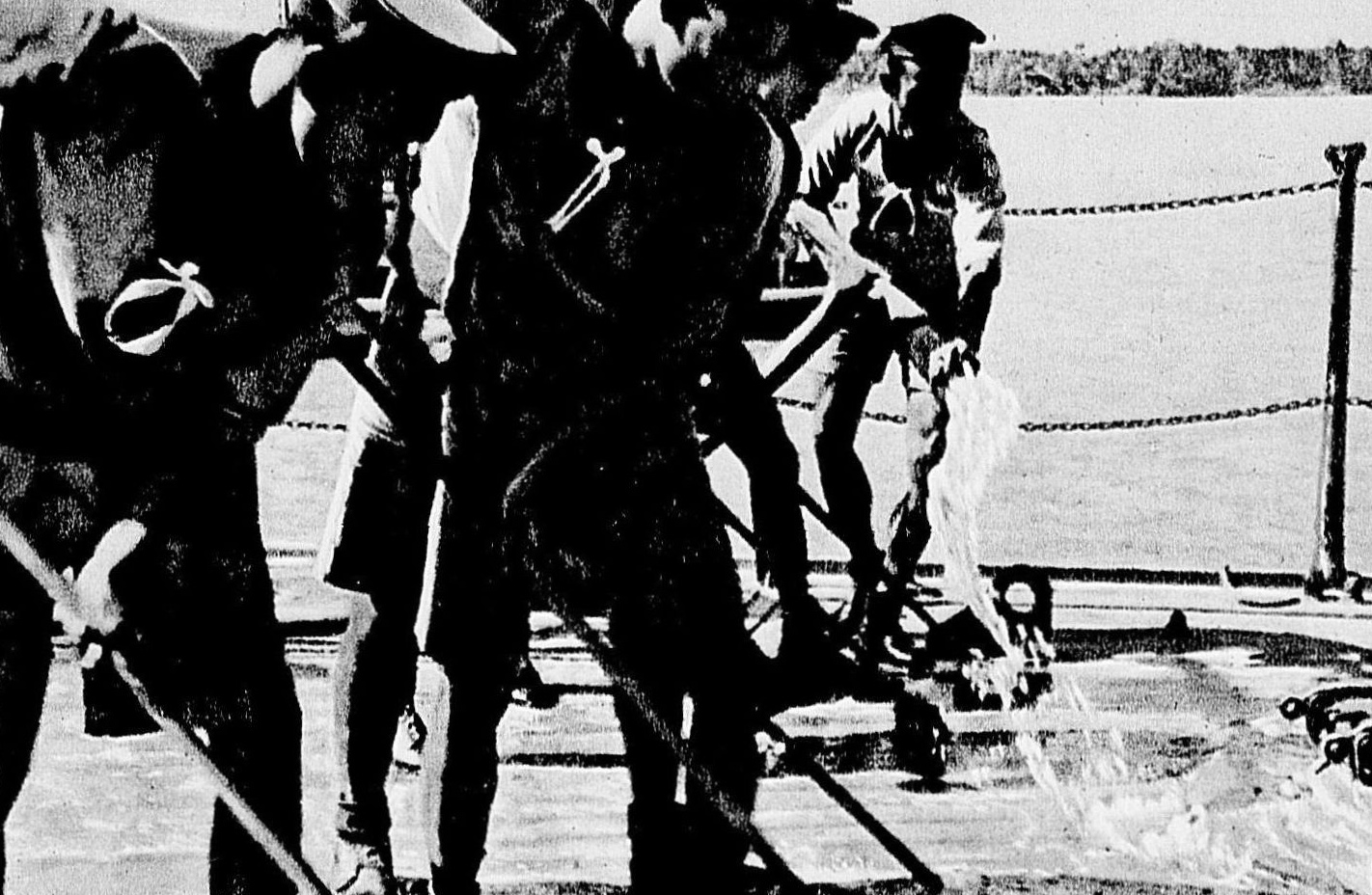
Thai sailors washing the deck of Sri Ayudhya, 1 April 1943. (Djawa Baroe)

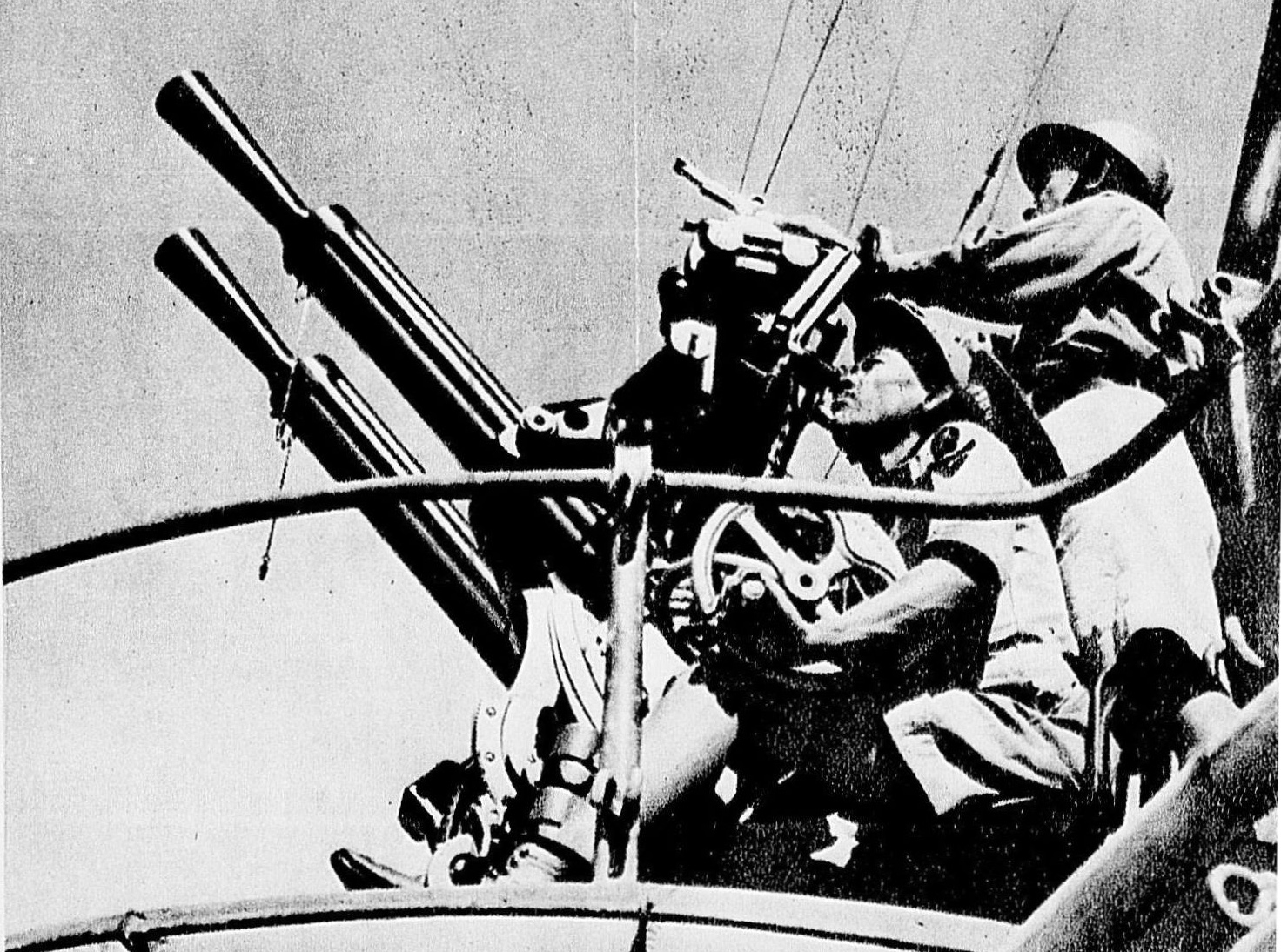
Sri Ayudhya's sailors manning her Japanese 40mm "Type-Bi" Vickers Pom-Pom, 1 April 1943. (Djawa Baroe)

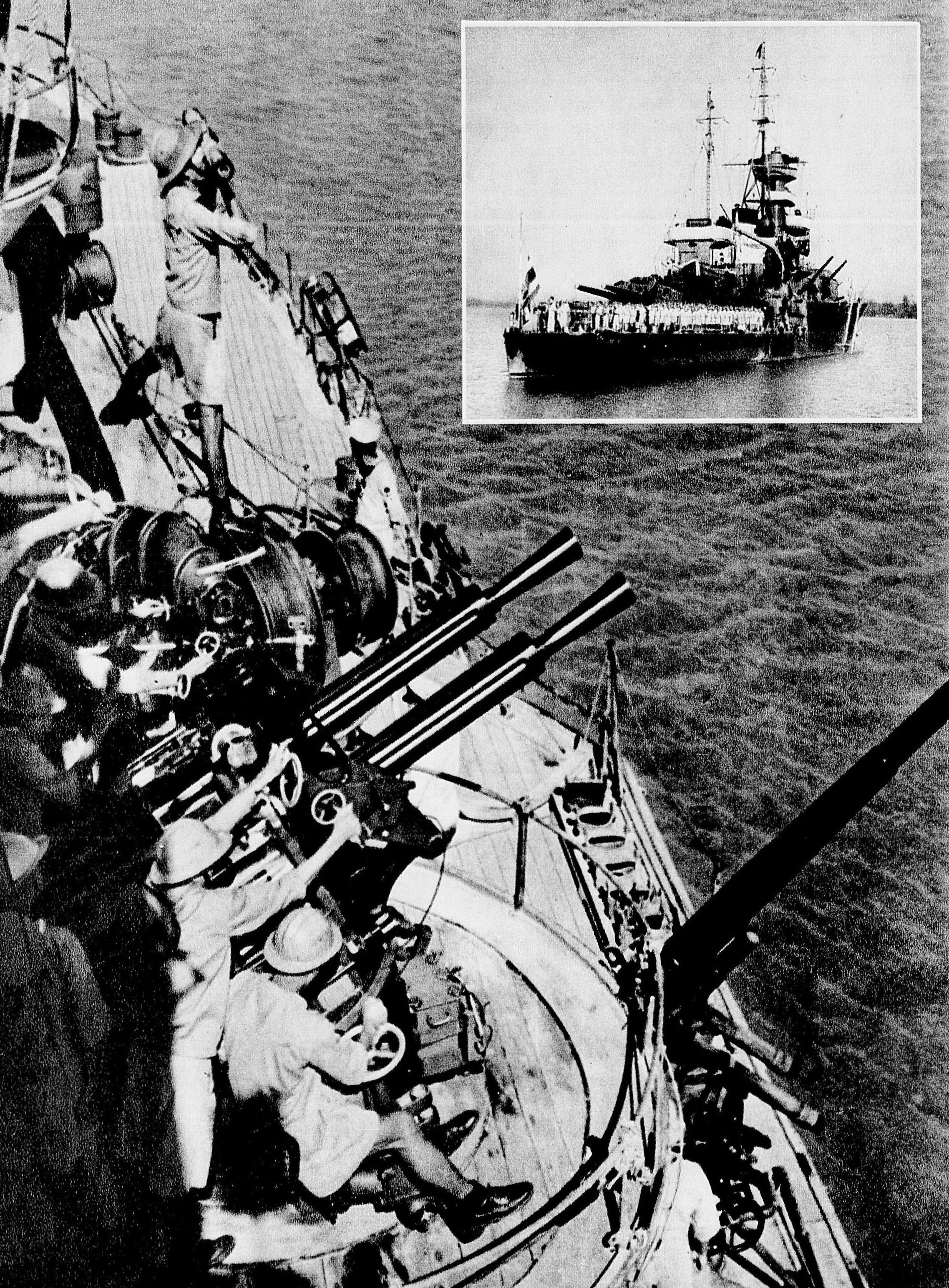
Another image of Sri Ayudhya's sailors manning her Japanese 40mm "Type-Bi" Vickers Pom-Pom, 1 April 1943. (Djawa Baroe)
