= Battle of Ko Chang =

1941 battle of the Franco-Thai War during the Second World War

Coordinates: 12°00′04″N 102°27′04″E

- Part of the Franco-Thai War of World War II
- A map of the Battle of Ko Chang
Date	17 January 1941
Location	Gulf of Thailand
Result	French victory

Belligerents
Vichy France: French Indochina	Thailand

Commanders and leaders
Régis Bérenger	Luang P. Viraphan †

Strength
1 light cruiser 4 avisos 9 aircraft 950 men	2 coastal defence ship 2 avisos

Casualties and losses
11 killed	36 killed (Thai figures); 2 torpedo boats sunk 1 coastal defence ship grounded (Note: HTMS Thonburi later capsized due to battle damage before being refloated and repaired.) limited damage to shore facilities

The Battle of Ko Chang took place on 17 January 1941 during the Franco-Thai War. A flotilla of French warships attacked a smaller force of Thai vessels, including a coastal defence ship. The battle resulted in a tactical victory by the French Navy over the Royal Thai Navy, although the strategic result is dubious. Two Thai ships were sunk and one was heavily damaged, with no French losses. The battle prompted Japan to intervene diplomatically and mediate a ceasefire, which left Thailand in control of the contested areas of French Indochina. Within a month of the engagement, Vichy France and Thailand negotiated a peace that ended the war.

== Background ==
=== Situation ===
The Franco-Thai War was going quite poorly for the French land forces. The French Governor General of Indochina and Commander-in-Chief Naval Forces, Admiral Jean Decoux, decided Indochina's best chance at stopping the incursions would be to attempt a naval attack on the Thailand's fleet and coastal cities. This would clear the way for bombardment missions to support a counter-offensive along the Cambodian frontier.

=== Royal Thai Navy ===
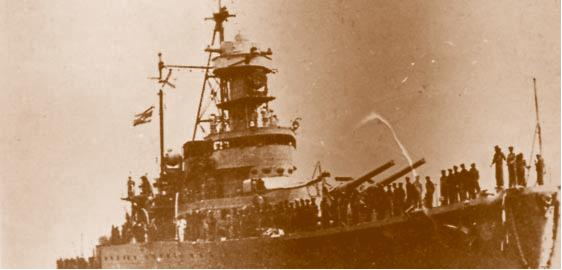
HTMS Thonburi

Although comparatively small, the Royal Thai Navy had been modernized with the recent acquisition of vessels from both Japan and Italy. The Thai fleet was centered on two Japanese-built armored coast defence vessels—HTMS Thonburi and Sri Ayudhya—which displaced 2,500 long tons (2,540 t) and carried four 8-inch (203 mm) guns in two twin-gun turrets. These ships had been built in the late 1930s. It also included two older Rattanakosindra-class gunboats with a pair of 6-inch (152 mm) guns apiece, which had been built in Britain in the mid-1920s. The fleet also had twelve torpedo boats and four submarines.

In addition, the Royal Thai Air Force had on its rosters over 140 aircraft, including relatively modern Mitsubishi Ki-30 (Allied reporting name "Ann") light bombers, which saw extensive service against the French during the war. These aircraft were quite capable of disrupting any French naval operation which might be mounted. Other less capable aircraft in the Thai inventory included P-36 Hawk fighters, 70 Chance-Vought O2U-2 Corsair biplanes, six Martin B-10 bombers, and several Avro 504 trainers.

=== French Navy ===
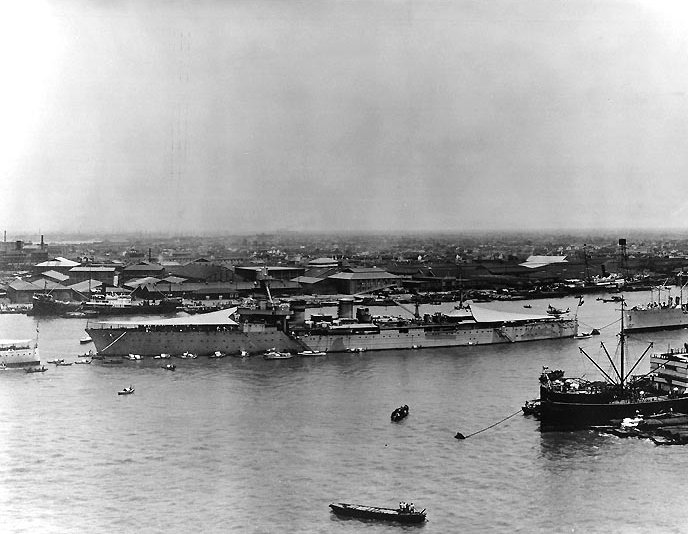
Lamotte-Piquet

Admiral Jean Decoux formed a small squadron called the Groupe Occasionnel (ad hoc group) on 9 December 1940 at Cam Ranh Bay, north of Saigon. In command he placed Capitaine de Vaisseau Régis Bérenger.

The squadron consisted of:

- the light cruiser Lamotte-Picquet: a light cruiser built in 1923. The ship was fast but poorly armored.
- the modern avisos Dumont d'Urville and Amiral Charner. Those ships were specially designed for colonial service and could embark a company of infantry. They were very lightly armed and without armor.
- the older avisos Tahure and Marne.

There was no air cover, but nine Loire 130 seaplanes based at Ream provided reconnaissance. Additional scouting was done by three coastal survey crafts, and intelligence gleaned from local fishermen.

=== Plan of attack ===
Bérenger's squadron began training manoeuvres in Cam Ranh Bay shortly after assembling. On 13 January 1941, Admiral Decoux formally requested that Bérenger lead the squadron against the Thai Navy to support a land offensive planned for 16 January. The land action was meant to force back the Thai ground forces that had been advancing along the coast. Because of the disparate speeds of the French ships, Bérenger sent the slower ships ahead, while he remained in Saigon to complete the final elements of the plan.

Several options were being prepared, the Admiralty in France having given its approval to use naval forces to support the army. The final planning meeting on 13 January saw an immediate delay in the execution for 24 hours. Once the plans were completed, Bérenger sailed in Lamotte-Picquet. The delay in starting the operation allowed him to refuel at Cape St. Jacques before his rendezvous with the slower ships at 16:00 on 15 January, 20 mi (17 nmi; 32 km) north of Poulo Condore.

Admiral Decoux's orders were simple: "Attack the Siamese coastal cities from Rayong to the Cambodian frontier to force the Siamese government to withdraw its forces from the Cambodian frontier". On the evening of 15 January, following a last conference on board the flagship, the squadron weighed anchor at 21:15 and closed on the Thai coast at 14 knots (16 mph; 26 km/h), the top speed of the sloops. The French ships remained undetected as they entered the Gulf of Siam, but their quarry was not as fortunate. The Loire 130s from Ream had completed a sweep of the coast from Trat to Sattahip. They had sighted one coastal defence ship and one torpedo boat at Ko Chang, and one gunboat, four torpedo boats, and two submarines at Sattahip.

Their report was forwarded to Marine Headquarters in Saigon, who re-transmitted it to Lamotte-Picquet. Bérenger considered his options and decided on a dawn attack against the Thai ships at Ko Chang. He ignored Sattahip because the sloops would not be able to reach it until later in the day, when the element of surprise would already have been lost. Also, the strength of Sattahip's harbour defences was unknown. The Thai naval force at Ko Chang was weaker and thus offered a better chance of victory.

Bérenger approached Ko Chang at dawn from the southwest. Because the anchorage was surrounded by islands and islets, many over 200 metres (660 ft) high, the squadron separated and used the cover of the islands to concentrate fire on portions of the Thai squadron, while also covering all the avenues of escape. The easternmost channel was the most likely route by which a breakout could be made. It was the most suitable route and where the reconnaissance had placed the largest Thai ships. Lamotte-Picquet headed to the eastern side of the anchorage to block the route, while the sloops blocked the center and pounded the Thai ships there. The smaller French ships were concentrated to the west.

== Battle ==
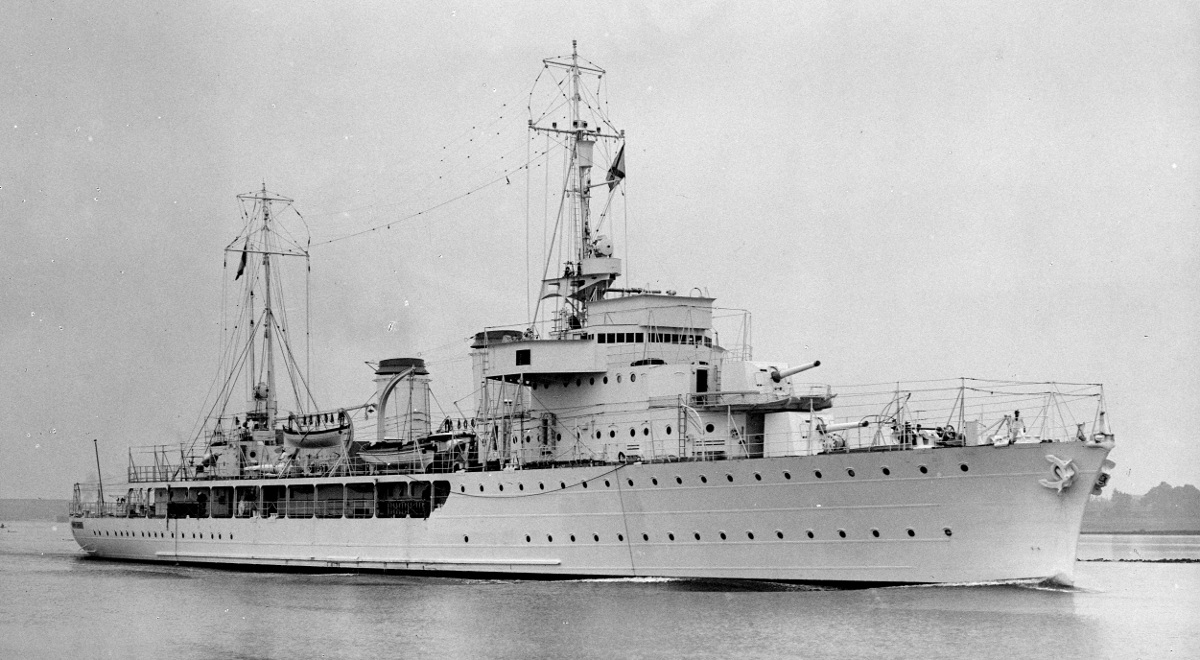
Amiral Charner

The French squadron closed on the anchorage at 05:30 on 17 January. At 05:45, they split into the three groups as planned, Lamotte-Picquet heading for the eastern part of the anchorage, Dumont d'Urville and Amiral Charner continuing to the central position, and Tahure and Marne heading for the western side. Conditions were ideal. The weather was fine, the seas calm and almost flat. Sunrise was at 06:30, and the scene was lit only by the first rays of light on the horizon and by the dim moonlight.

A final aerial reconnaissance of the target area had been arranged, using one of the Ream-based Loire 130s. Lamotte-Picquet carried two such aircraft, but these could not be launched due to catapult problems. At 06:05, the Loire 130 overflew the anchorage and reported two torpedo boats. This came as a nasty surprise to the French. Previous reports led them to believe that only one was present, but during the night HTMS Chonburi had arrived to relieve HTMS Chantaburi, which returned to Sattahip later that day for repairs.

Once their presence had been reported to Lamotte-Picquet, the aircraft attempted a bombing attack, but were driven off by a heavy barrage of anti-aircraft fire. The French were now aware of what they faced, but the element of surprise had been wasted and thirty minutes remained until sunrise. Having been caught with their crews asleep, the Thai ships desperately began to raise steam and prepared to slip their anchors. However, both torpedo boats were soon sunk by heavy gunfire from Lamotte-Picquet. The cruiser also destroyed a shore observation post, preventing the Thai from quickly relaying information to their air forces at Chantaboun.

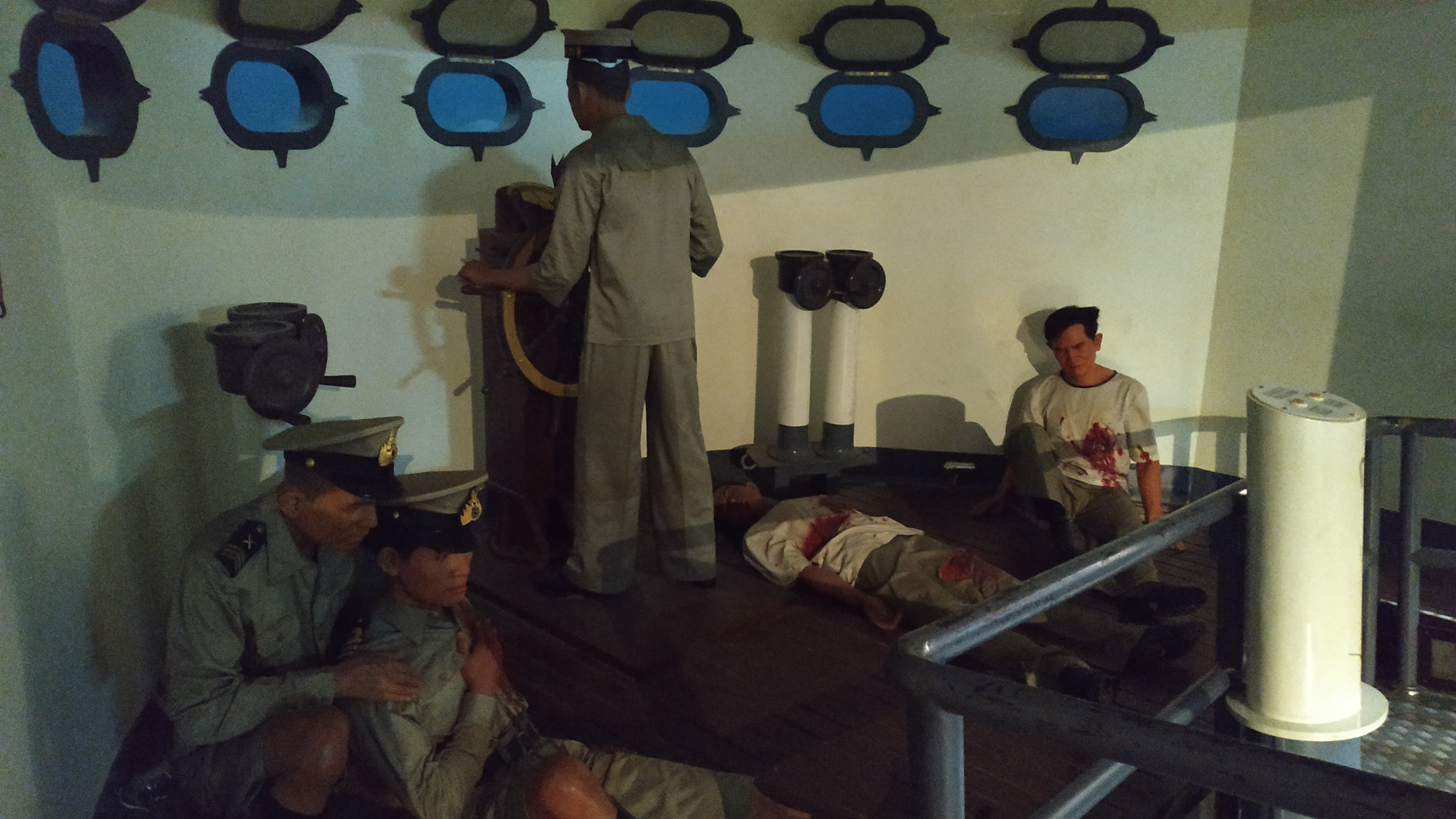
Diorama shown inside HTMS Thonburi during the Battle of Koh Chang, displayed at the Thai National Memorial, Pathum Thani Province.

At 06:38, lookouts aboard Lamotte-Picquet spotted the coastal defence ship HTMS Thonburi heading northwest, at a range of 10,000 metres (11,000 yd). A running battle began, with the ships' shell trajectories frequently blocked by the towering islets. The fire from the Thai ship was heavy, but inaccurate. By 07:15, fires could be seen on Thonburi, which then found herself engaging not only by the cruiser but also the sloops. At the beginning of the engagement, a lucky shot from Lamotte-Picquet killed the captain of Thonburi, Commander Luang Phrom Viraphan, and disrupted her operations. Believing they had a better chance of hurting the smaller French ships, the Thais shifted their fire onto Amiral Charner, which soon found 8-inch salvoes falling around her.

Thonburi shifted fire back to Lamotte-Picquet after a salvo from the French cruiser put her aft turret out of action. She soon reached the safety of shallow water, which the French ships could not enter for fear of grounding, but Thonburi was already burning fiercely and listing heavily to starboard. Her remaining turret was jammed and could not fire unless the manoeuvres of the ship put it in an appropriate position. At 07:50, Lamotte-Picquet fired a final salvo of torpedoes at 15,000 metres (16,000 yd), but lost sight of Thonburi behind an island from which she was not seen to emerge.

At 08:40, Bérenger ordered the squadron to head for home, but this coincided with the start of the expected Thai air attacks. Thai planes dropped several bombs close to Lamotte-Picquet and scored one direct hit; however, the bomb failed to explode. Lamotte-Picquet's anti-aircraft guns put up a vigorous barrage and further attacks were not pressed home. The final raid occurred at 09:40, after which the French squadron returned to Saigon.

== Aftermath ==
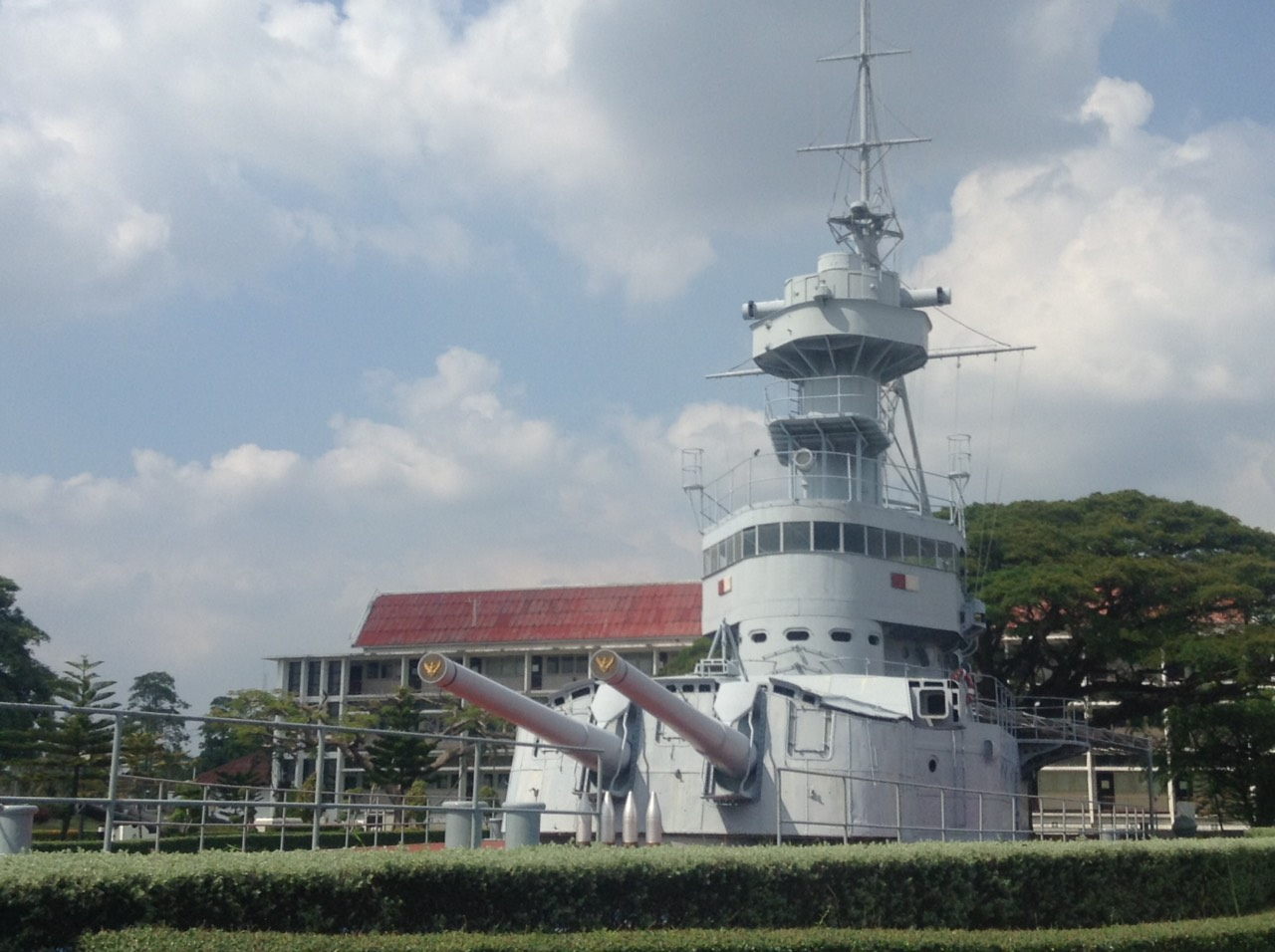
HTMS Thonburi Memorial, Royal Thai Naval Academy, Samut Prakan, Thailand

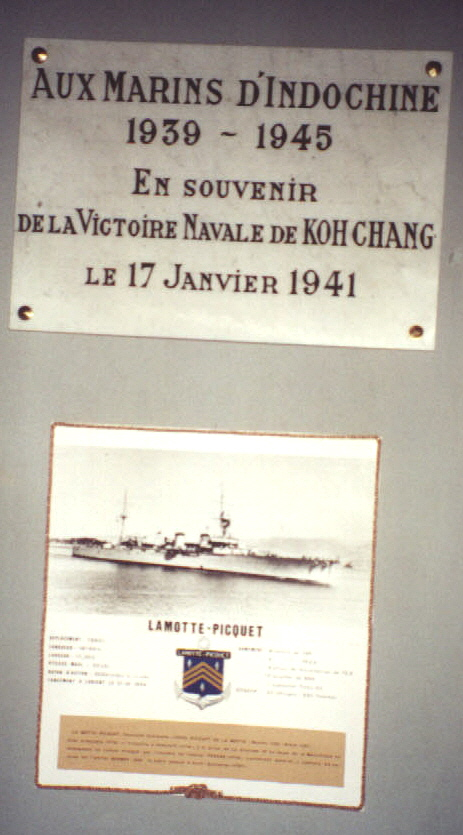
A plaque commemorating the battle

The French left behind them a scene of total devastation. Thonburi was heavily damaged and grounded on a sand bar in the mouth of the Chanthaburi river, with about 20 dead. The Thai transport HTMS Chang arrived at Ko Chang shortly after the French departed and took Thonburi in tow, before purposefully running her aground again in Laem Ngop. The ship capsized in the shallow waters. The torpedo boat Chonburi was sunk with a loss of two men, as was HTMS Songkhla with fourteen dead. The survivors were rescued by the torpedo boat HTMS Rayong, the minelayer HTMS Nhong Sarhai, and the fishery protection vessel Thiew Uthok. These three ships, which had been sheltering to the north of Ko Chang, chose not to break cover and were not spotted by the French. On the other hand, the French sailors were elated, believing they had inflicted a decisive defeat while not suffering losses of significance, with only 11 men killed.

The French did not have the time to capitalize on their success. Fearing that any further action by the French might turn back the Thai invasion, the Japanese government offered to mediate a peaceful settlement. The agreement ultimately confirmed the Thai annexations of the territory they had lost to France in the late-19th century. However, this peace did not last long, as the Imperial Japanese Army invaded Thailand in December of that year as part of its attempt to capture British Malaya. At the conclusion of World War II, Thailand was forced to return all of its short-lived gains to French Indochina.

Thonburi was later raised by the Royal Thai Navy. She was repaired in Japan and was used as a training ship until she was finally decommissioned. Her guns and bridge are preserved as a memorial at the Royal Thai Naval Academy at Samut Prakan.

During the post-action investigations, the Thai Navy claimed, based on statements by Thai sailors and the fisherman around Ko Chang and merchantmen in Saigon, that heavy damage was seen to have been caused to Lamotte-Picquet and her squadron. The report claimed the crew of Lamotte-Picquet spent all of the following night repairing the damage. Such claims are not mentioned in any French documentation, nor in the ships' logs.

== See also ==
- Military history of France
- Military history of France during World War II
- List of French wars and battles
