= Dhanpuri =

Burhar- Dhanpuri Dhanpuri
- city
- Location in Madhya Pradesh, India Burhar- Dhanpuri (India)
- Coordinates: 23°14′14″N 81°27′12″E
- Country: India
- State: Madhya Pradesh
- District: Shahdol

Government
  - Body: cong

Population (2001)
  - Total: 43,914

Languages
  - Official: Hindi
- Time zone: UTC+5:30 (IST)
- Vehicle registration: MP18

Dhanpuri is a city and a municipality in Shahdol district in the state of Madhya Pradesh, India.

== Demographics ==
As of the 2001 India census, Dhanpuri had a population of 43,914. Males constitute 53% of the population and females 47%. Dhanpuri has an average literacy rate of 75%, higher than the national average of 59.5%: male literacy is 82% and, female literacy is 68%. In Dhanpuri, 14% of the population is under 6 years of age.

== Culture and Economy ==
This area is mainly known for coal mines many coal mine are operated here. 484114 is pin code of Dhanpuri.

The Jwalamukhi temple is major attraction of the town. And the mosque which is famous in this area is Noori Masjid which is known for its unity between Hindu and Muslim brotherhood Amarkantak is 75 km distant.
