= Manhattan Rebellion =

1951 failed coup in Thailand

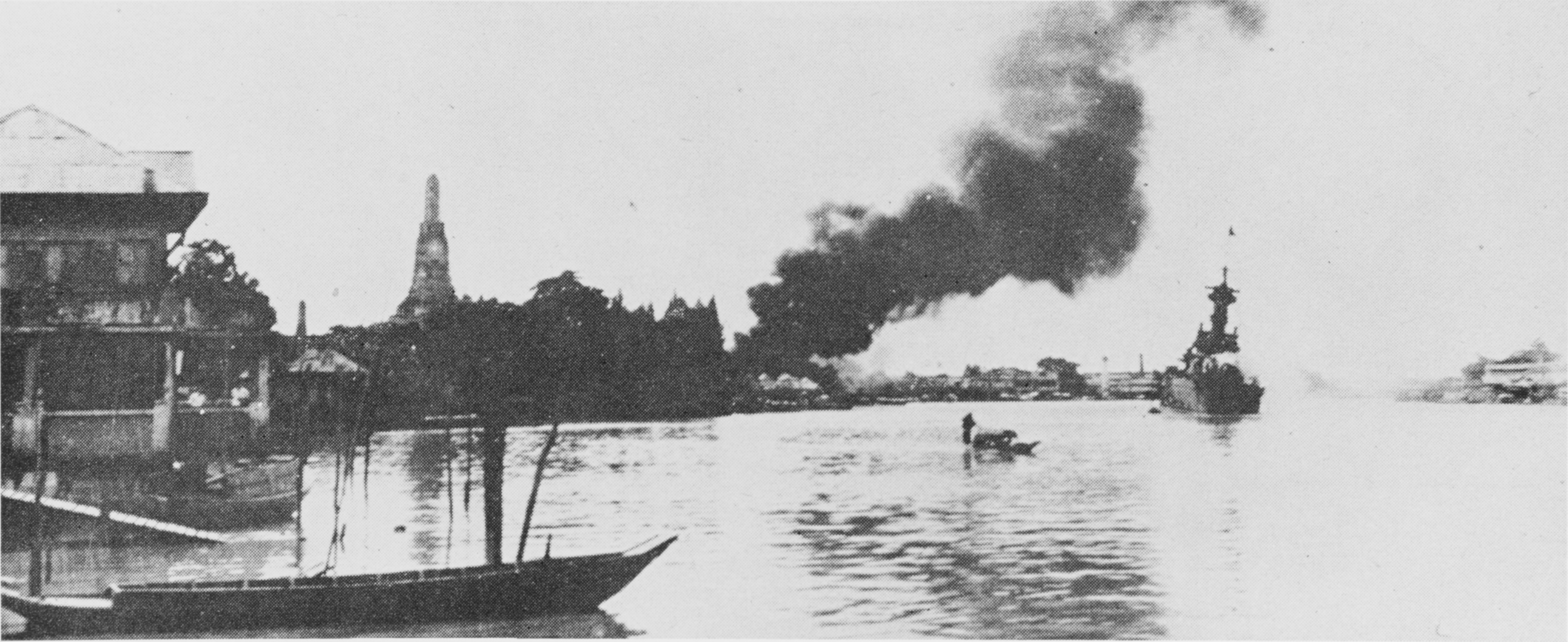
- The Sri Ayudhya sinking near the naval headquarters
Date	29 June 1951
Location	Chao Phraya River, Bangkok
Result	Government victory Role of the Navy has been reduced.

Belligerents
Phibun's Government	Group of naval officers

Commanders and leaders
Fuen Ronnaphagrad Ritthakhanee; Phin Choonhavan; Sarit Thanarat; Phao Sriyanond	Anon Puntharikapha; Manat Charupha

The Manhattan Rebellion (Thai: กบฏแมนฮัตตัน) was a failed coup attempt by officers of the Royal Thai Navy against the government of Prime Minister Plaek Phibunsongkhram (Phibun) on 29–30 June 1951. They took the prime minister hostage during a handover ceremony for the US dredge Manhattan and brought him aboard the Navy's flagship HTMS Sri Ayudhya. However, they were met by the combined forces of the Royal Thai Army, Air Force and Police, who remained loyal to the government. Heavy fighting ensued, and Sri Ayudhya was sunk despite Phibun's presence on board; the prime minister had to swim ashore along with the ship's crew. The event led to the Navy being stripped of most of its power and influence. It also showed that political power actually lay with commanders of the Armed Forces rather than the prime minister during this period of history, a fact which would resurface several other times during the Cold War.

== Events ==
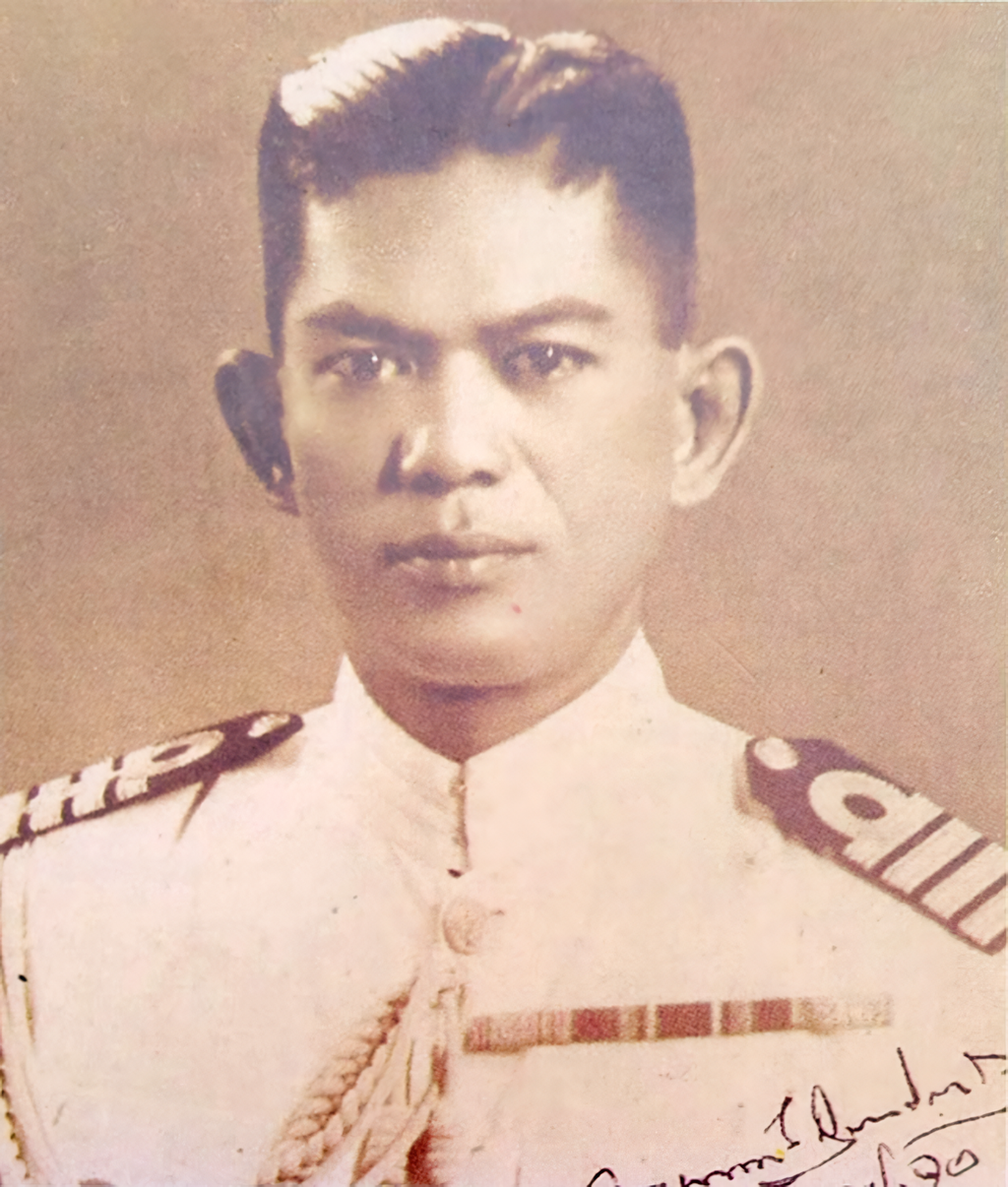
Captain Anon Puntharikapha

On 29 June 1951, a group of junior naval officers seized Phibun at gunpoint while he was attending the transfer ceremony of the former United States Army Corps of Engineers dredge ship Manhattan to the Thai navy at Ratchaworadit Pier on the Chao Phraya River in Bangkok. Phibun was forcibly taken aboard the Thai navy flagship HTMS Sri Ayudhya and held hostage. General stations were called, and the ship began to make way downstream towards the Naval Ordnance Department in Bang Na. However, the coup plotters failed to secure the opening of the Memorial Bridge, so the warship could not continue downstream. Fighting quickly ensued, and the naval units that sided with the rebels became heavily outnumbered by the army, police and air force, who were loyal to the government. Fighting subsided during the night of 29 June, but resumed and intensified early the next morning. Sri Ayudhya joined the fight, but its engines were soon disabled and the ship became dead in the water in front of Wichaiprasit Fort. It was heavily fired upon from the eastern bank by guns and mortars, and, by afternoon, was also bombarded by North American AT-6 trainer aircraft. Heavy fires broke out, and the order was given to abandon ship. Phibun had to swim ashore along with the sailors, but was uninjured. The fires continued throughout the night and into the next day, when fighting ceased. The heavily damaged Sri Ayudhya finally sank on the night of 1 July.

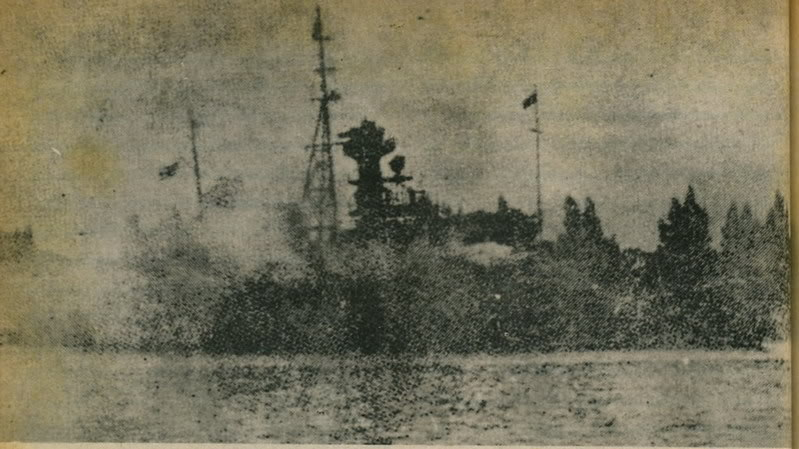
Sri Ayudhya under heavy attack

The struggle led to the deaths of 17 military personnel, eight police officers, and 103 civilians. More than 500 people were wounded. Property damage amounted to 15 million baht and the loss of the navy's most powerful warship. According to The New York Times, there were 68 deaths.

In the aftermath, the navy's leadership was immediately fired, including Admiral Sindhu, its top commander. Seventy other officers were relieved of duty. More than 1,300 sailors suspected of joining or aiding the rebellion were arrested. All naval combat aircraft were handed over to the air force. Heavy naval weapons were confiscated. Naval bases in Bangkok were relocated to outer provinces such as Chonburi and Samut Prakan. The Royal Thai Marine Corps was downsized and placed under army command. The naval submarine fleet was decommissioned.

The wreck of Sri Ayudhya was later salvaged for scrap, as it had become a navigational hazard. The ship was officially struck from the naval register on 8 October 1959, by Ministerial Order 350/21315.
