= List of Thai military equipment of World War II =

Thailand (Formerly known as Siam prior to June 1939) entered World War II in October 1940, initially against Vichy French forces in the Franco-Thai War. But Japan intervened and forced the Thai government to align with Axis forces; relations with Japan remained tense until the end of the war as Thai military were divided between supporting the Japanese Burma Campaign while splintered covert groups operated with Free Thai Movement, American Office of Strategic Services, and British Special Operations Executive towards the end of the hostilities in Asia. This page lists military equipment used during the Franco-Thai War, Malaya and Burma campaign as well as equipment later received from the Japanese and the Allies.

== Combat helmets ==
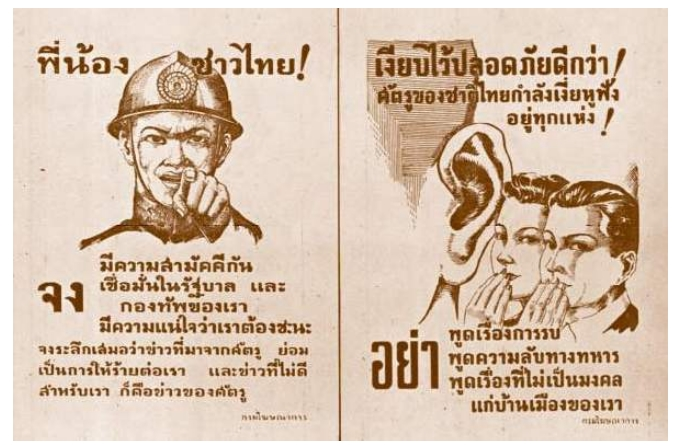
Thai propaganda poster released by Department of Information (กรมโฆษณาการ) depicting a soldier wearing an Adrian helmet.

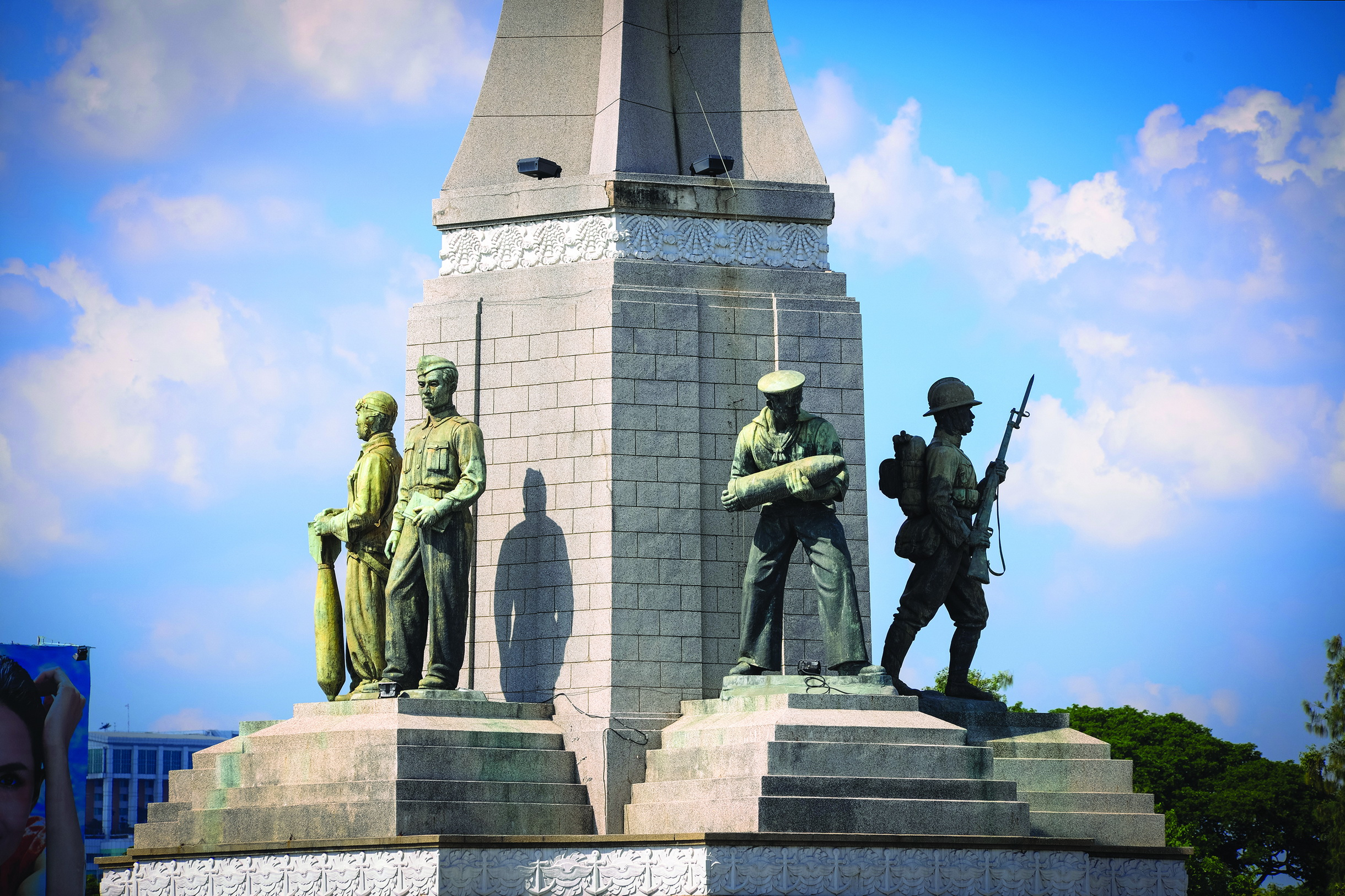
Built in 1941 to commemorate the Franco-Thai War. The Victory Monument in Bangkok features five statues of Thai servicemen and civilians who sacrificed their lives during the war. The typical Thai infantrymen equipment could be seen featured on one of the statues including an Adrian Helmet and a Mauser rifle.

All steel helmets used by Royal Thai Army featured front badge with the text "Sacrifice one's life for the nation" (สละชีพ เพื่อชาติ) while helmets of Royal Thai Navy have no front badge.

- Belgian M1920 Adrian helmet
- Belgian (and later Siamese-made) M1931 Adrian helmet produced by Belgian Tordoir (from Burcht) and Fonson (from Brussels) Companies
- Japanese surplus Type 90 Tetsubo helmet (Possibly Post-War usage only, seen with both Royal Thai Army and Royal Thai Marines.)

== Personal equipment ==
- Peaked cap (หมวกหม้อตาล)
- Side cap (หมวกหนีบ) (Emblem before 1941 is pinned on the right side and swapped to left side after December 1941)
- Pith helmet (หมวกกะโล่) (Issued since 1930s the same as those in service during Siamese Revolution and Boworadet Rebellion)
- Tanker beret (Large beret issued to Thai armored crews. Similar to French Chasseurs Alpins and German early war Panzertruppe berets.)
- Unknown type of tanker/dispatch rider helmet are also spotted with tankers and motorcycle riders.
- Khaki-Green "7 Button" Pattern standing-collar tunic (From 1930s to Franco-Thai War)
- Khaki-Green 1941 Pattern open-collar tunic (As seen with Phayap Army in Burma Campaign)
- 1903 Pattern Backpack
- Small personal shovel
- Large engineering shovel
- Bread bag
- Circular disc-shaped water flask
- British Style ammunition pouches or Japanese Style large ammunition pouch.
- Madsen ammo bag for ammunition bearers.
- Leg wraps (ผ้าพันแข้ง)
- Type 80 Gas Mask (หน้ากากป้องกันไอพิษแบบ ๘๐) local copy of German Dräger Leder B-Maske by Royal Thai Army Chemical Department (กรมวิทยาศาสตร์ทหารบก) issued to both military and civil defense usage.
- Unknown type of Pre-War European folding bicycle - Appeared on two photos of Thai soldiers with Type 38 Arisaka carbines with their folding bicycles. In 2025 a Facebook user posted his finding claiming on bicycle with Deutsches Reichsgebrauchsmuster (DRGM) markings to be a used example during World War II.
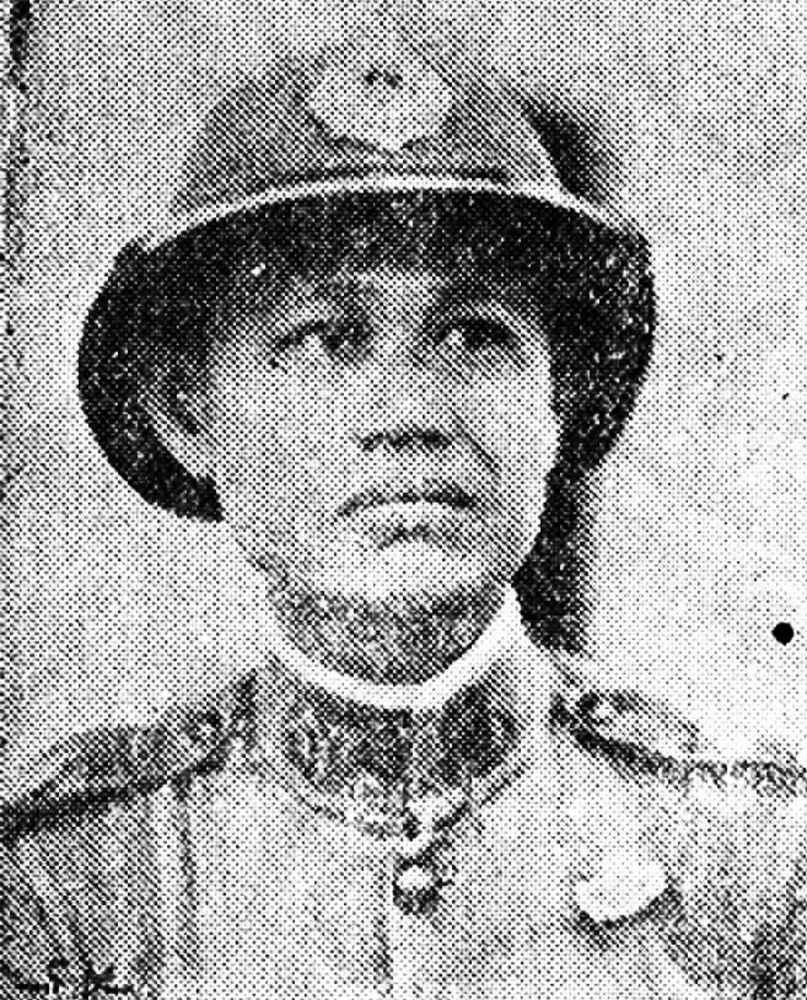
Late-War Thai Minister of Defense Chit Mansin Sinadyotharak (ชิต มั่นศิลป์ สินาดโยธารักษ์) wearing Thai pith helmet (Muak-Kalo - หมวกกะโล่).

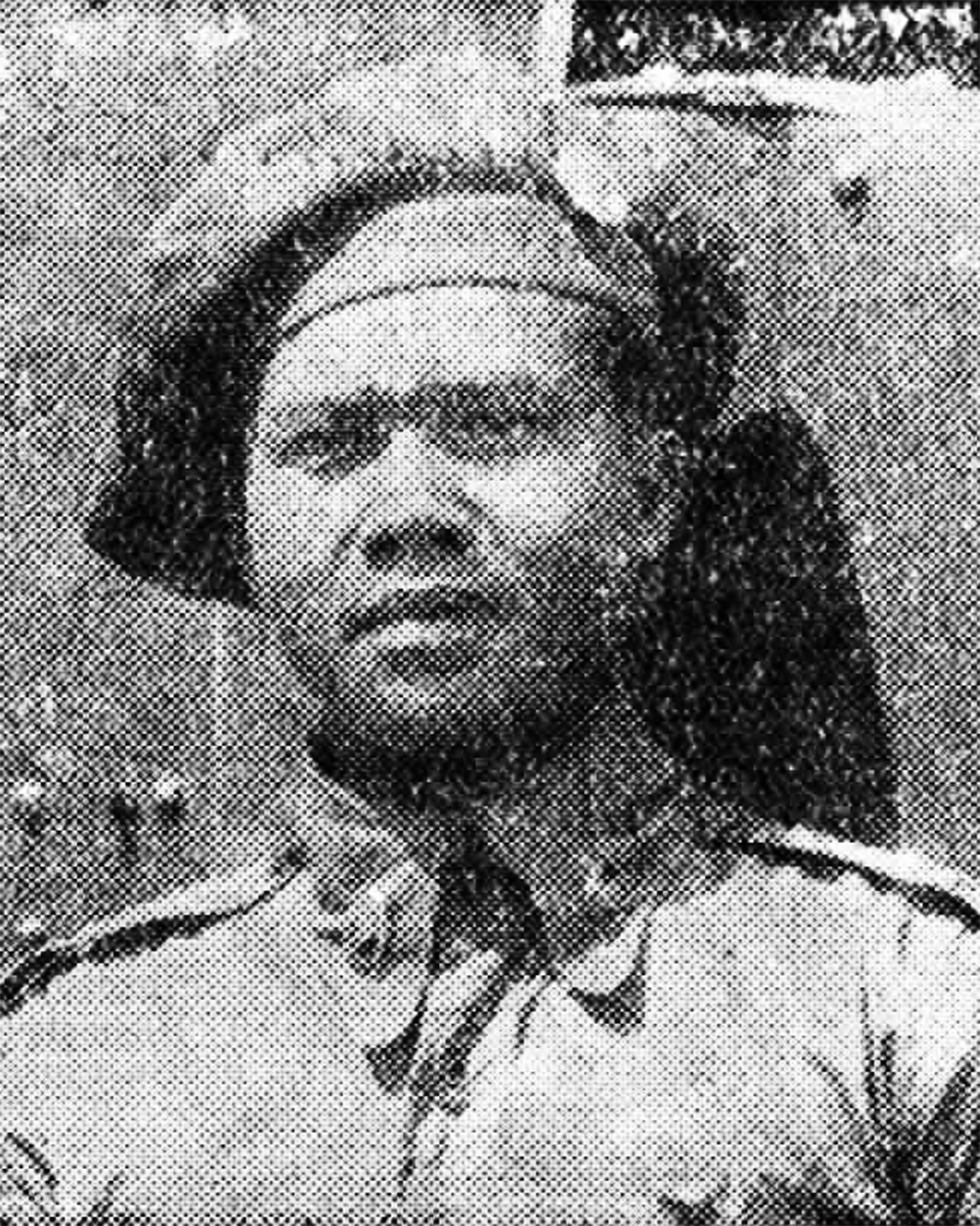
Chai Prathipasen (ไชย ประทีปะเสน) with Thai tanker beret, 1944.

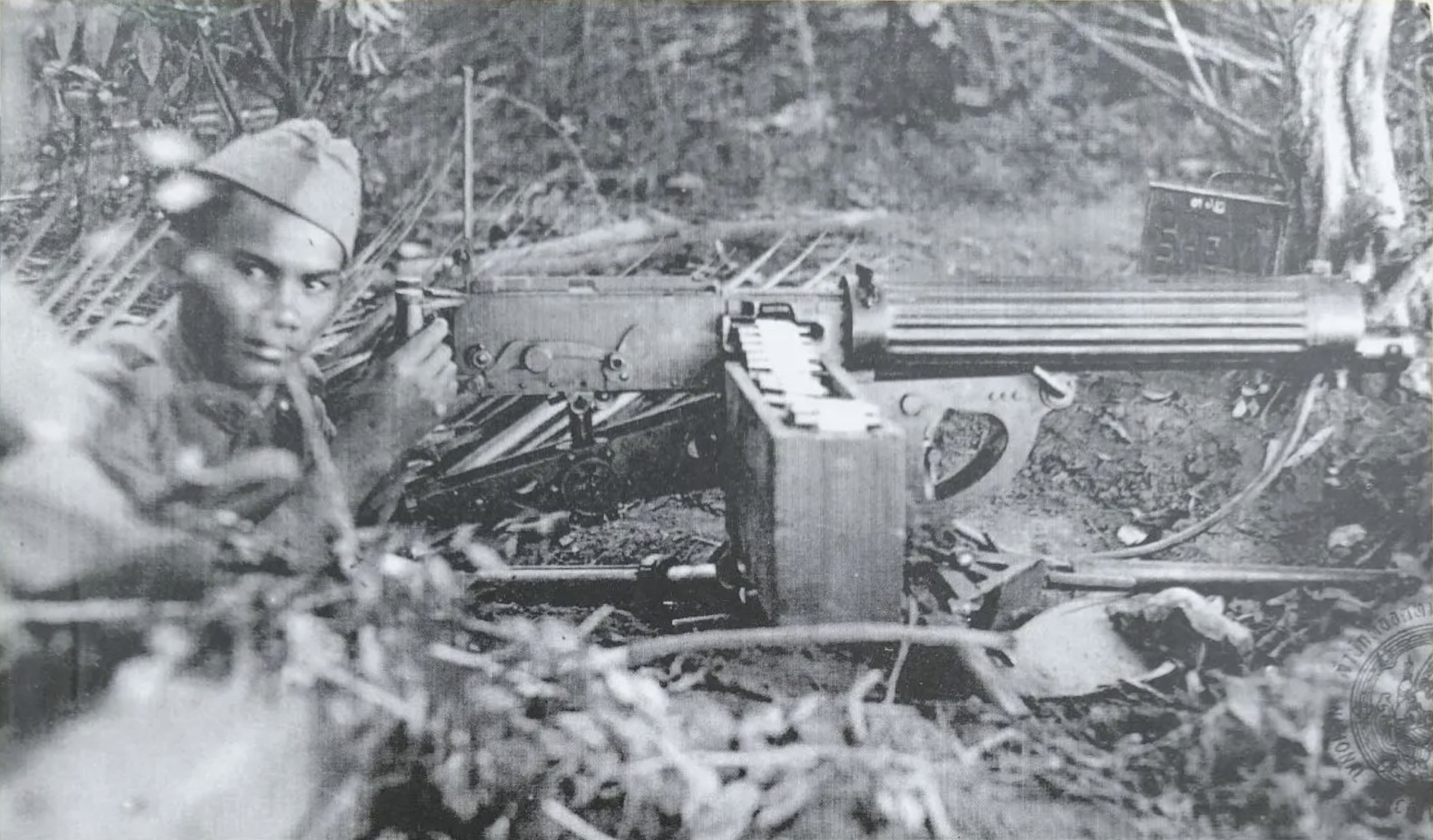
Thai soldier with side cap (Muak-Nhib - หมวกหนีบ) mounting Type 77 Vickers Machine Gun during Franco-Thai War, 1941.

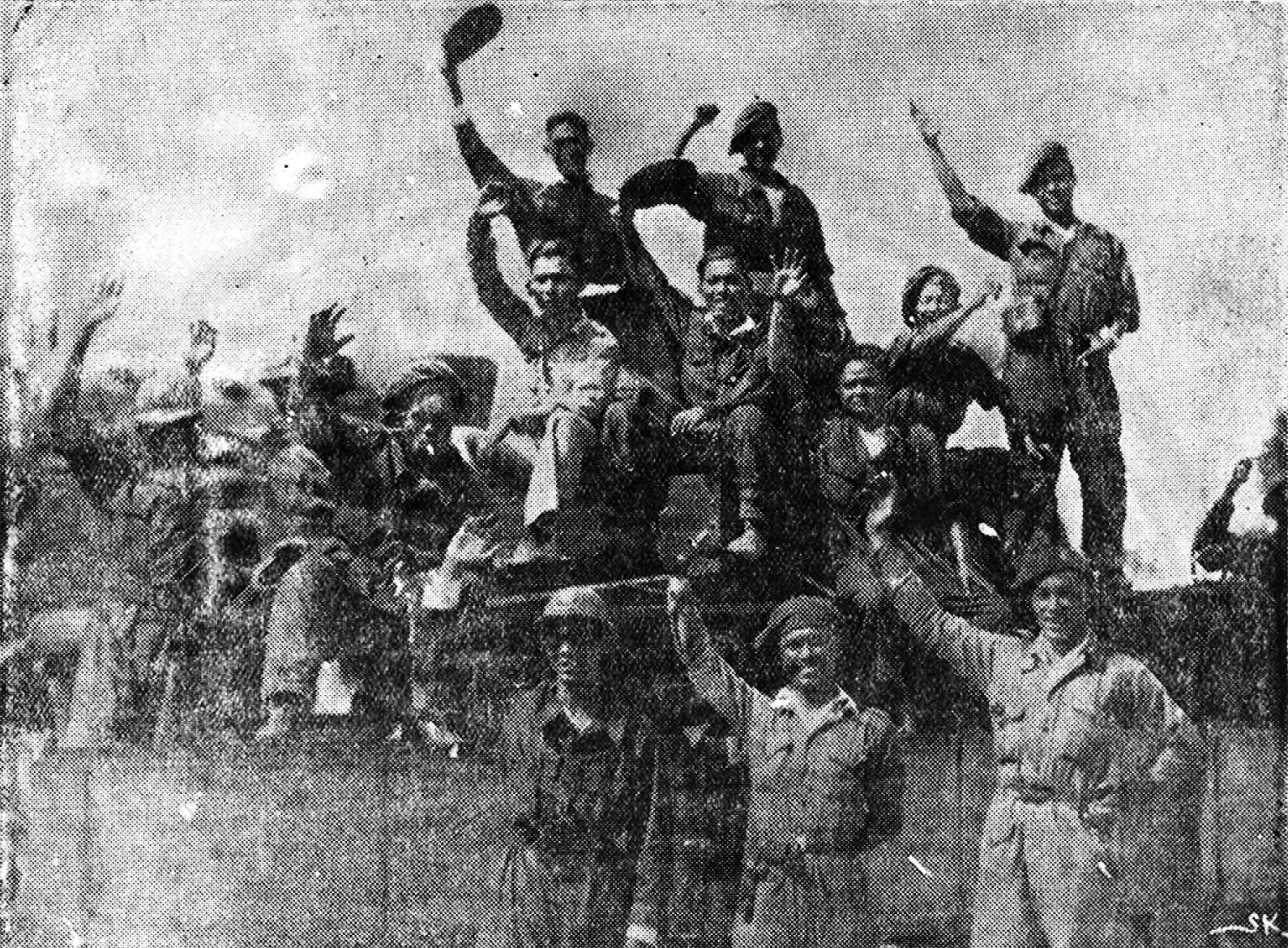
Thai vehicle crews during Boworadet Rebellion with beret and coveralls, 1933.

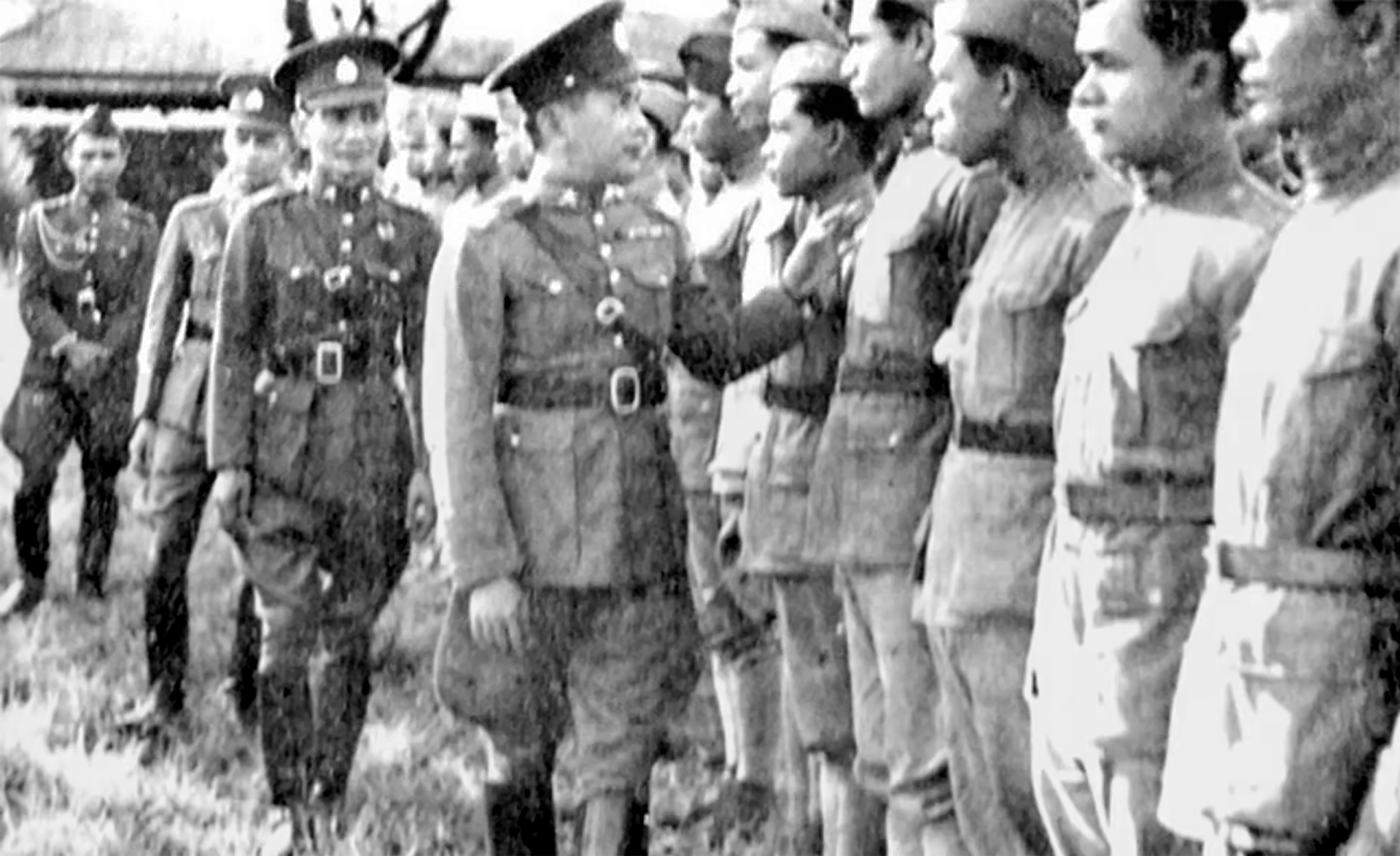
Plaek Phibunsongkhram inspects frontline soldiers during the events of Franco-Thai War, 1941.

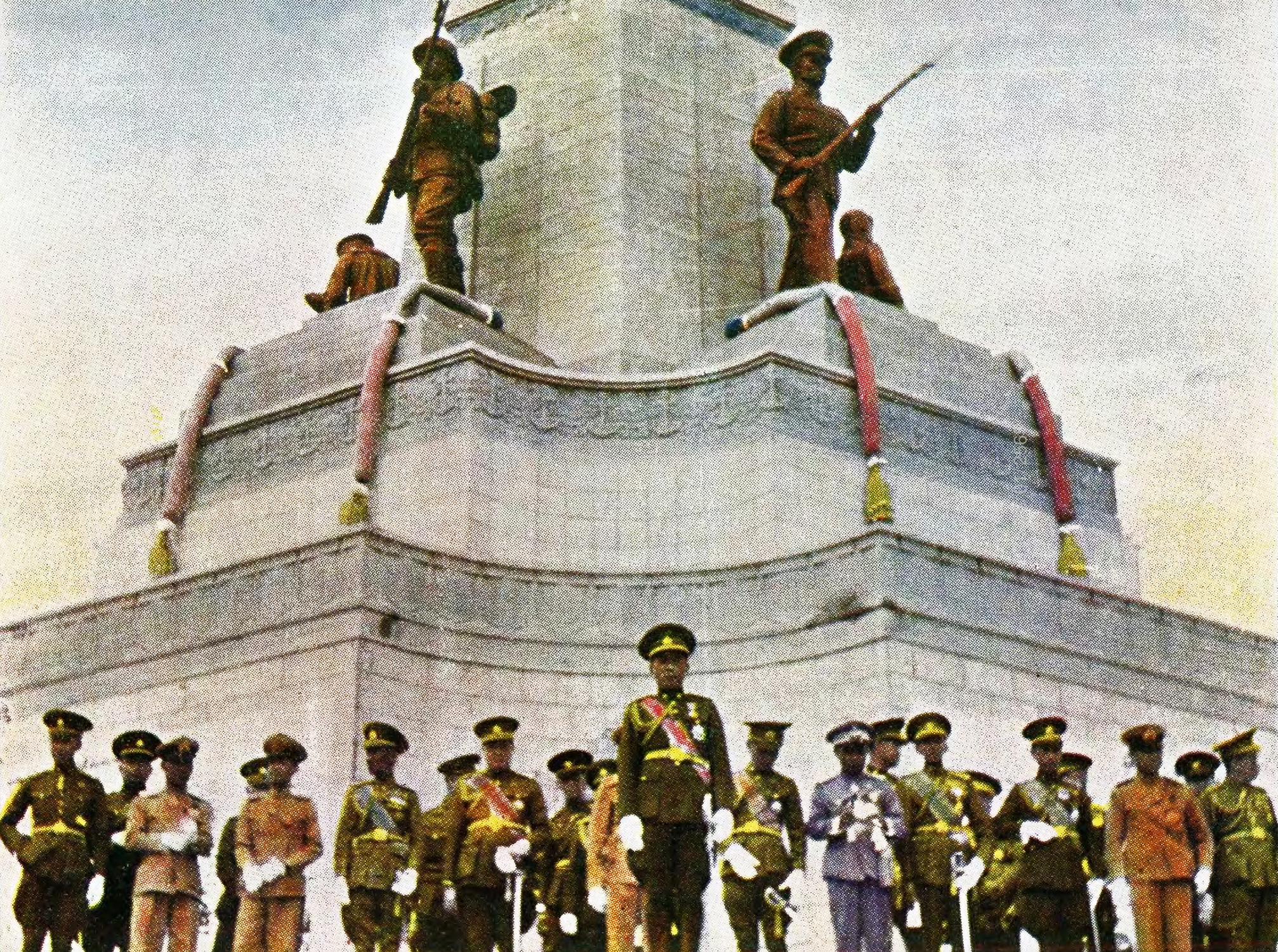
Opening ceremony of the Victory Monument in June 1942. The photo shows another side of the monument where statues of Royal Thai Army Infantryman and Royal Thai Police Policeman stood with their service rifles.
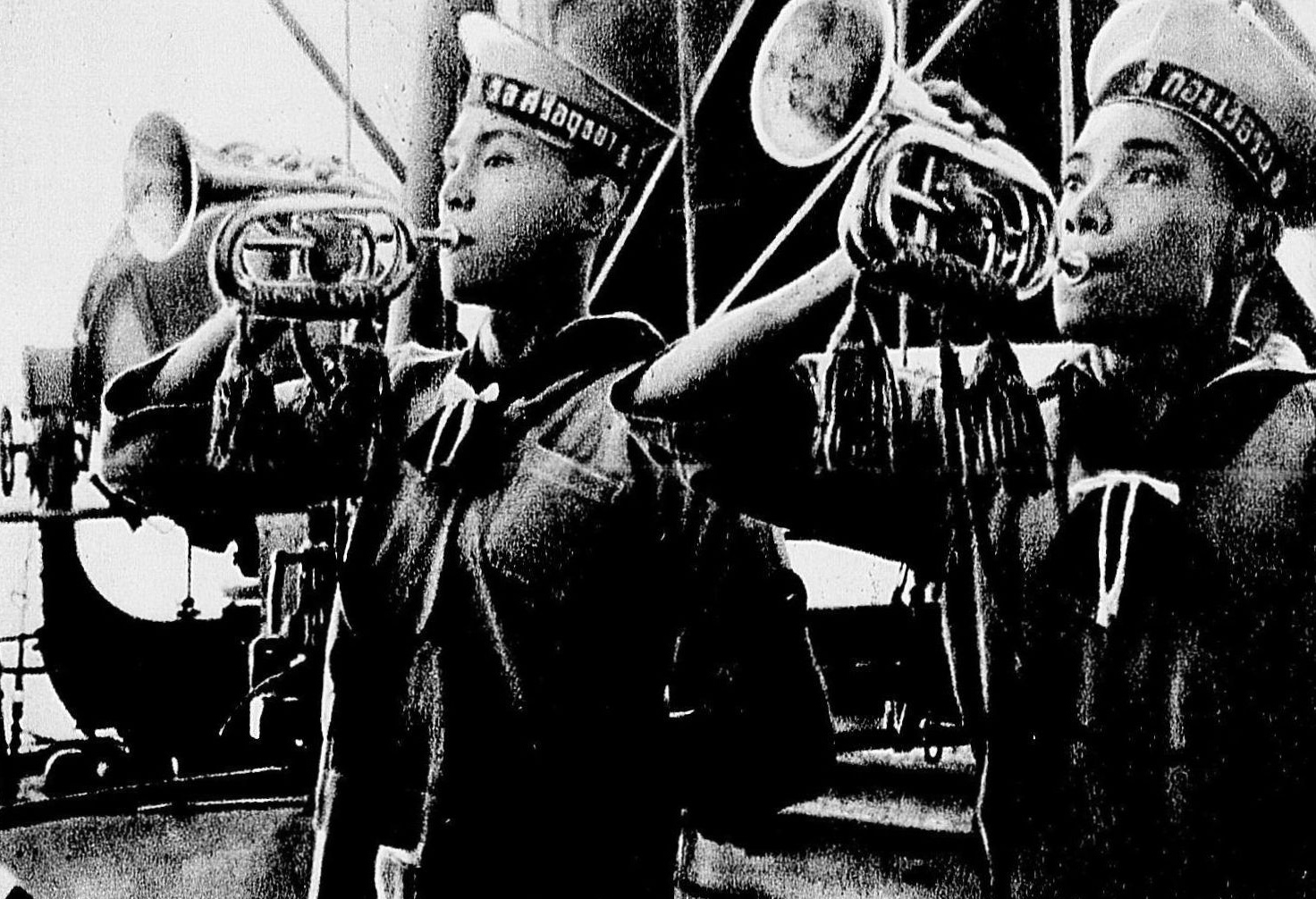
Photograph from Japanese-Indonesian Djawa Baroe Vol.1, Issue 7 (1943) showing sailors of HTMS Sri Ayudhya.

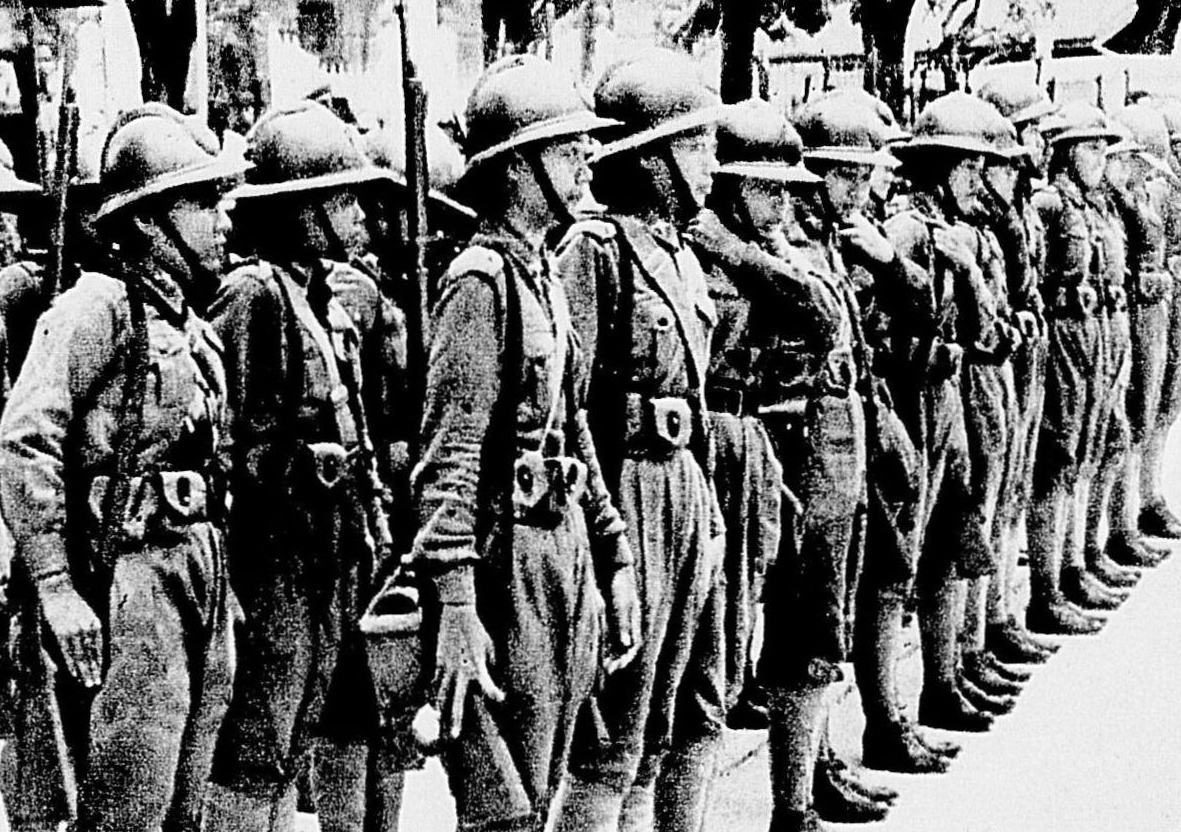
Female cadets with full combat fatigues and Adrian helmet. Djawa Baroe, Vol.1 Issue 16 (1943).

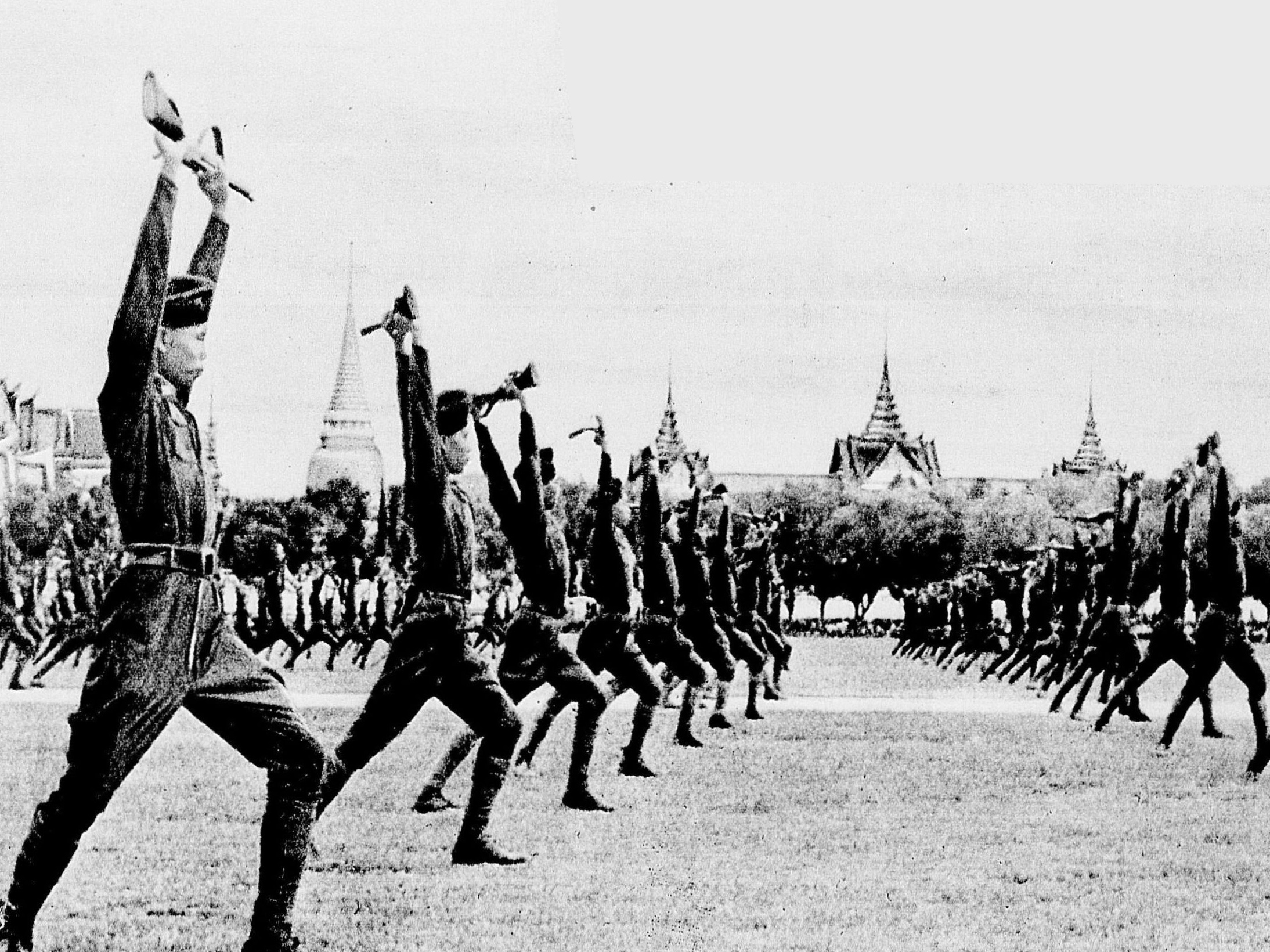
Soldiers with side cap performing drills at Sanam Luang square. Djawa Baroe, Vol.1 Issue 16 (1943).

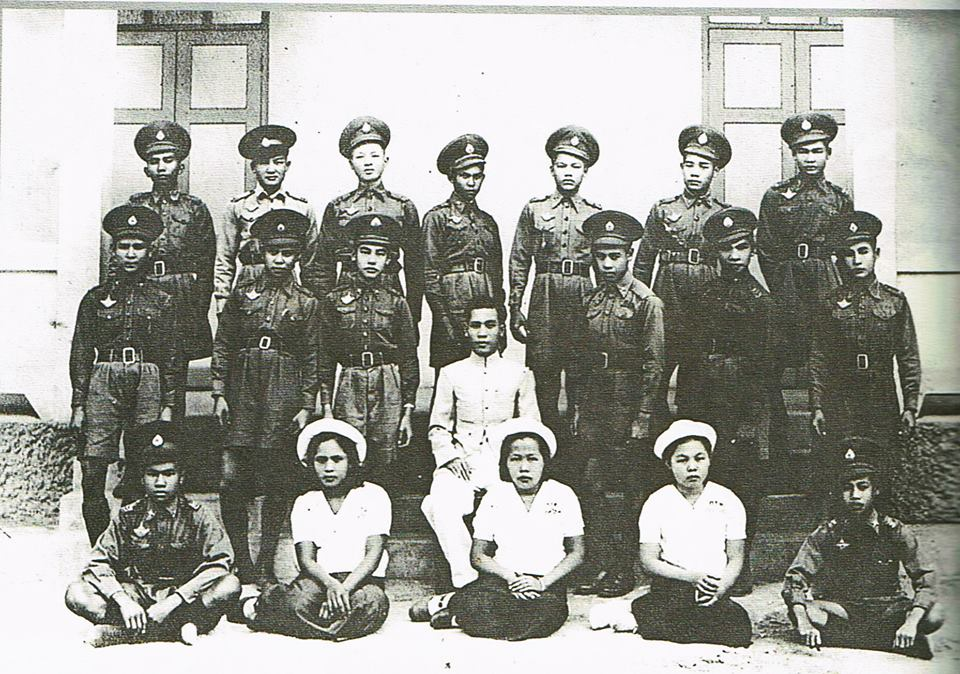
Military Youth (ยุวชนทหาร) group photo from Visuttharangsi School, Kanchanaburi.

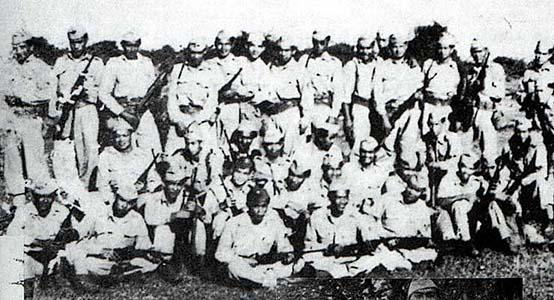
Free Thai Movement members with combat equipment.

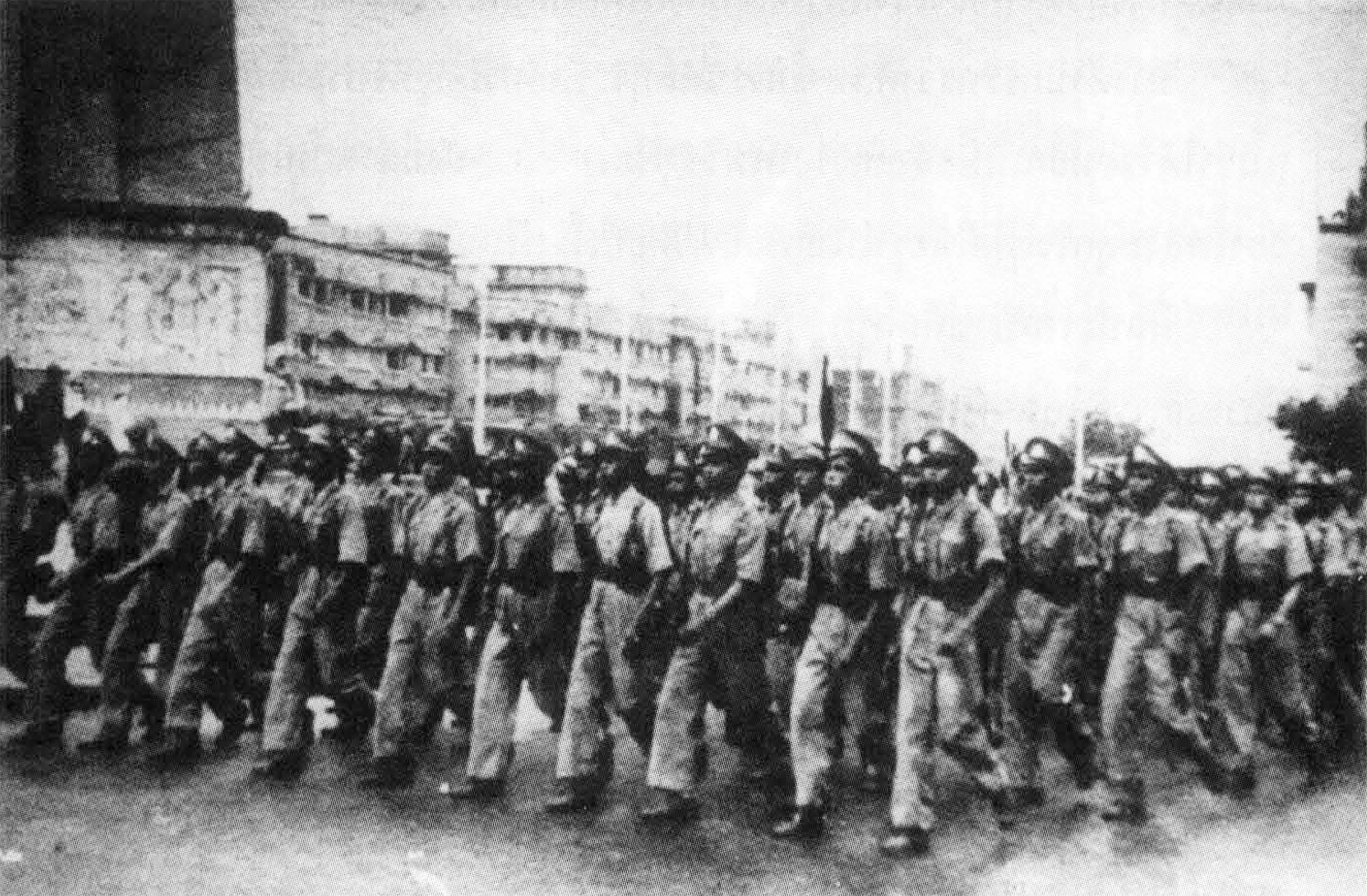
Free Thai Movement members paraded on Ratchadamnoen Avenue in Bangkok following the end of World War II.

== Edged weapons ==
- Japanese Type 30 bayonet for Arisaka rifles
- Siamese Type 45 (R.S.121) bayonet for Mauser rifles
- Siamese Type 66 bayonet for Mauser rifles
- Military Youth Dagger (มีดยุวชนทหาร)

== Small arms ==
=== Pistols ===
- Colt .38 Super (Type 79 Pistol ปืนพกแบบ ๗๙)
- Colt M1911 (Both Pre-War private purchases and Allied supported Type 86 designation)
- Star Model M (Type 80 Pistol ปืนพกแบบ ๘๐)
- FN M1900 (Type 44 A Pistol ปืนพกแบบ ๔๔ ก.)
- FN M1910 (Type 44 B Pistol ปืนพกแบบ ๔๔ ข.)
- FN M1903
- Iver-Johnson Safety Hammerless
- Nambu Type 14
- Luger (Type 78 Pistol ปืนพกแบบ ๗๘)
- Mauser C96 private purchases since late Rama-V Period.
- Type 80 (Thai copy of Spanish Star Model A)
- Type 82 (Thai copy of Colt .38 Official Police)
- Type 66 Pistol (ปืนพกแบบ ๖๖) break-action 8x52R Siamese single shot pistol with examples found at Royal Thai Army Ordnance Museum (พิพิธภัณฑ์ทหารสรรพาวุธ) or sold abroad post-war. Suggested by some historians to be a tool for euthanizing injured horses.

=== Automatic Pistols and Submachine Guns ===
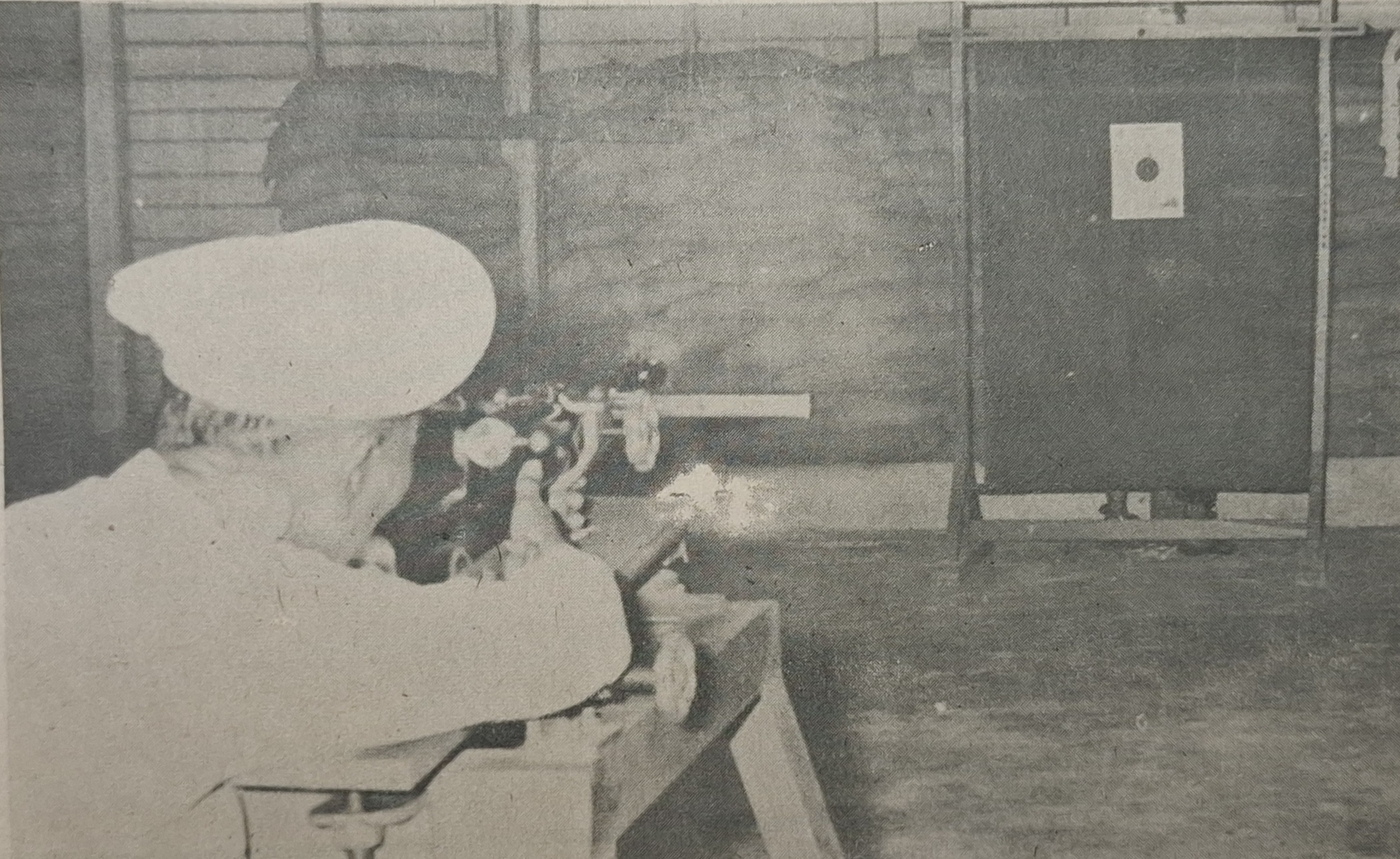
Image from 1972 showing Department of Corrections executioner and his Bergmann MP 34/I on firing line at Bang Kwang Prison.

- Bergmann MP 34/I (Precursor to MP35) used by wartime Thai Field Police. (Returned to Department of Corrections for execution service post-war)
- Type 80 machine pistol (Based on Spanish M1911-copy Star Type M Pistol)
- M3 Grease Gun "Type 86" (ปืนกลมือแบบ 86, ปกม.86) used by members of Free Thai Movement
- Sten Mk.II "Type 87" (ปืนกลมือแบบ 87, ปกม.87) used by members of Free Thai Movement
- Thompson Submachine Gun "Type 88" (ปืนกลมือแบบ 88, ปกม.88) used by members of Free Thai Movement

=== Rifles and carbines ===
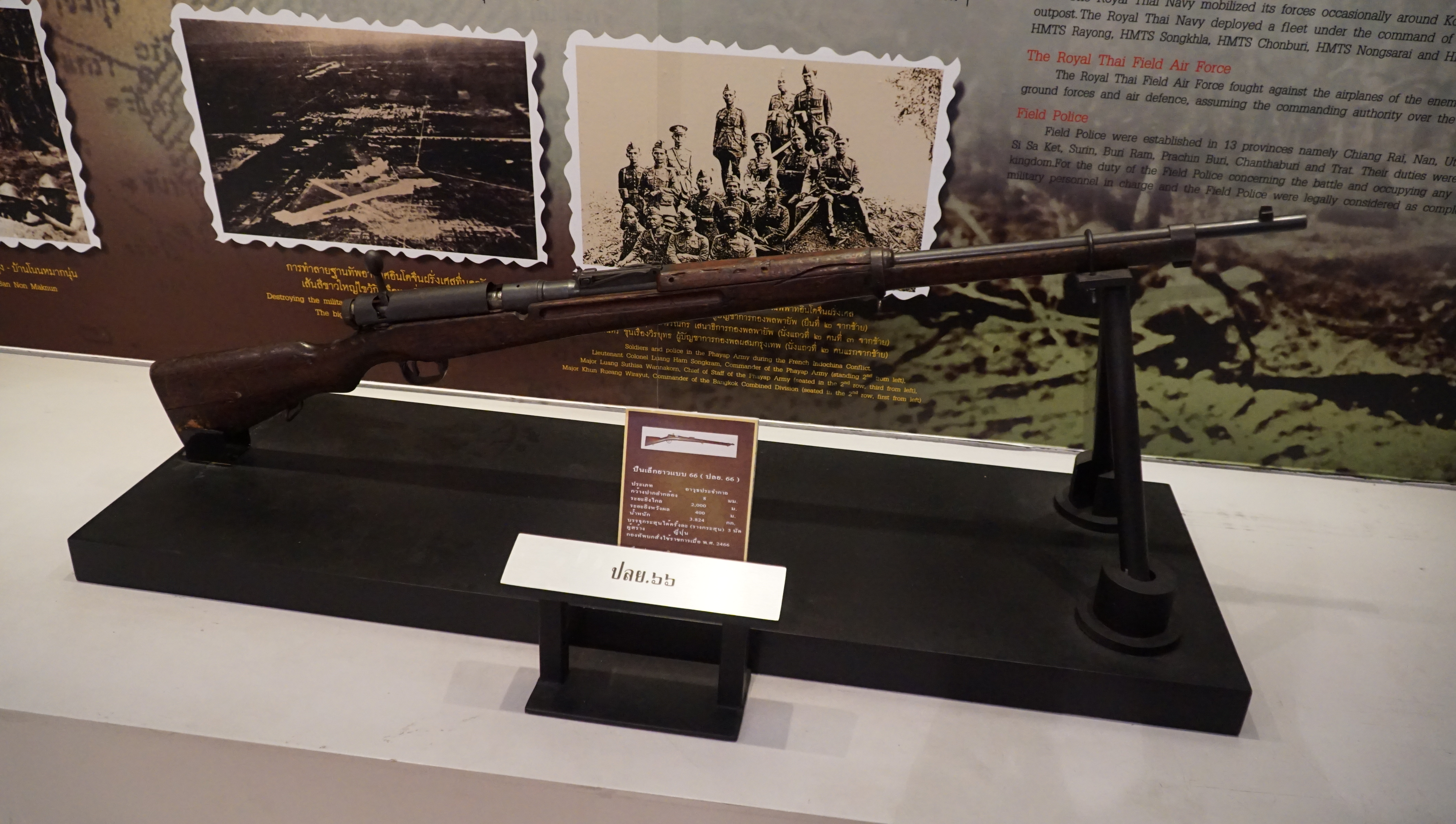
Type 66 rifle at National Memorial, Bangkok

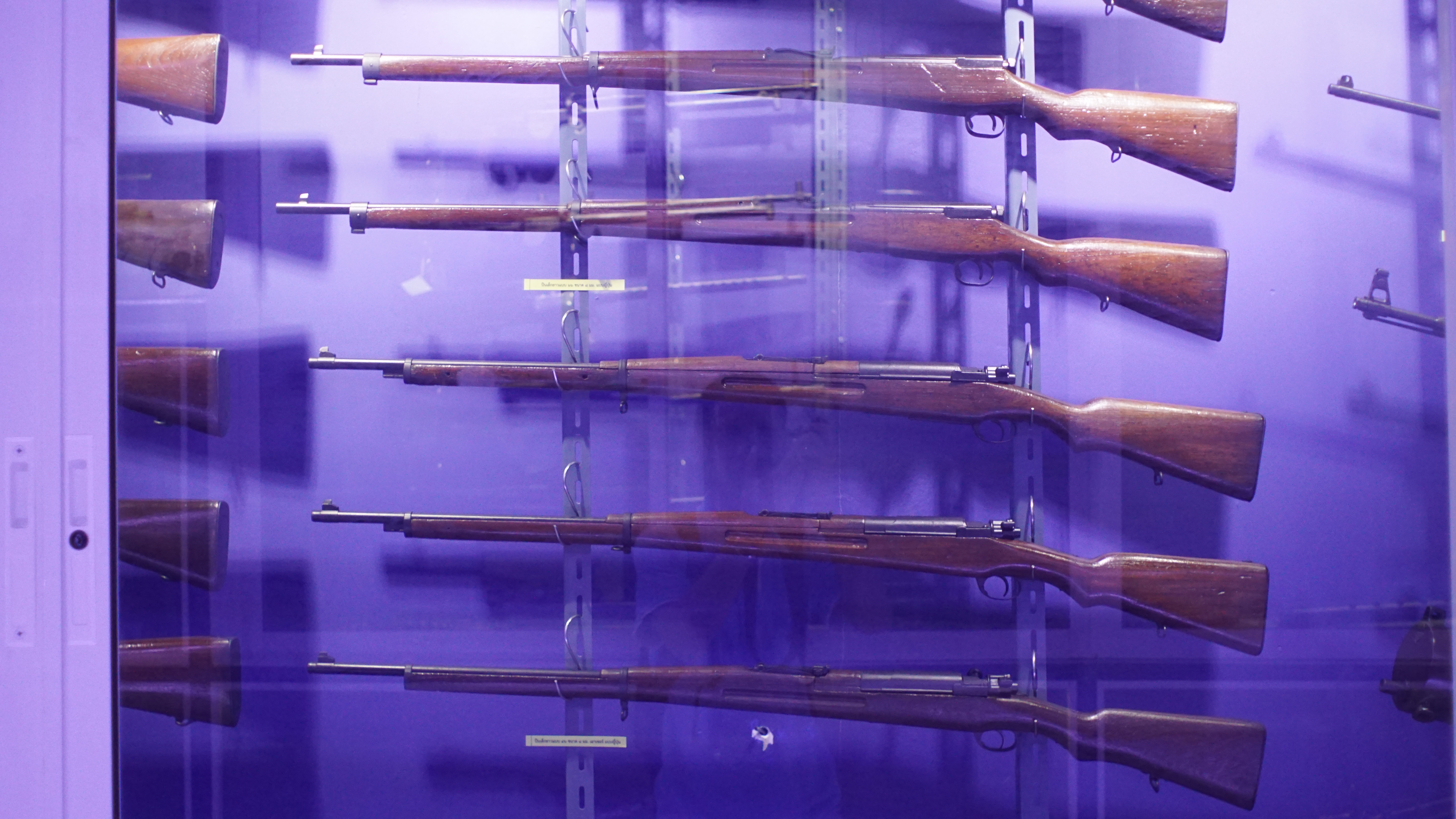
Type 46 and Type 66 rifles at the Royal Thai Air Force Museum

- Siamese Type 46 "R.S. 121" Mauser Rifle (A hybrid of German Gewehr 98 and Swedish Mauser action with Japanese Type 35 features manufactured by Koishikawa Arsenal. Uses Type 45 8×50mmR Siamese cartridge)
- Siamese Type 46/66 Mauser Rifle (Updated version with Type 66 8×52mmR Spitzer Siamese cartridge)
- Siamese Type 47 "R.S. 123" Mauser Carbine (Shortened Type 46)
- Siamese Type 47/66 Mauser Carbine (Updated carbine with Type 66 8×52mmR Spitzer cartridge)
- Siamese Type 66 Rifle (Copy of the Arisaka Type 38 with Mauser-style features delivered prior to the Second World War)
- Siamese Type 66 Carbine (Shortened version of Type 66 Rifle)
- Arisaka Type 38 (Known in Thai service as Type 83 Rifle ปืนเล็กยาวแบบ ๘๓) (From Buddhist Year 2483/1940)
- Type 38 Arisaka Carbine (Known in Thai designation as Type 83 Carbine ปืนเล็กสั้นแบบ ๘๓)
- Arisaka Type 99
- SMLE No.1 Mk.III also called "Rama-VI Rifle" and "Wild Tiger Corps Rifle" (issued to wartime Field Police to supplement Mausers in some areas.)
- M1 Garand (Designated Type 88 Autoloading Rifle used by Free Thai Movement members.)
- M1 Carbine (Designated Type 87 Autoloading Carbine used by Free Thai Movement members.)

=== Miscellaneous ===
- H.G. Cordes Bremerhaven line throwing gun Used by Royal Thai Navy.
- French M1917 "2470" Flare Pistol (1927)

=== Unconfirmed ===
- Astra 300
- MP 18
- Nambu Type 100
- ZH-29

== Machine Guns ==
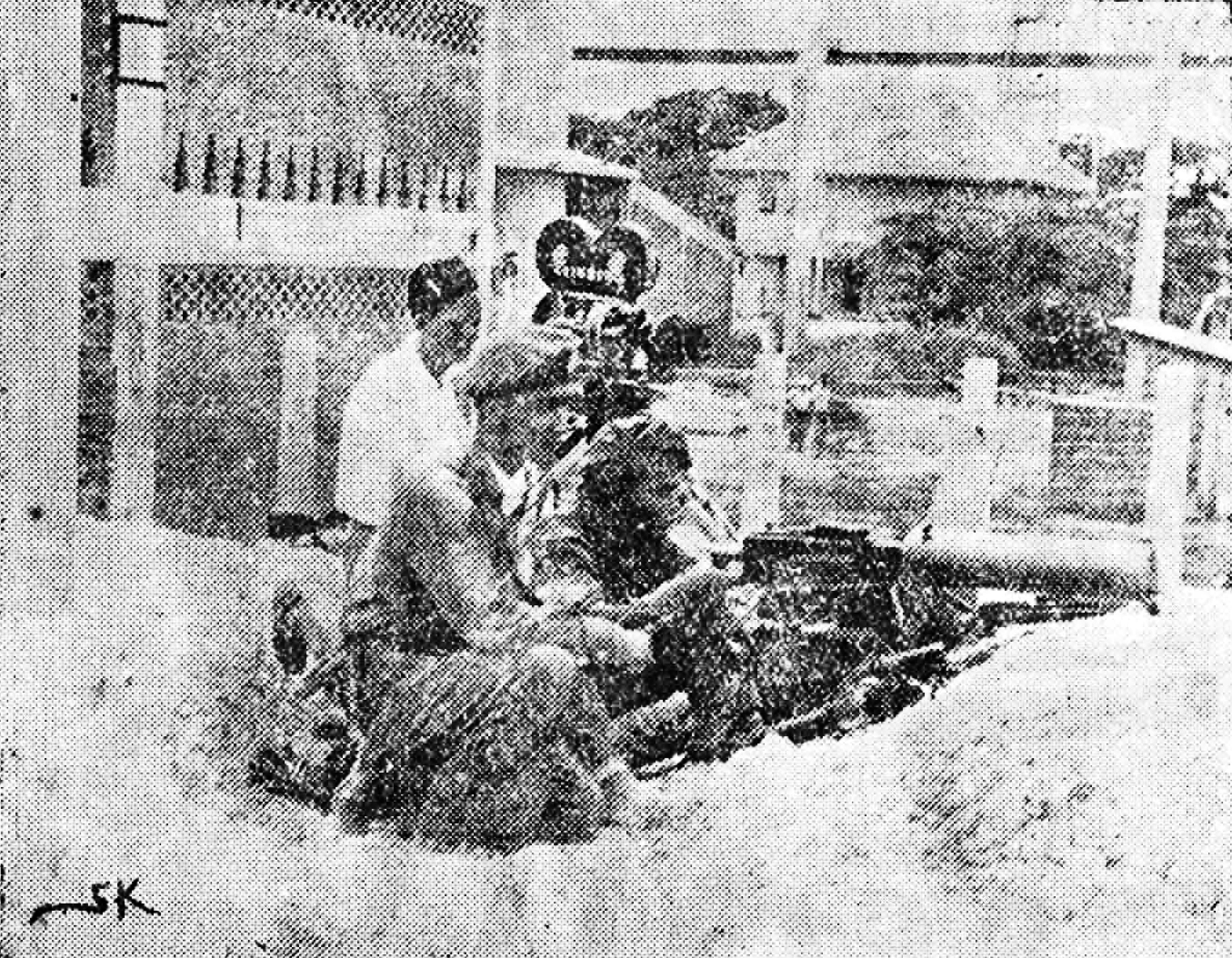
Type 66 Heavy Machine Gun (FN Browning M1917) during the events of Boworadet Rebellion, 1933

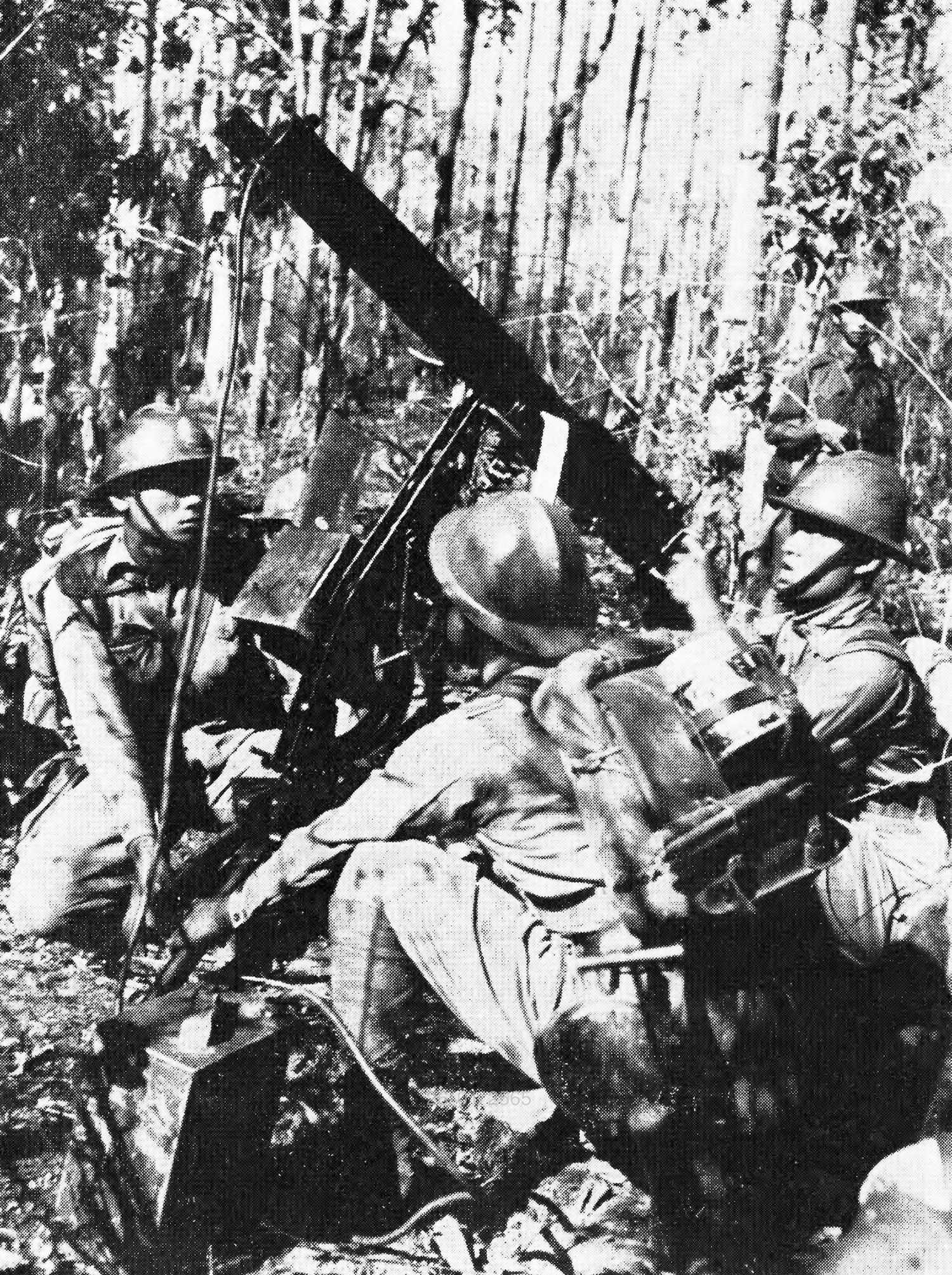
Thai Type 77 Vickers machine gun team in Burma, Phap Mueang Thai 1943.

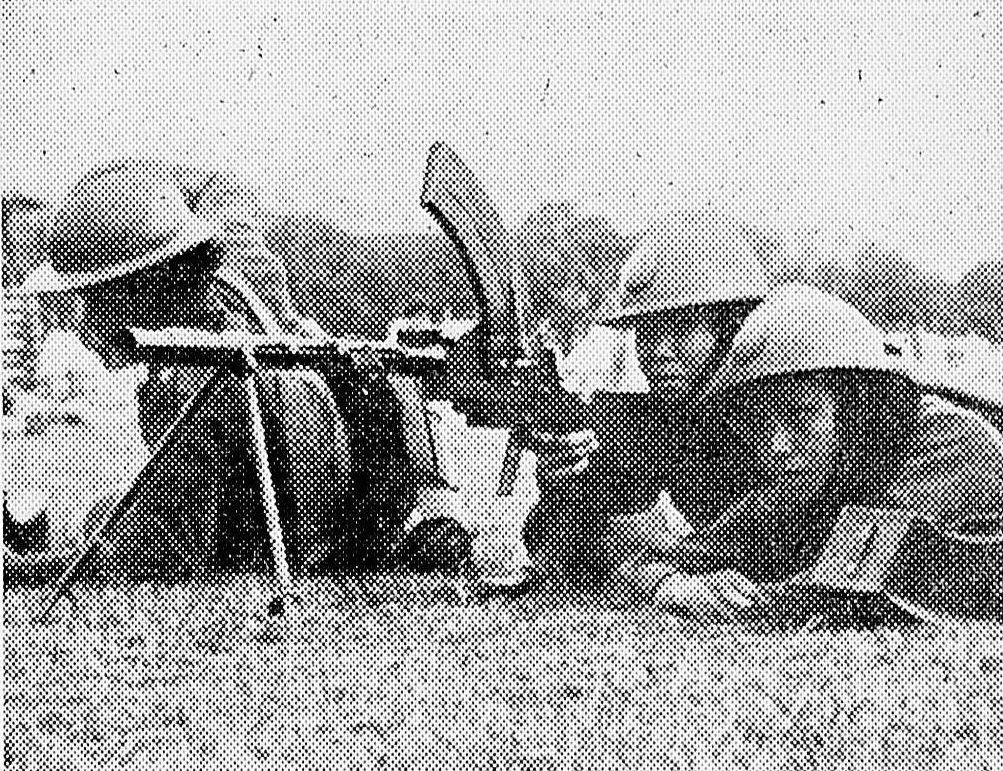
First and only cadre of Thai Female Military Cadets (นักเรียนนายร้อยหยิง) training with Type 66 Madsen machine gun, Djawa Baroe Vol.1 Issue 11 (1943).

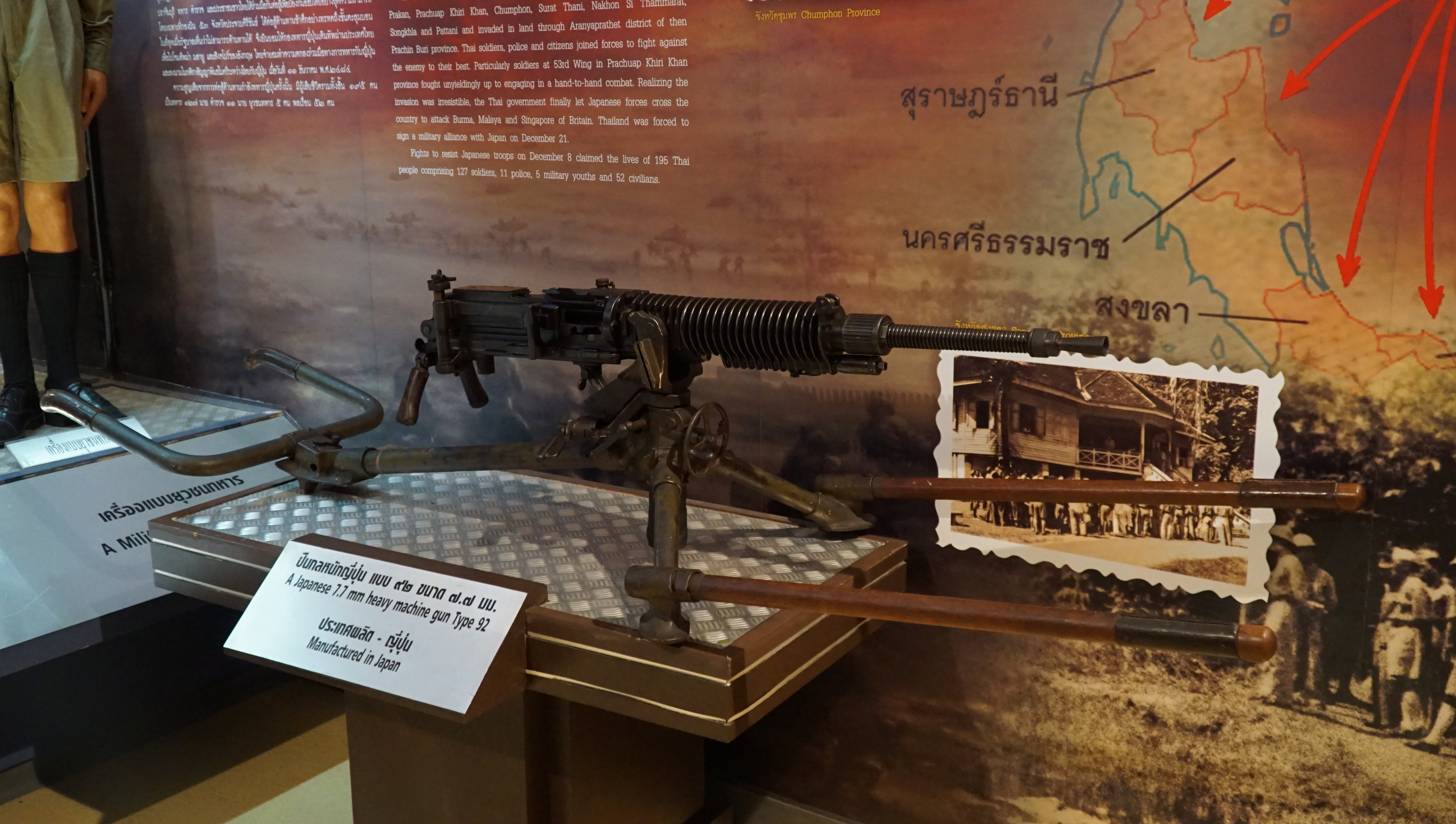
Japanese Type 92 machine gun at National Memorial.
- Type 66 Heavy Machine Gun (FN-Made M1917 Browning Heavy Machine Gun in 8x52mmR Siamese adopted in 1923.)
- Type 66 Light Machine Gun (Madsen Light Machine Gun adopted in 1923.)
- Type 77 Heavy Machine Gun (Vickers 8x52mmR Heavy Machine Gun adopted in 1934.)
- Type 80 AA Gun (Vickers .5-inch Class D) (12.7mm enlarged version of Vickers Machine Gun used in AA role adopted in 1937.)
- Type 83 Light Machine Gun (Japanese Type 96 LMG imported in 1941.)
- Japanese Type 92 Heavy Machine Gun (Designated Type 85 (2485/1942) machine gun ปืนกลแบบ ๘๕)
- Japanese Type 97 Tank Machine Gun (80 Type 97 Machine Gun ordered together with Type 95 Ha-Go)
- Japanese Type 97 Aircraft Machine Gun (Designated Type 84 Aircraft Machine Gun / ปืนกลอากาศแบบ ๘๔ in Thai Service)
- Bren Light Machine Gun (Wartime usage by members of Free Thai Movement with speculated name of Type 87 LMG) (Post-War Thai Police designation as Type 91 LMG)
- Browning M1919 (Used by members of Free Thai Movement with Allied support. Designated Type 88 Light Machine Gun / ปืนกลเบาแบบ ๘๘)
- Browning M1917 (Used by members of Free Thai Movement with designation of Type 88 Heavy Machine Gun / ปืนกลหนักแบบ ๘๘)
- M1918A2 BAR (Used by members of Free Thai Movement with designation of Type 88 Automatic Rifle / ปืนเล็กกลแบบ ๘๘)

Trials Only

- Dreyse Maschinengewehr 13 1 gun fitted with anti-aircraft tripod mount were imported for trials.

Captured Equipment

- Hotchkiss Mle 1914 Heavy Machine Gun captured during Franco-Thai War.
- Hotchkiss Mle 1922 Light Machine Gun captured during Franco-Thai War.
- FM 24/29 Light Machine Gun captured during Franco-Thai War.

== Grenades and grenade launchers ==
In 1938 there was a program to increase the production of existing infantry equipment designs such as grenades and light machine guns. Later Japanese-made grenades were imported in 1941 for the use by marines and made by Royal Thai Army Ordnance Department (กรมช่างแสงทหารบก)

| Grenade | Launcher | Introduced | Type | Weight, g | Notes |
|---|---|---|---|---|---|
| Type 78 "Goose Egg" Hand Grenade ลูกระเบิดขว้างแบบ ๘๗ "ไข่ห่าน" | No | 1935 | Fragmentation | - | Produced by the Royal Thai Army Ordnance Department. |
| Type 78 Grenade ลูกระเบิดยิงจากปืนเล็ก แบบ ๘๗ (ลย.๘๗) | Barrel attachment for Type 66 Rifle and Type 47 Carbine (ค.ปลย.๖๖ and ค.ปลส.๔๗ respectively) | 1935 | Fragmentation | - | Similar to French VB launchers. Produced by the Royal Thai Army Ordnance Department for use with Siamese Mausers. |
| Type 91 Grenade | Type 10 or Type 89 (Thai designation Type 84 Grenade Launcher เครื่องยิงลูกระเบิดแบบ ๘๔) | 1941 | Fragmentation | 530g | Improvement of Type 10 |
| Type 97 Grenade | No | 1941 | Fragmentation | 450g | Evolution of Type 91 optimized for hand-throw |

== Anti-tank guns ==
- 37mm Gun L/20 Hotchkiss Naval Gun converted to ground mount used by Royal Thai Marines. (Designated as 37/20mm Anti-Tank Gun (Short-Barreled) ปืนต่อสู้รถถัง 37/20 มม. ลำกล้องสั้น)
- Type 94 37 mm anti-tank gun used by Royal Thai Marines with designation 37mm Anti-Tank Gun (Long-Barreled)

Unconfirmed

- Bofors 37 mm M1934 anti-tank gun

== Anti-tank weapons (besides anti-tank guns) ==
- Type 97 automatic cannon (Anti-tank and Anti-Aircraft) (Thai designation Type 85 Anti-Aircraft Gun ปืนใหญ่ต่อสู้อากาศยาน แบบ ๘๕)
- Bazooka Type Weapons supplied to Free Thai Movement. Mentioned in memoirs of Khrong Chandawong and Phoui Sananikone about anti-tank weapon training by Allied agents.

Note: The photo of Thai resistance from the covert Military Police Cadets (นักเรียนนายทหารสารวัตร) program recruited from Chulalongkorn students can be seen operating with M9 Bazooka in the Chonburi area during their preparation to fight Japanese forces. However, the war ended before they could use their expertise against the Japanese and were deployed as paramilitary police force against Chinese triads in the post-war period.

== Anti-aircraft weapons ==
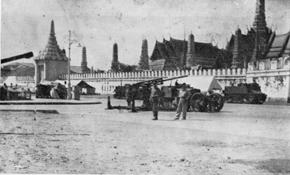
Post-War photograph of Type 77 Bofors 75mm Anti-Aircraft gun in Bangkok during 1947 Thai coup d'état. A Type 76 SPAAG could also be seen in the background.

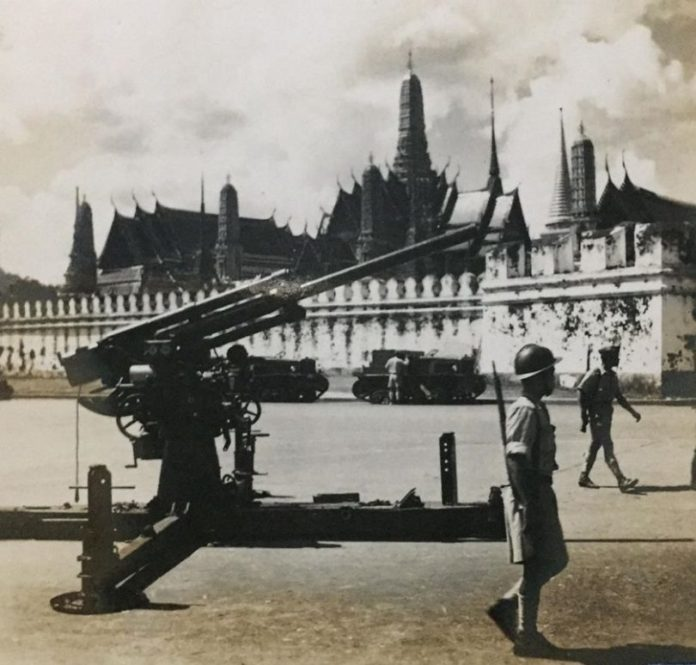
Another Post-War photograph of Type 77 Bofors 75mm Anti-Aircraft gun in Bangkok during 1947 Thai coup d'état.

=== Light anti-aircraft guns ===
- Type 80 AA Gun (Vickers .5-inch Class D) (ปืนต่อสู้อากาศยาน แบบ ๘๐)
- Madsen 20mm Maskinkanon m/38 both F7 "Universal Mount" and naval mounts.
  - Type 78 "Pre-War" Madsen 20mm
  - Type 89 "Post-War" Madsen 20mm with F7 Universal Mount.
  - Naval Mount
- Vickers Armstrongs QF 2-pounder Naval Anti-Aircraft Gun (Pom-Pom) (Mounted on Vickers Type 76 SPAAG)
- 40mm Type-Bi Japanese Vickers Pom-Pom (Mounted on RTN ships such as HTMS Sri Ayudhya)

Trials only

- Bofors 40 mm anti-aircraft gun 1 gun imported by Bofors AB into Siam for trials alongside two German-made ant-aircraft artillery systems.
- 20mm Flak 30 1 gun imported into Siam for trials alongside 40mm Bofors and another unknown anti-aircraft gun from Nazi Germany.

=== Heavy anti-aircraft guns ===
- Type 77 Bofors Luftvärnskanon m/1930 7,5cm (ปืนใหญ่ต่อสู้อากาศยาน แบบ ๗๗)

=== Searchlight ===
- Type 77 110 cm Searchlight (เครื่องไฟฉายแบบ ๗๗ ฟฉ.๗๗) bought from AB Bofors

=== Anti-aircraft targeting systems ===
- Unknown gun predictor for 75mm Type 77 Bofors Luftvärnskanon.

== Artillery ==
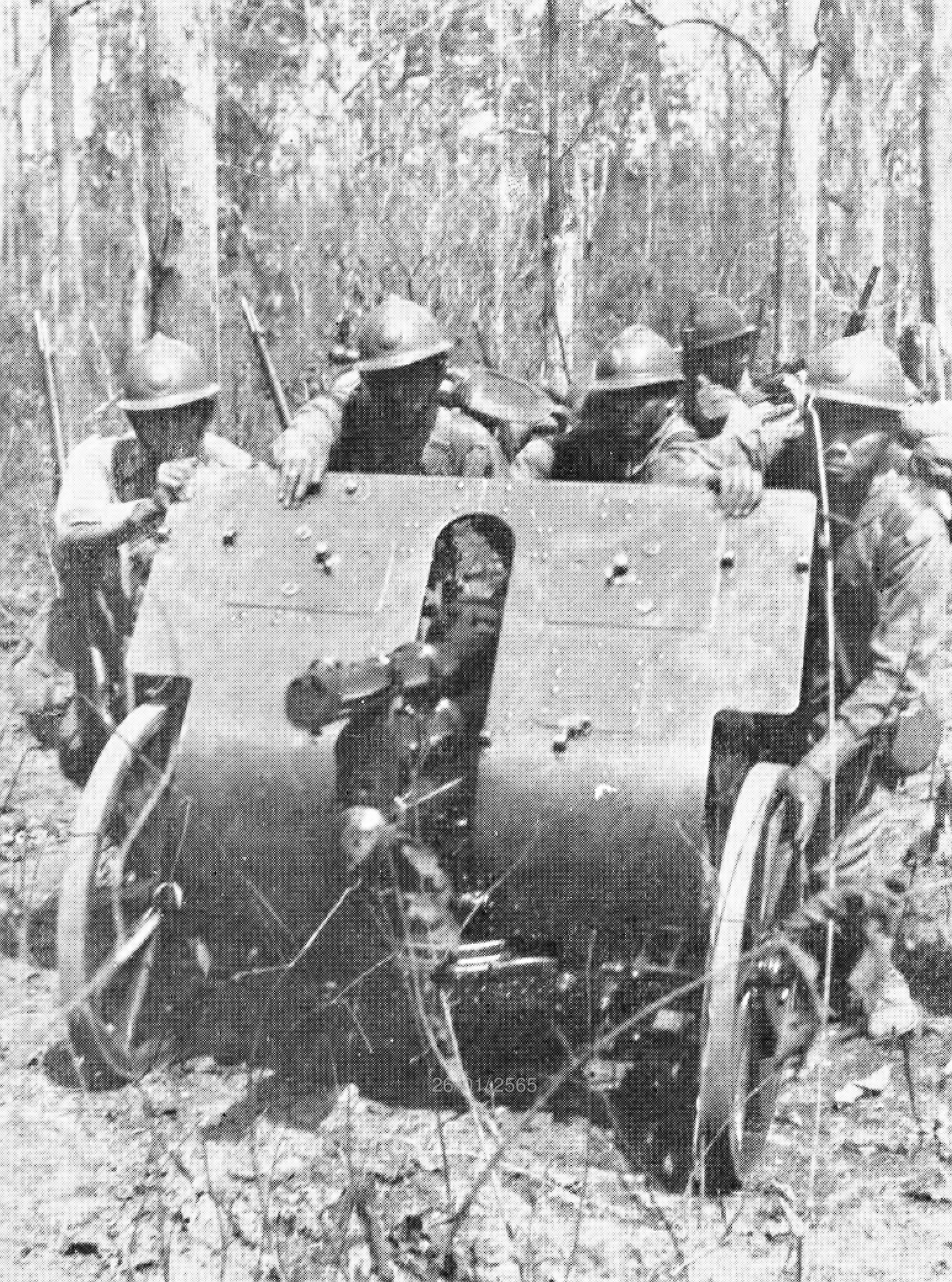
Type 77 Bofors 47/75 mm Infantry Gun used by Phayap Army in Northern Burma, 1943. Note the double barrel arrangement with upper high velocity 47mm gun and lower 75mm light howitzer

=== Infantry Mortars ===
- Japanese Type 10 grenade discharger and Type 89 grenade discharger (Designated as Type 84 Grenade Launcher เครื่องยิงลูกระเบิดแบบ ๘๔)
- Type 94 90 mm Infantry Mortar (Designated as Type 85 Grenade Launcher เครื่องยิงลูกระเบิดแบบ ๘๕)

=== Field artillery ===
- Bofors 75 mm Mountain Gun
- Type 49 50mm Krupp M1906 Mountain Gun (ปืนใหญ่ภูเขาแบบ ๔๙ ป.๔๙) (Originally designated Type R.S.125 before 1912)
- Type 51 7.5 cm Krupp Gebirgskanone M1908 Mountain Gun (ปืนใหญ่ภูเขาแบบ ๕๑ ป.๕๑) (Originally designated as Type R.S.127 before 1912, Type 1 (Long Barrel) was adopted in 1909)
- Type 51 7.5 cm Krupp Gebirgskanone M1908 Mountain Gun (ปืนใหญ่ภูเขาแบบ ๕๑ ป.๕๑) (Originally designated as Type R.S.127 before 1912, Type 2 (Short Barrel) was adopted in 1909)
- Type 63 Mountain Gun (ปืนใหญ่ภูเขาแบบ ๖๓ ป.๖๓) (Thai designation of the Japanese Type 41, which is a copy of the German 7.5 cm Gebirgskanone M1908 adopted in 1921)
- Type 77 Bofors 47/75 mm Infantry Gun (ปืนใหญ่ทหารราบ แบบ ๗๗ ป.๗๗) (adopted in 1934)
- Type 78 Bofors 10.5 cm kanon m/34 Howitzer (ปืนใหญ่หนักกระสุนวิถีราบ แบบ ๗๘ (ปนร.๗๘)) (4 adopted in 1935)
- Type 78 Bofors 150 mm Model 1931 Howitzer (ปืนใหญ่หนักกระสุนวิถีโค้ง แบบ ๗๘ (ปนค.๗๘)) (unknown amount was adopted in 1935)
- Type 80 Bofors 75 mm L/40 Field Gun (ปืนใหญ่เบากระสุนวิถีราบ แบบ ๘๐ (ปนร.๘๐)) (adopted in 1937. Imported by B.Grimm company as an agent)
- Type 80 Bofors 105 mm L/22 Light Howitzer (ปืนใหญ่เบากระสุนวิถีโค้ง แบบ ๘๐ (ปนร.๘๐)) (adopted in 1937)

== Vehicles ==
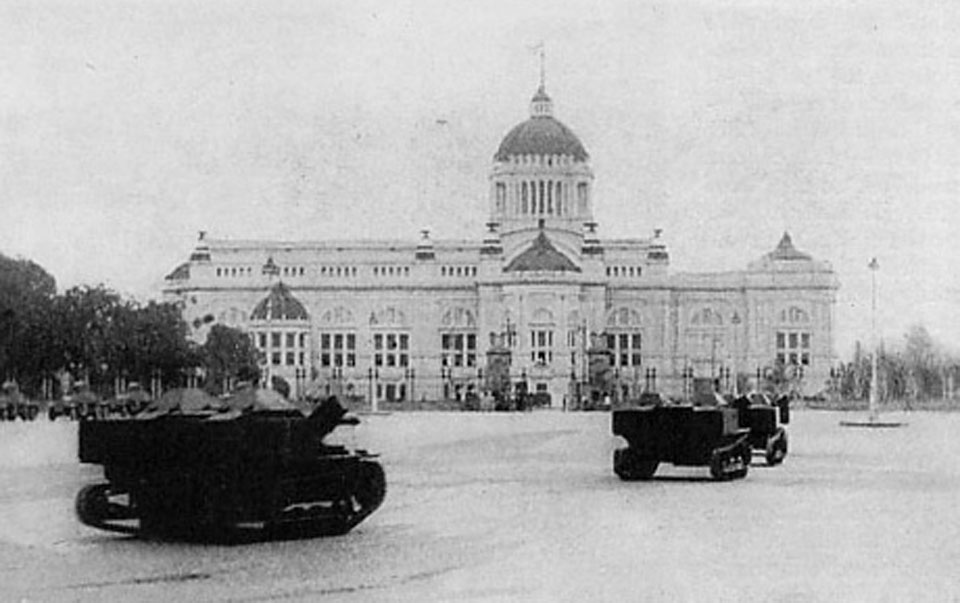
Type 73 Carden Loyd Tankettes during Siamese Revolution of 1932 seizing the Ananta Samakhom Throne Hall.

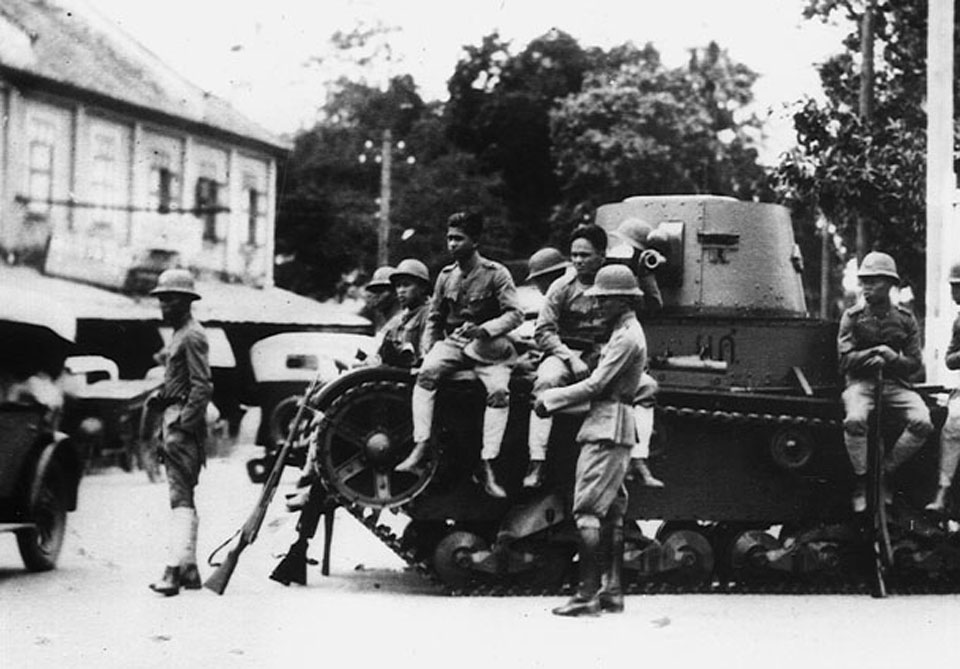
Type 76 Vickers 6-ton Mk.E during Siamese Revolution of 1932. These armored vehicles would eventually saw combat in World War II.

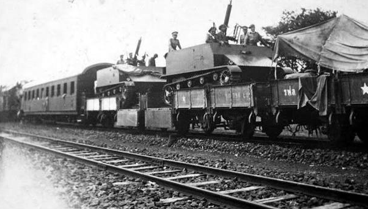
Vickers Type 76 SPAAG transported on railroad flatcars during Boworadet Rebellion of 1933.

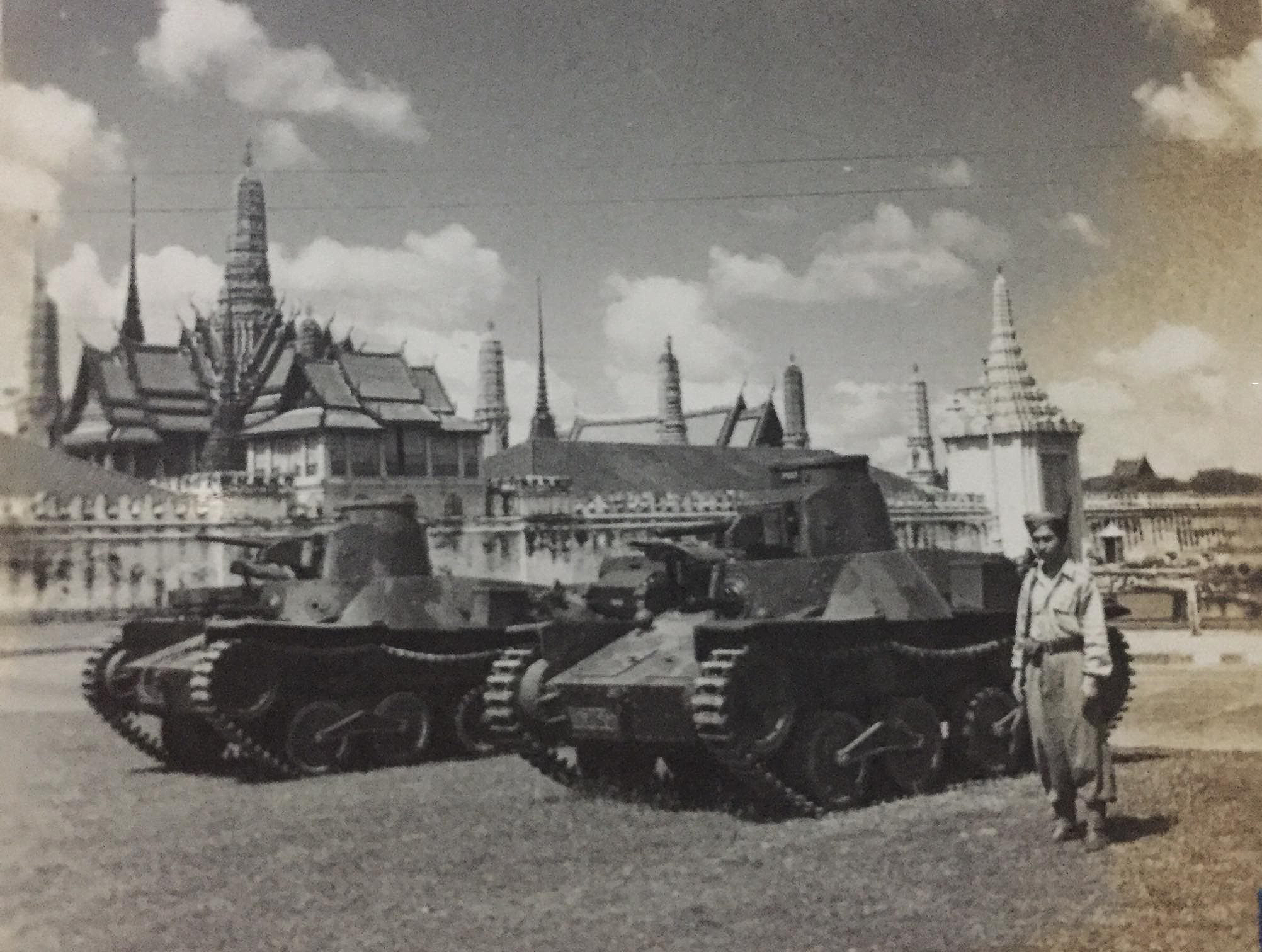
Post-War photograph of Thai Type 83 Ha-Go light tank during 1947 Coup d'état, Bangkok.

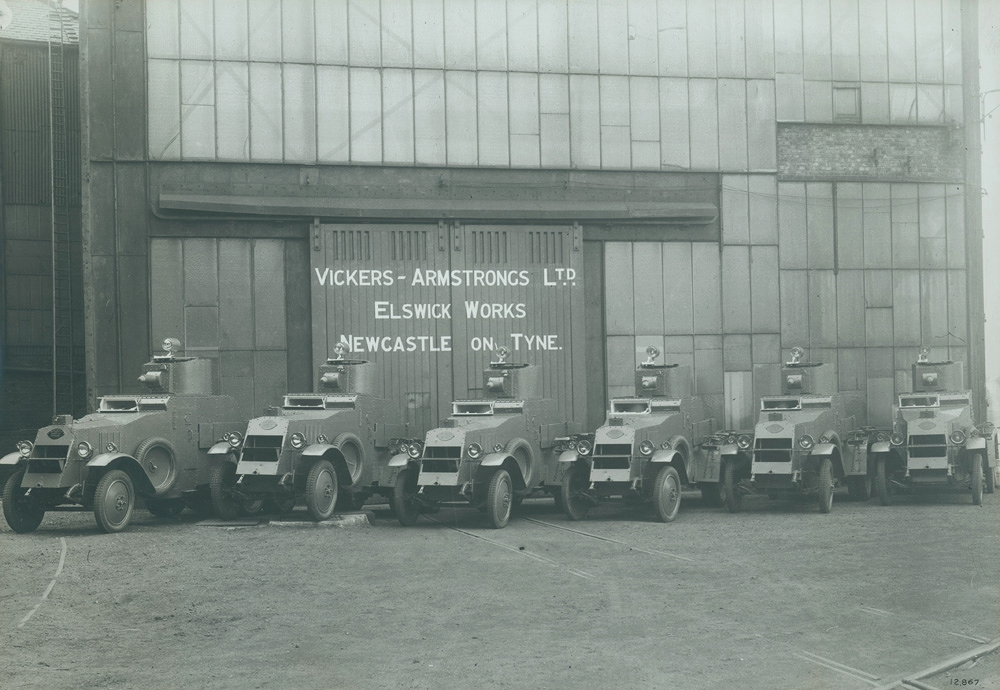
Vickers-Morris M1931 4x6 Armored Car at Elswick Works, Newcastle upon Tyne before delivery to Siam.

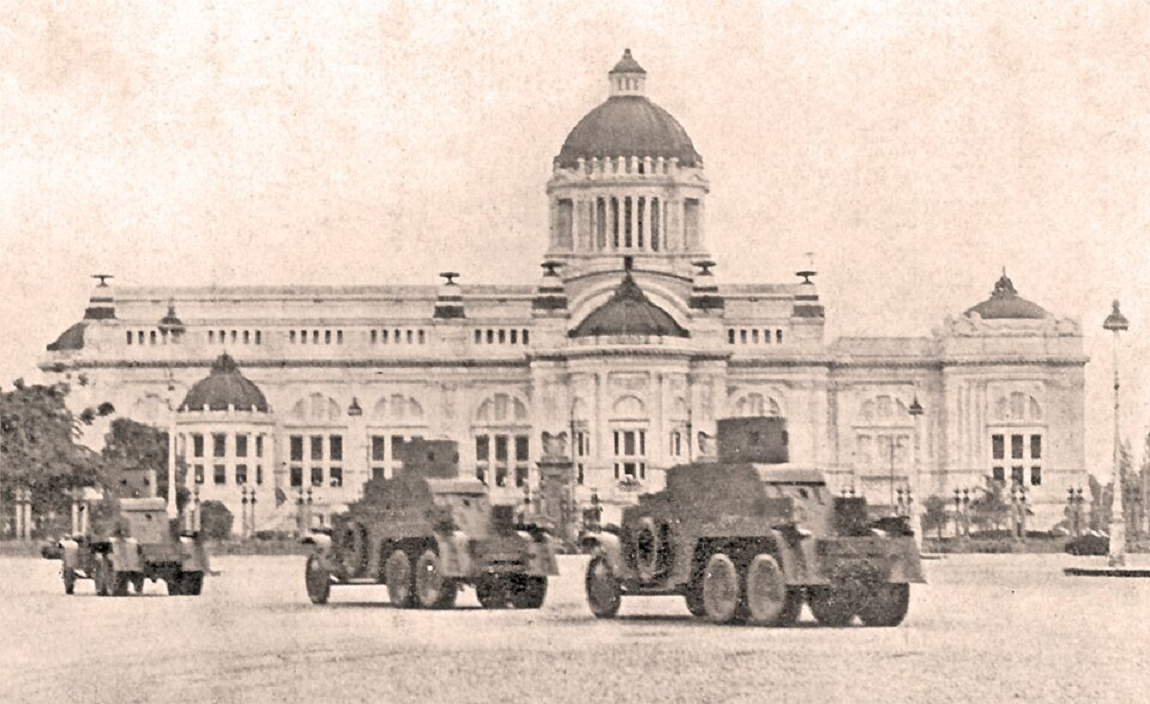
Vickers-Morris M1931 4x6 Armored Car during Siamese Revolution of 1932 seizing the Ananta Samakhom Throne Hall.

=== Trucks ===
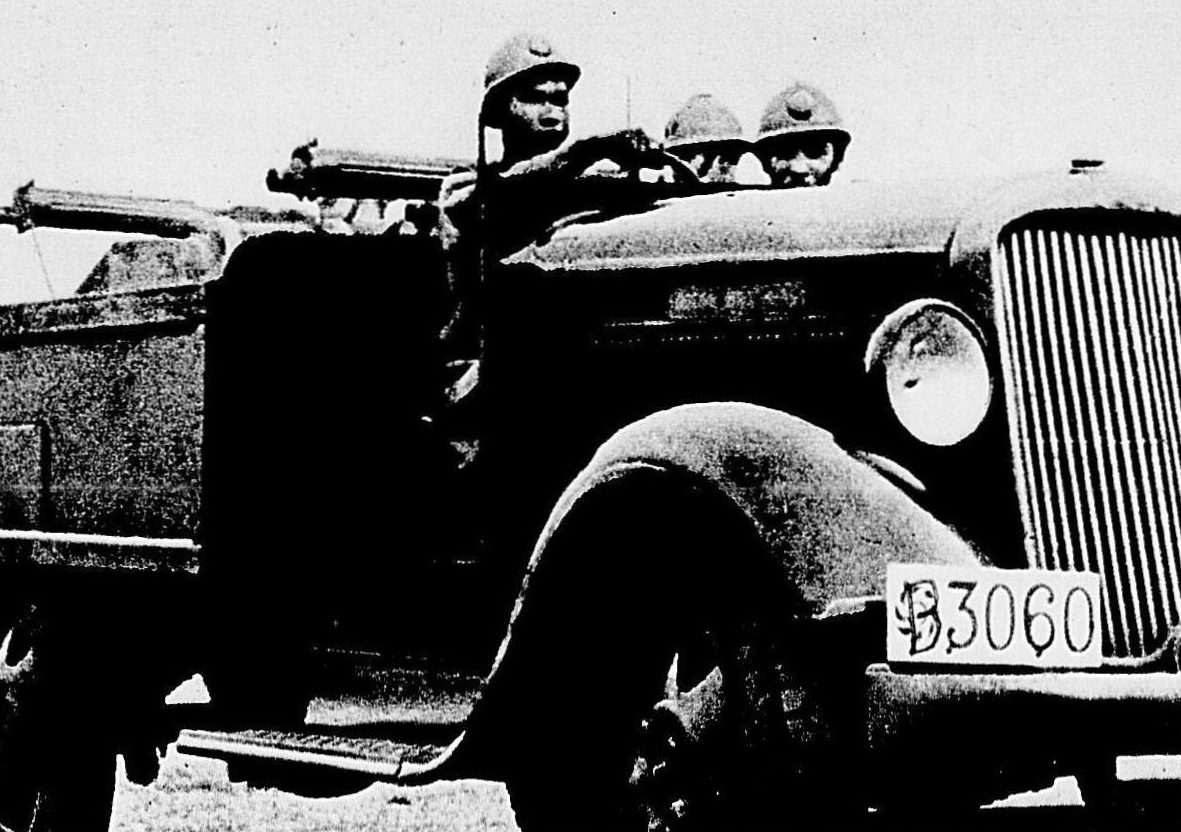
Unknown type of military truck used by Thai military. Djawa Baroe, Vol.1 Issue 16 (August 15, 1943).

- Morris 6-wheeled truck similar to Morris Commercial D Type, 30-cwt, 6 x 4, Light Lorry is seen during Thai military parade after Boworadet Rebellion. (Unknown numbers, 4+)
- Open-Topped 4-wheeled Dodge truck with Type 77 Vickers Mount is mentioned in Pratyakorn Lakhornphon's Research Thesis คณะราษฎรกับการปรับปรุงกองทัพบกไทย พ.ศ. 2475-2488 with an image taken from the book titled เจ้าฟ้าประชาธิปก ราชันผู้นิราศ.
- Unknown model of 4 wheeled trucks used as a searchlight vehicle dubbed "Rod-khom-chai" (รถโคมฉาย, searchlight truck) are seen during military parade after Franco-Thai War in 1941 photo published by Japanese Asahi Shimbun. The Searchlight used is designated as Type 77 Seachlight (เครื่องไฟฉายแบบ ๗๗, ฟฉ.๗๗)
- Unknown Chevrolet Model is seen used by chemical decontamination units in Bangkok.

=== Prime movers ===
- Type 78 Tracked Prime Mover (รถสายพานลากจูงแบบ ๗๘) Landsverk Artilleritraktor L-132

=== Armored cars ===
- Type 74 Armored Car (รถเกราะแบบ ๗๔) Vickers-Morris M1931 4x6 Armored Car (6 purchased from United Kingdom.) Nicknamed "Ai-Krong" "ไอ้โกร่ง" (Tall-ones, Tallies) by Thai crews.

=== Self-propelled guns ===
- Type 76 SPAAG (รถป.ต.อ. แบบ ๗๖) Vickers Armstrongs QF 2-pounder naval anti-aircraft gun on Vickers 6-ton tractor (Utilized Vickers Dragon Medium Mark IV chassis, 36 purchased)

=== Tankettes ===
- Type 73 Light Tank Carden-Loyd Mk VI tankette (10 imported from United Kingdom in 1930) Can be distinguished from rectangular box-shaped hull with foldable armor plates covering driver and gunner positions.
- Type 77 Light Tank Carden-Loyd Mk VI tankette (30 imported from United Kingdom in 1934) Can be distinguished from angled hull armor.

Carden-Loyd Tankettes in Thai service were nicknamed "ไอ้แอ้ด" (Ai Aed, an archaic word meaning small-ones) for their size.

=== Tanks ===
- Type 76 Tank Vickers 6-ton Mk.E Type B Light Tank (12 were imported from United Kingdom in 1933.)
- Type 76 Amphibious Tank Vickers-Carden-Loyd A4E12 Amphibious Light Tank (2 purchased from United Kingdom in 1933.)
- Type 81 Tank Vickers 6-ton Mk.E Type B Light Tank (Of 12 ordered from United Kingdom, only 8 were delivered in 1938.)
- Type 83 Tank (40 Type 95 Ha-Go were purchased from Japanese Showa Tsusho Gaisha in 1940 and delivered in 1941 together with 3,500 AP Rounds and 7,500 HE Rounds.)

Notes: Differences between Type 76 and Type 81 Vickers 6-ton can be found at their coaxial machine gun mounting. Type 76 has a slanted machine gun water jacket similar to Vickers 6-ton Mk.F while Type 81 have a more rounded tube-like water jacket.

=== Captured vehicles ===
- Renault UE Chenillette 5 were captured from French Indochina after Franco-Thai War

== Naval vessels ==
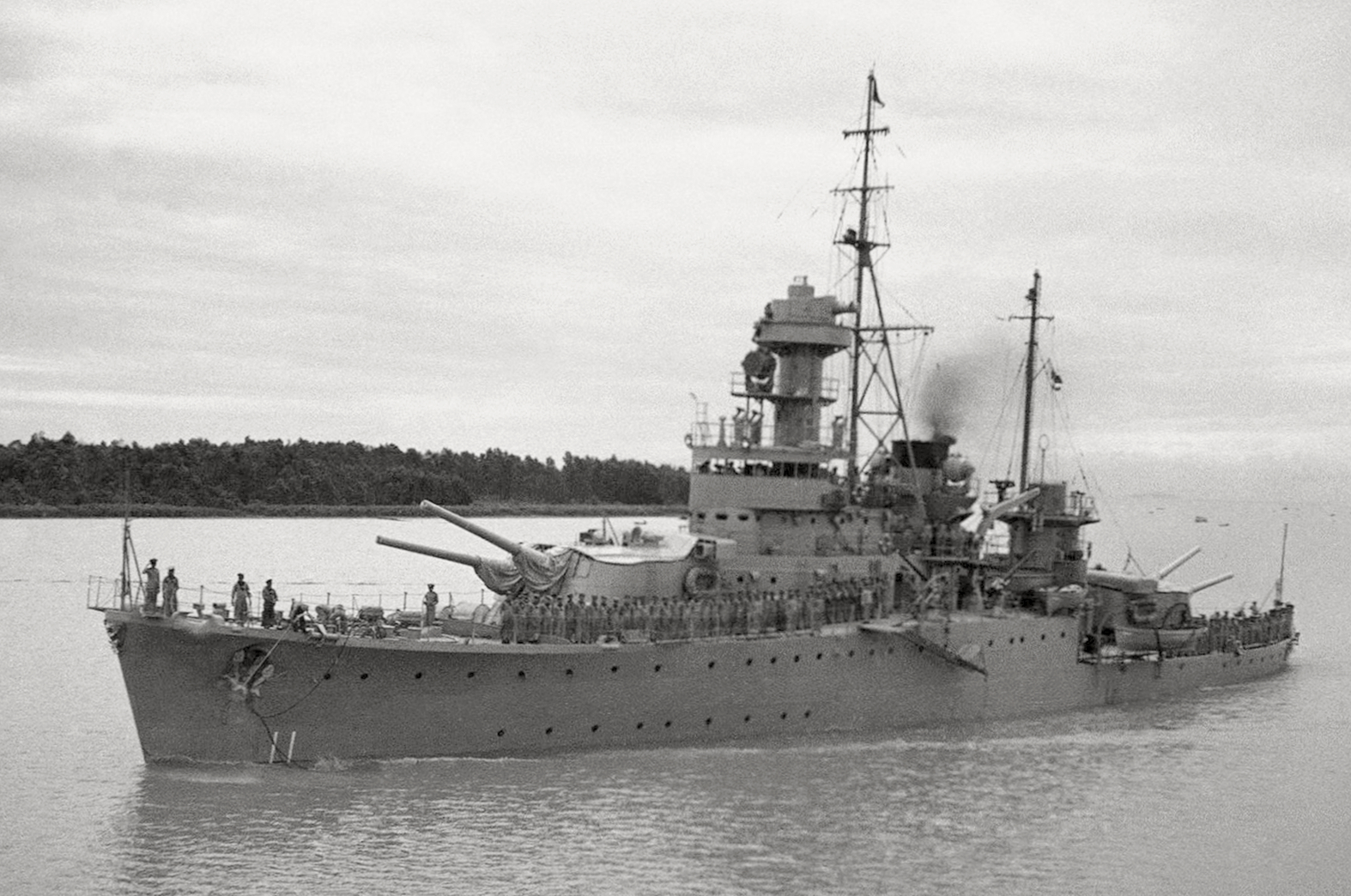
Pre-War photograph of Coastal Defense Ship HTMS Thonburi, 1938

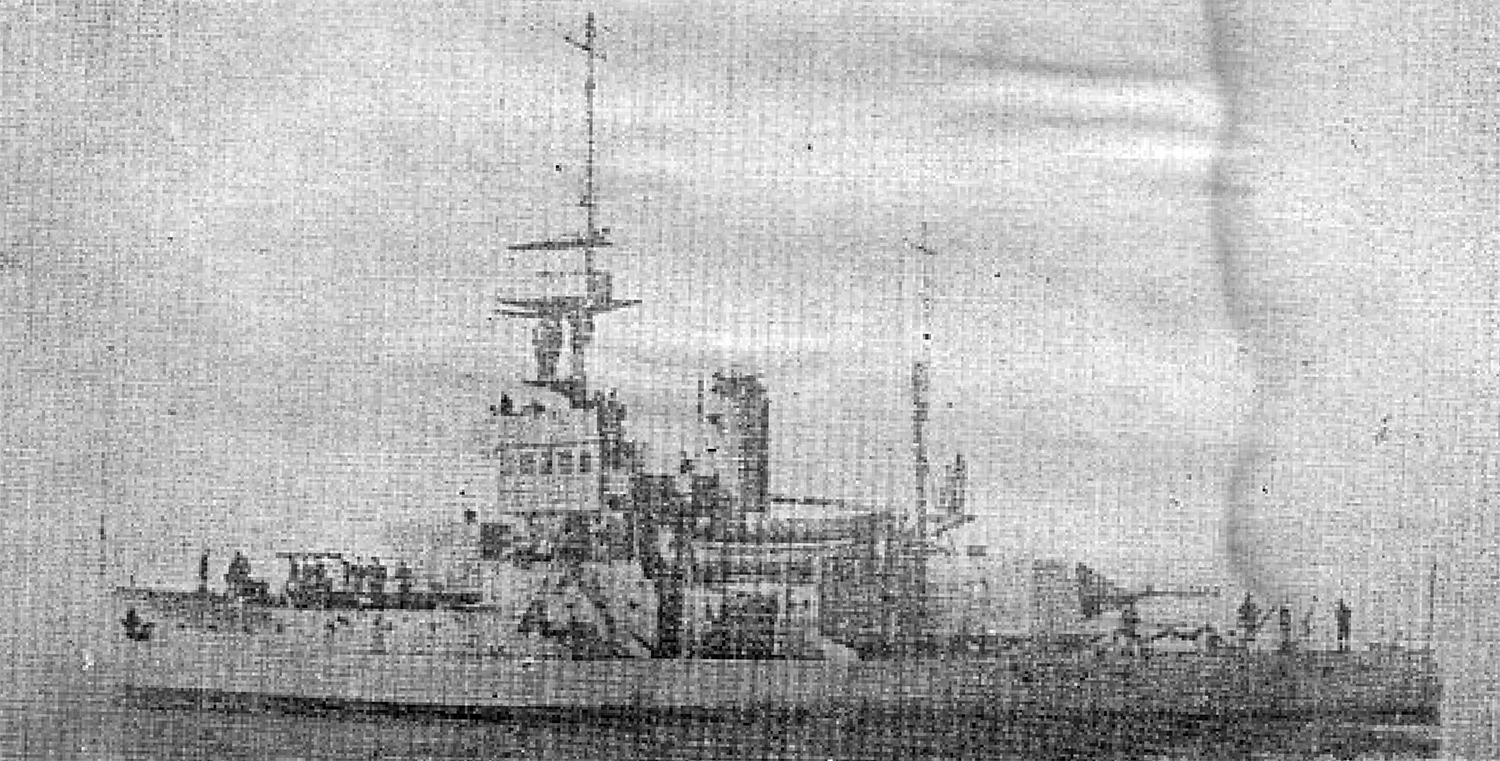
Photograph of coastal gunboat HTMS Sukhothai

=== Coastal Defence Ships ===
- Heavy Gunboat HTMS Thonburi (Heavily damaged and disabled at Battle of Ko Chang)
- Heavy Gunboat HTMS Sri Ayudhya
- Light Gunboat HTMS Rattanakosin
- Light Gunboat HTMS Sukhothai

=== Destroyers and Large Torpedo Boats ===
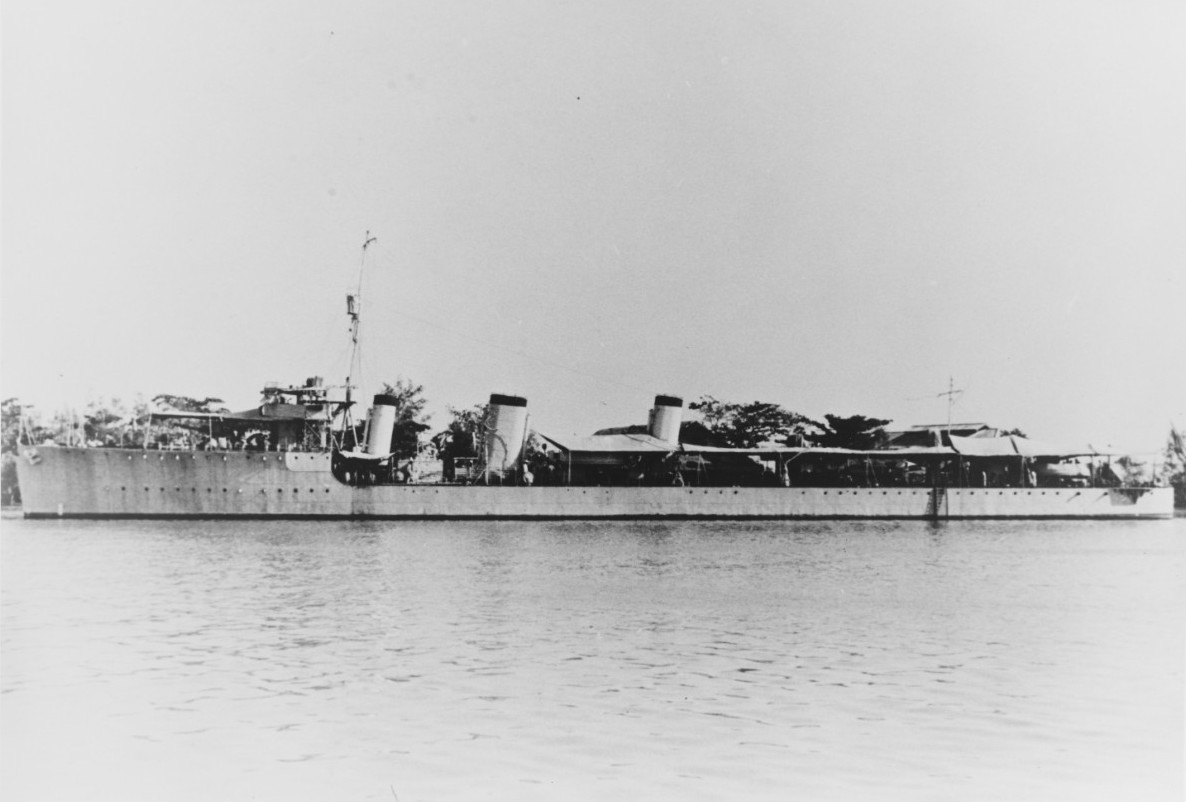
HTMS Phra Ruang at Bangkok, November 1955.

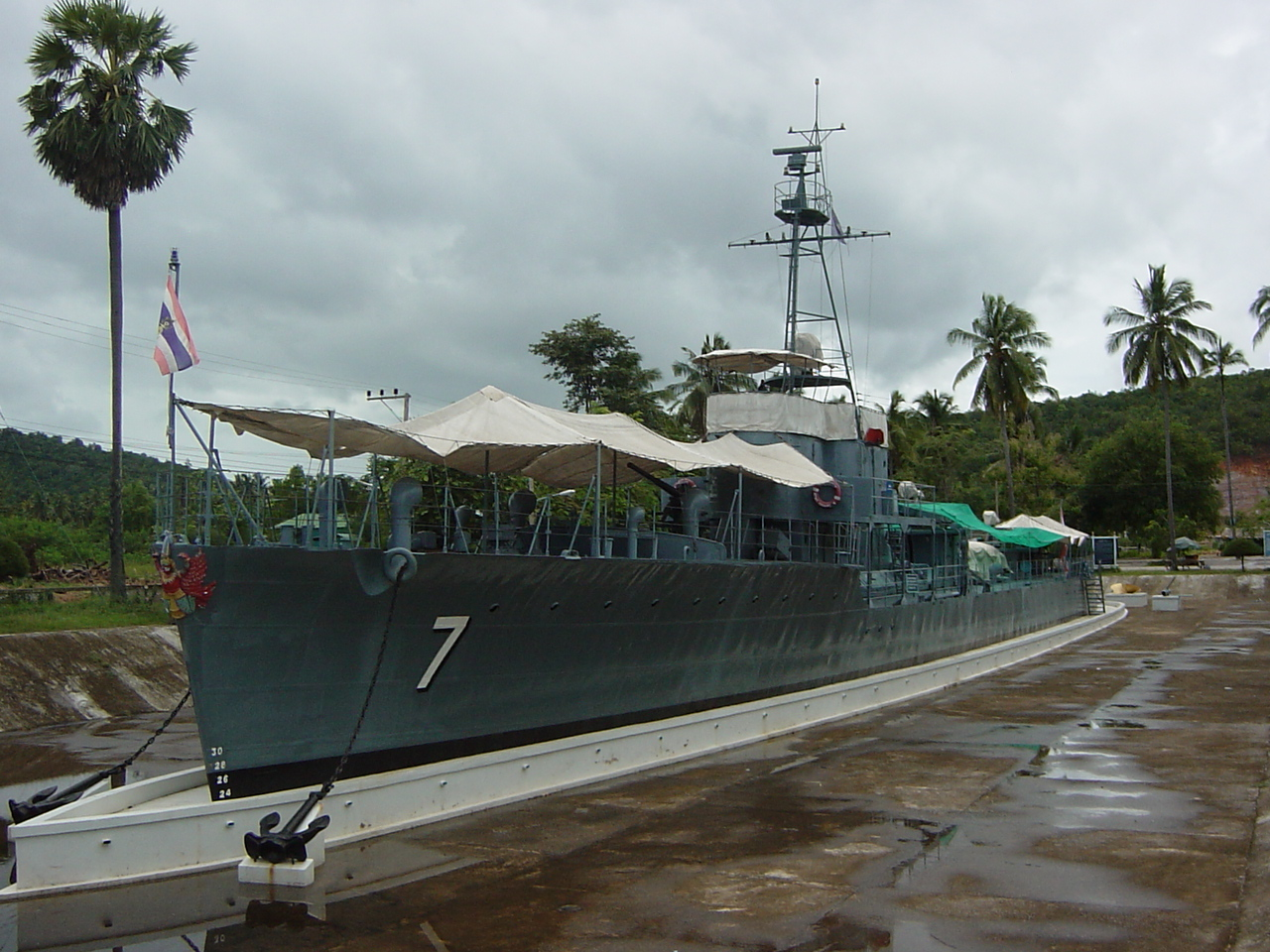
Surviving Trad-Class Torpedo Boat HTMS Chumphon as monument.

R-Class Destroyer

- HTMS Phra Ruang (Ex-HMS Radiant (1916))

Trad Class Torpedo Boat Destroyer

- HTMS Trad (1935)
- HTMS Phuket (1935)
- HTMS Chantaburi (1938)
- HTMS Chonburi (1938) (Sunk at Battle of Ko Chang)
- HTMS Chumphon (1938)
- HTMS Pattani (1938)
- HTMS Rayong (1938)
- HTMS Songhkla (1938) (Sunk at Battle of Ko Chang)
- HTMS Surasdra (1938)

=== Torpedo patrol boats ===
- HTMS Khlong Yai
- HTMS Tak Bai
- HTMS Kantang

=== Coastal motor boats ===
- Thornycroft Coastal Motor Torpedo Boats Ror-Yor-For 6 to 11, ร.ย.ฝ.6-11 (เรือยนต์ตอร์ปิโด ยามฝั่ง) (Ordered from United Kingdom)
- Royal Thai Naval Dockyard 16-tonne Coastal Patrol Boats Tor.1-6, ต.1-6 (เรือตรวจฝั่ง) Class armed with 20mm Madsen Cannon (1941-1945)

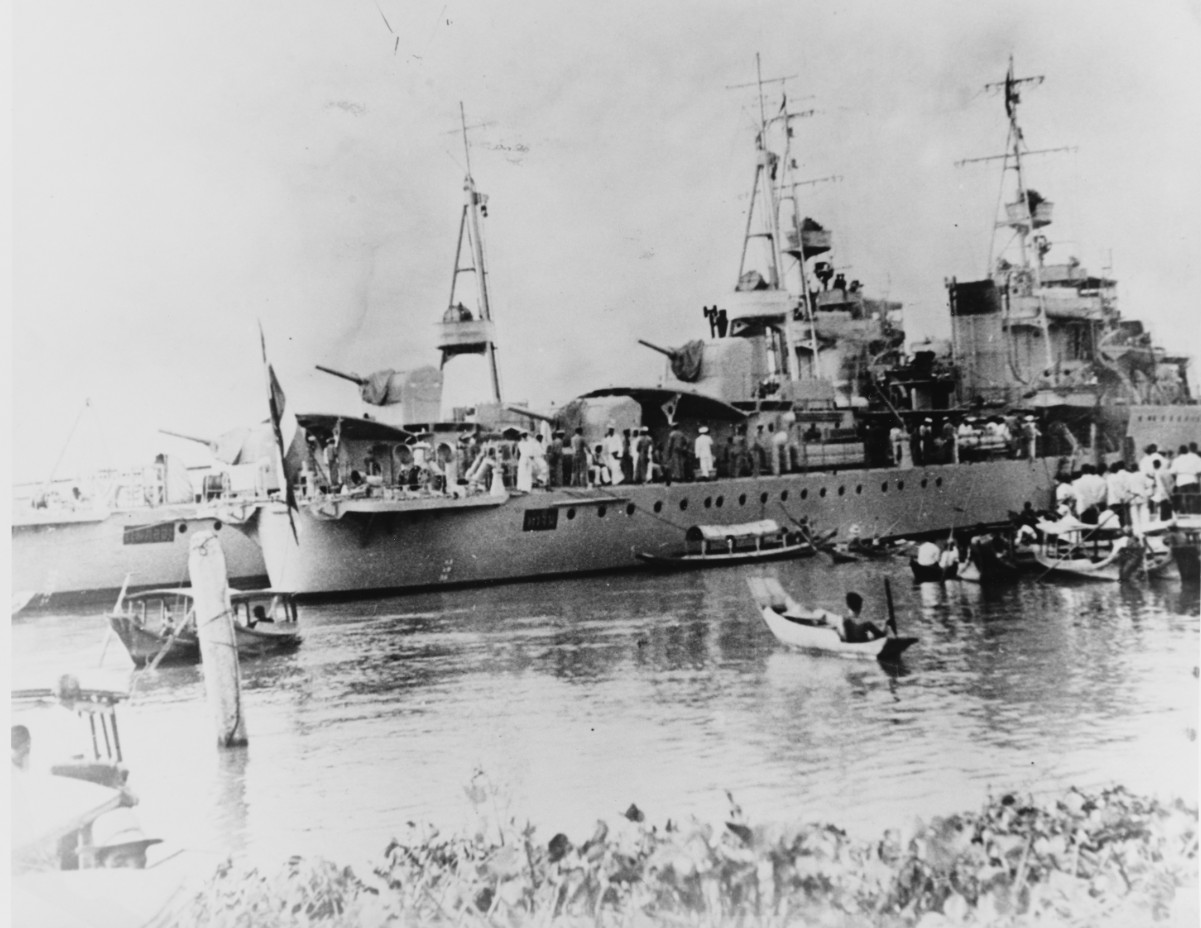
Sloops HTMS Tachin and HTMS Maeklong.

=== Sloops ===
- HTMS Mae Klong (Tachin class)
- HTMS Tachin (Tachin class)

=== Light cruisers ===
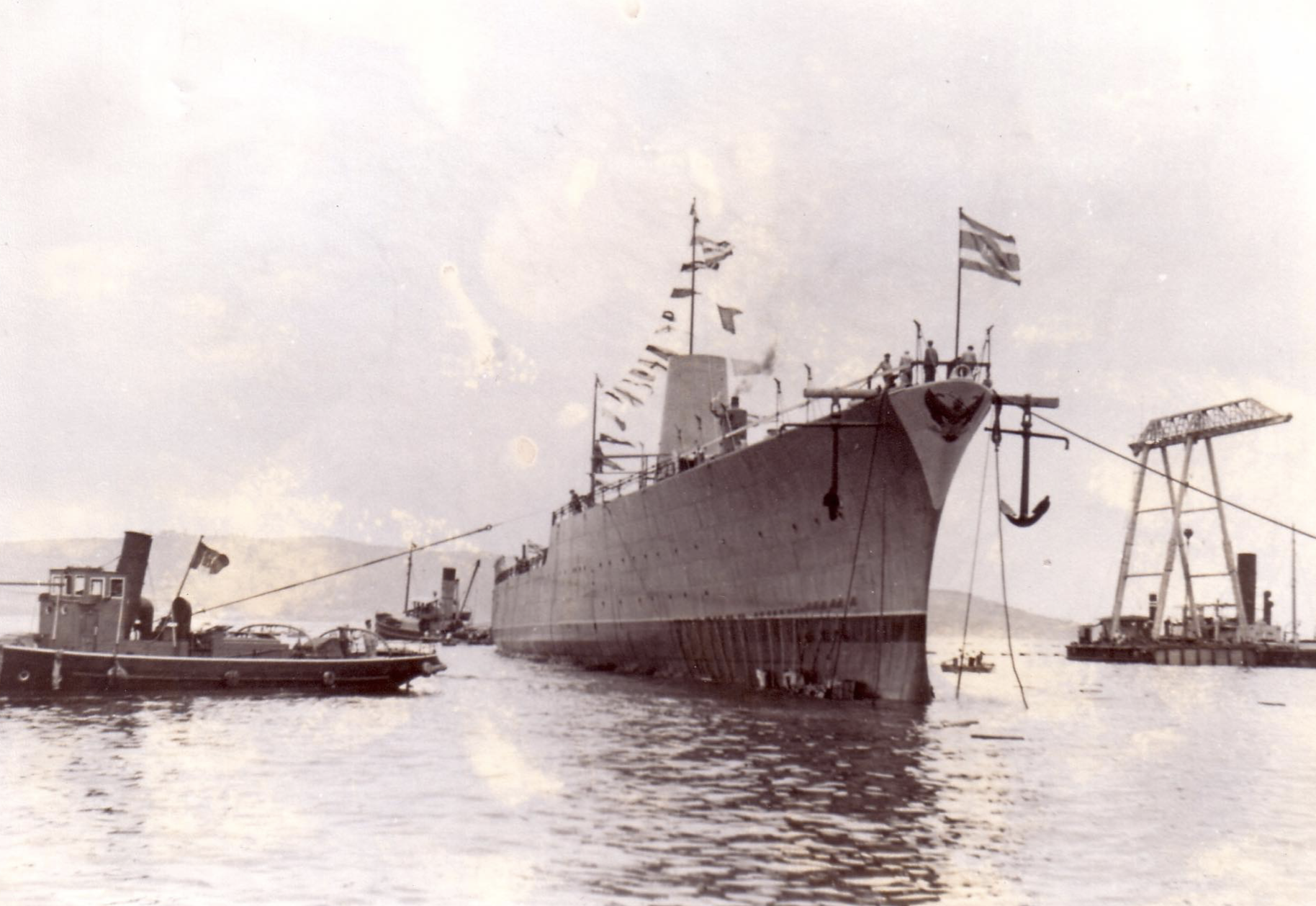
Incomplete HTMS Naresuan at Cantieri Riuniti dell'Adriatico (C.R.D.A), Trieste

- HTMS Taksin uncompleted hull requisitioned by Regia Marina as Etna, abandoned after Armistice of Cassibile
- HTMS Naresuan uncompleted hull requisitioned by Regia Marina as Vesuvio, abandoned after Armistice of Cassibile

=== Submarines ===
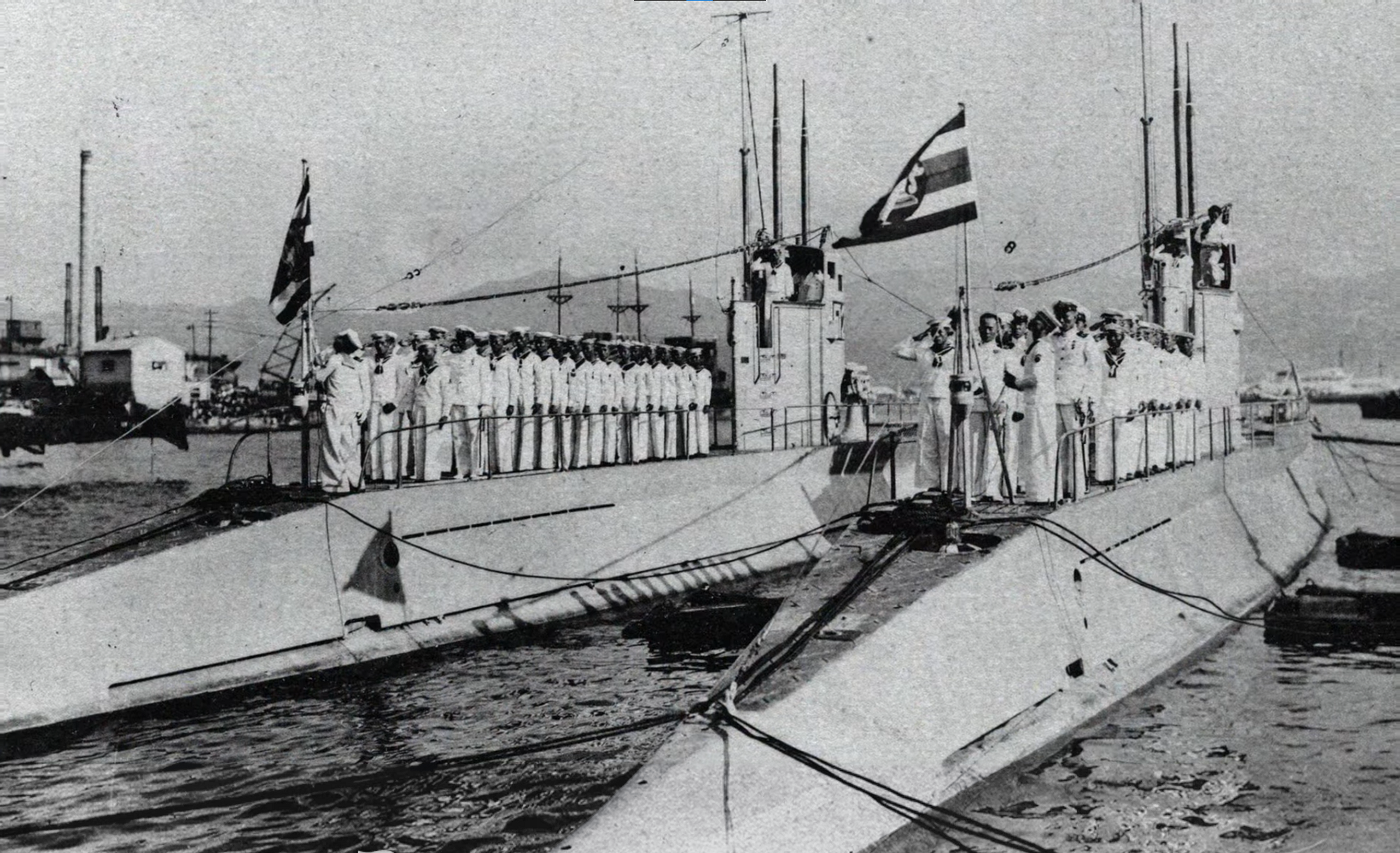
HTMS Matchanu and HTMS Wirun, Kobe Port, 1938

- HTMS Matchanu
- HTMS Phlai Chumpon
- HTMS Sinsamut
- HTMS Wirun

=== Support vessels ===
- HTMS Bang Rachan Minelayer
- HTMS Nhong Sarhai Minelayer
- HTMS Sarasin Fishery Protection Ship (Sunk by British aircraft)
- HTMS Thiew Uthok Fishery Protection Ship
- HTMS Trawenwari Fishery Protection Ship
- HTMS Samui Fuel Tanker and Training Ship (Sunk by US Submarine USS Sealion (SS-315) in 1945 near Kapas Island during her fuel transport mission from Syonan)
- HTMS Angthong (Previously royal yacht Mahachakri (2) pressed into service as military support ship) (Sunk by British bombers)
- HTMS Chang Troopship (Famous for saving HTMS Thonburi after the Battle of Ko Chang)
- HTMS Sichang Troopship
- HTMS Phangan Troopship
- HTMS Khram Support Ship (Confiscated from German Empire during WWI)
- HTMS Kood Support Ship (Confiscated from German Empire during WWI)
- HTMS Samet Support Ship / Tugboat (Confiscated from German Empire during WWI)
- HTMS Chuang Wooden Tugboat
- HTMS Boriphanpahol (Rechristened to HTMS Kledkaew in December 1941) Support Ship
- HTMS Thalang Support Ship (Sunk in 1945 at Phuket but later raised and served as weather station ship post-war, renamed as HTMS Suriya in 1950.)

=== Training Ship ===
- HTMS Chaophraya (Ex-HMS Havant (1919))

== Aircraft ==
Last surviving example of Curtiss Hawk III (บ.ข.๑๐) fighter at Royal Thai Air Force Museum.

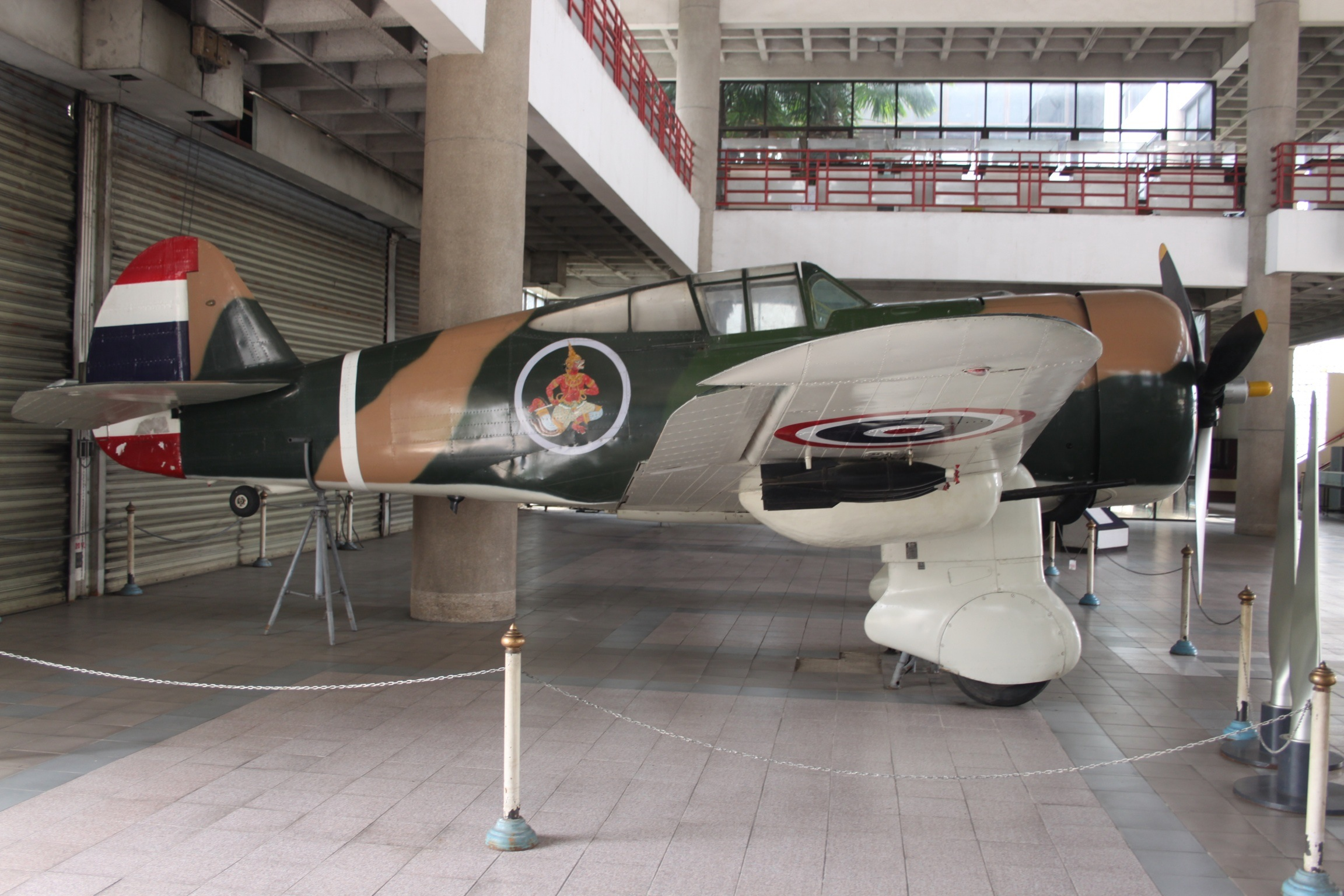
Example of Hawk 75N (บ.ข.๑๒) at Royal Thai Air Force Museum. The aircraft have been fitted with Madsen cannon underwing gondola mounts.

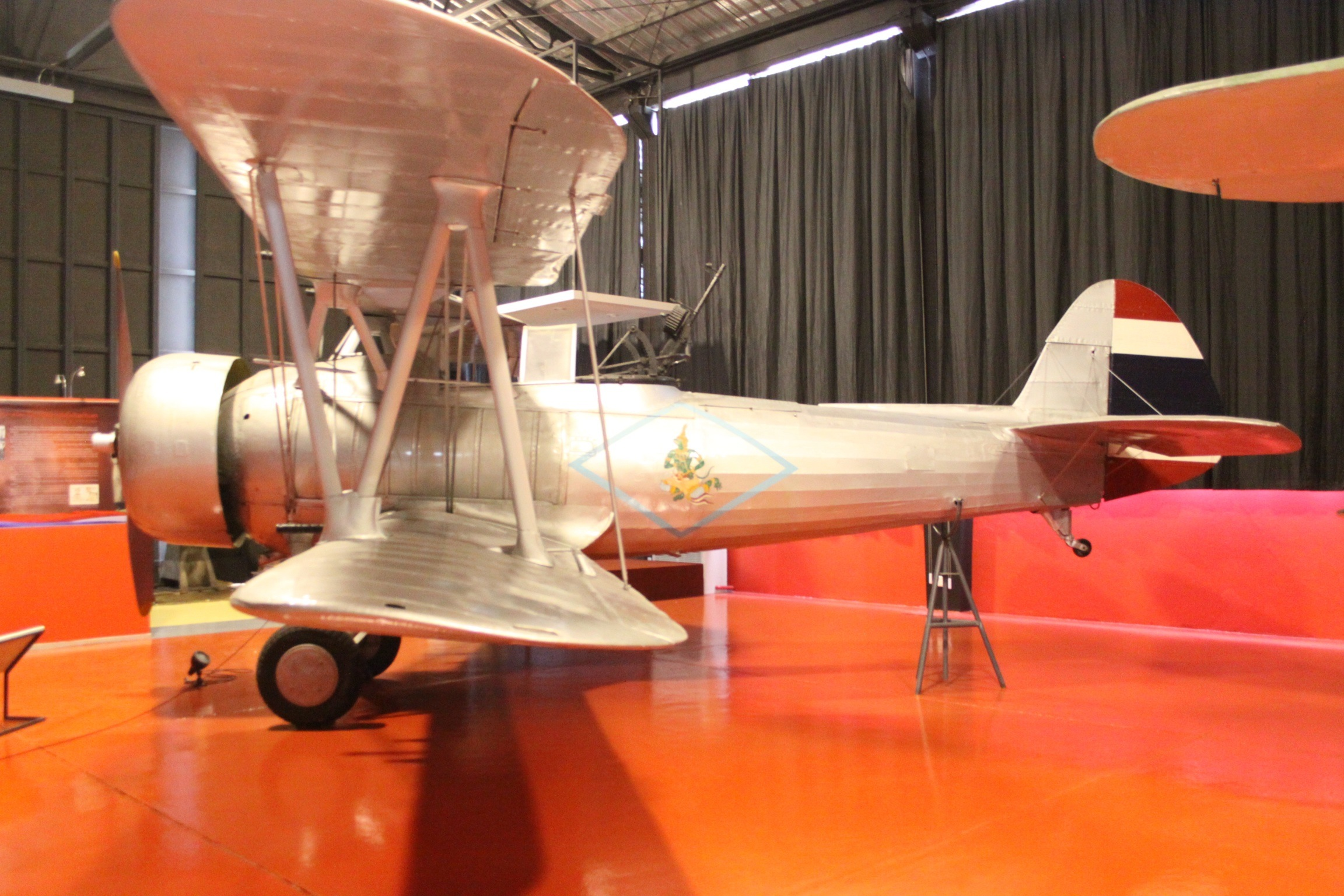
Last surviving example of Vought V-93S Corsair (บ.จ.๑) at Royal Thai Air Force Museum.

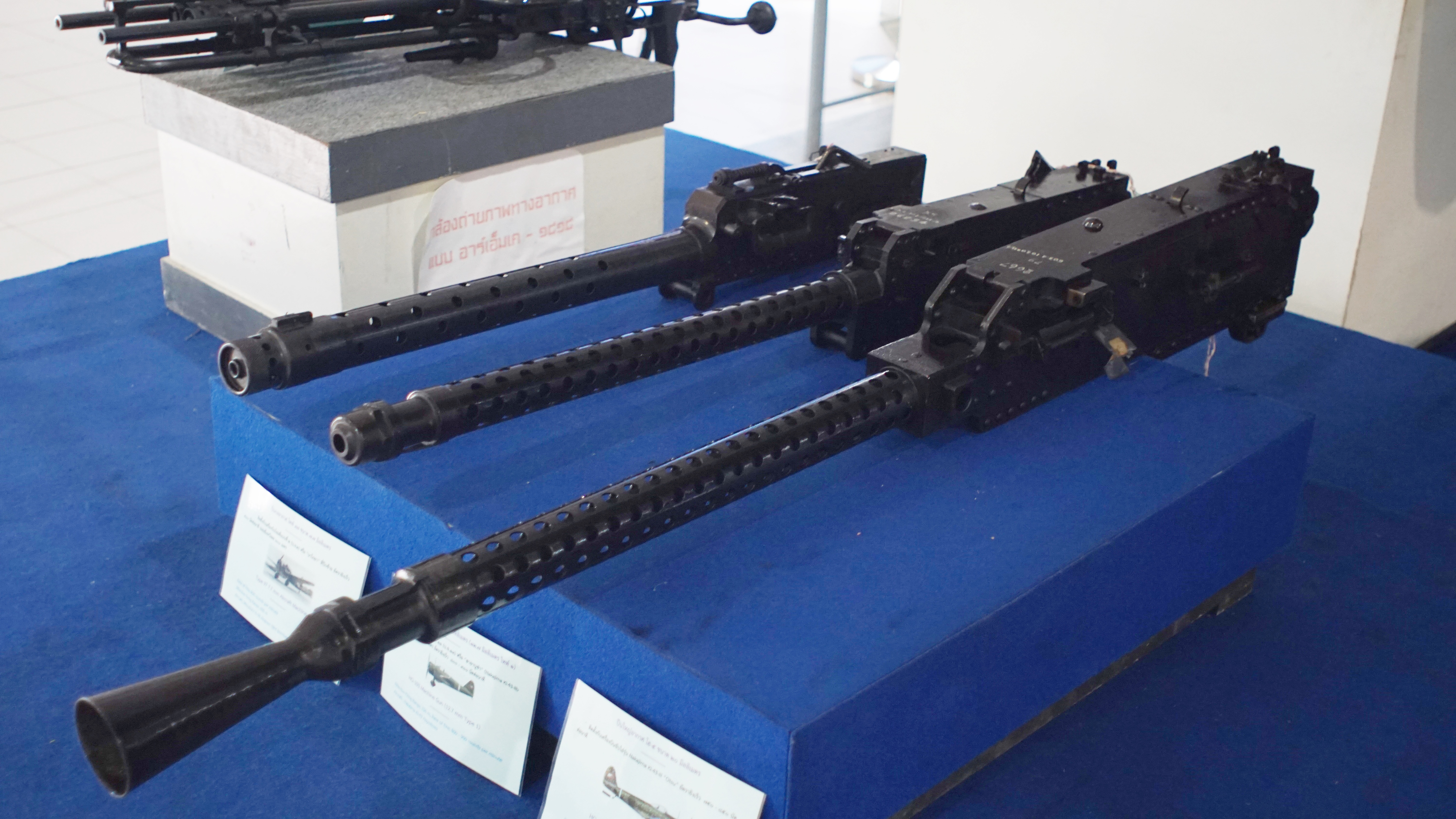
Surviving Japanese aircraft armaments at Royal Thai Air Force Museum.

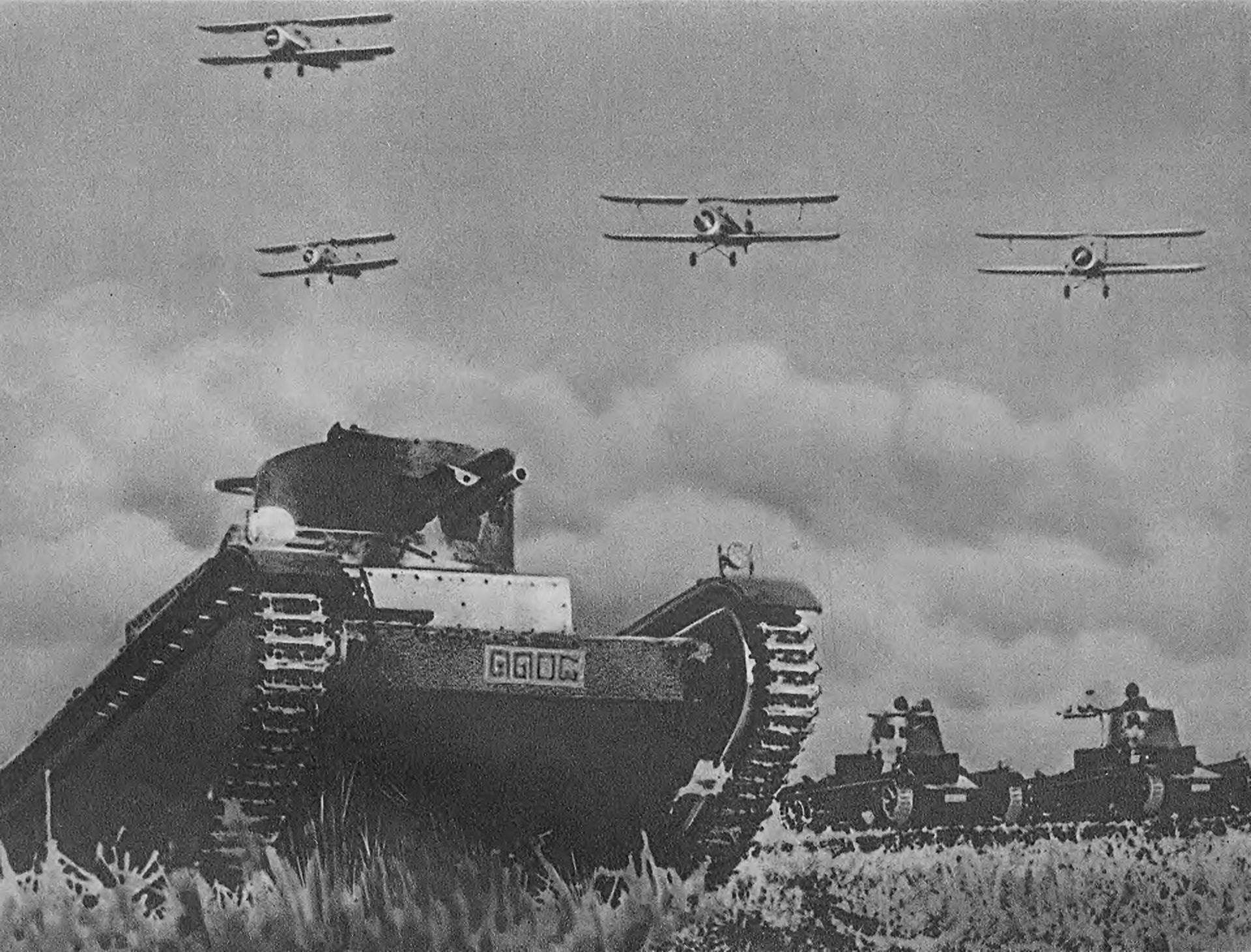
Vought V-93S Corsair and Vickers 6-ton during military exercise, 1935.

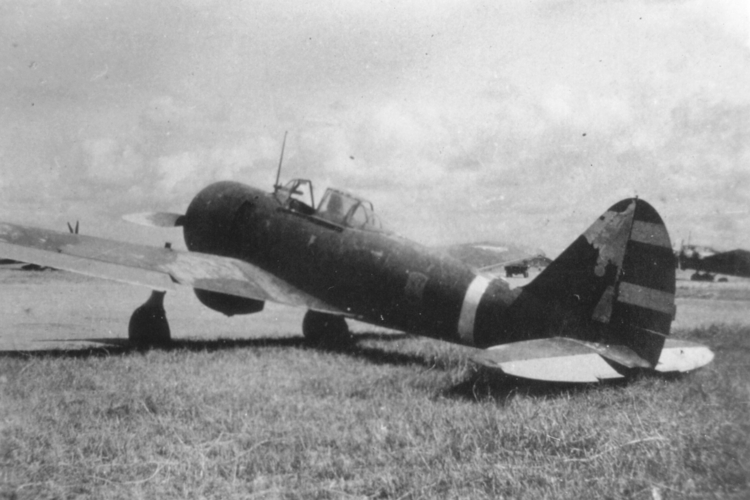
Thai Nakajima Ki-27b Otsu (บ.ข.๑๒) fighter

=== Fighter Aircraft ===
- Curtiss Hawk II (Thai designation Type 9 Fighter บ.ข.๙) (12 were ordered from United States in 1933 and received in 1934)
- Curtiss Hawk III (Thai designation Type 10 Fighter บ.ข.๑๐) (12 were delivered from United States in 1935 and another 12 in December 1935 batch. 50 more were manufactured locally.)
- Curtiss Hawk 75N (Thai designation Type 11 Fighter บ.ข.๑๑) (Simplified P-36 with non-retractable landing gear. 12 units were delivered to Royal Thai Air Force. Some airframes were fitted with 23mm Madsen cannons in underwing gondola mounts.)
- Nakajima Ki-27b Otsu (Thai designation Type 12 Fighter บ.ข.๑๒) (12 delivered in January 1942) Thai ground crews gave Ki-27 nicknames such as "Nokkrajok" (Sparrow) and "Ota" from Nakajima Ota Plant in Gunma Prefecture despite the origins of the Thai planes from Manchurian Mansyū Aircraft production line.
- Nakajima Ki-43-IIb (Thai designation Type 13 Fighter บ.ข.๑๓) (24 delivered in 1943 from Japanese base at Singapore)

=== Bomber Aircraft ===
- Martin 139WSM/WH-1/166 (Thai designation Type 3 Bomber บ.ท.๓) (6 Martin 139WSM bombers received from USA in 1937 bolstered by 9 ex-Dutch aircraft of Martin 139WH-1 and Martin 166 types given by Japan in 1943.)
- Mitsubishi Ki-21-I (Thai designation Type 4 Bomber บ.ท.๔) (9 delivered by Japanese in 1940-1941. Never participated in Franco-Thai War but saw action during Burma Campaign.)

=== Attack Aircraft ===
- Vought V93S Corsair (Thai designation Type 1 Attack Aircraft บ.จ.๑)
- Mitsubishi Ki-30 (Thai designation Type 2 Attack Aircraft บ.จ.๒) (24 aircraft delivered between November–December 1940) Nicknamed "Nagoya" from Mitsubishi Factory in Nagoya, Japan

=== Trainer Aircraft ===
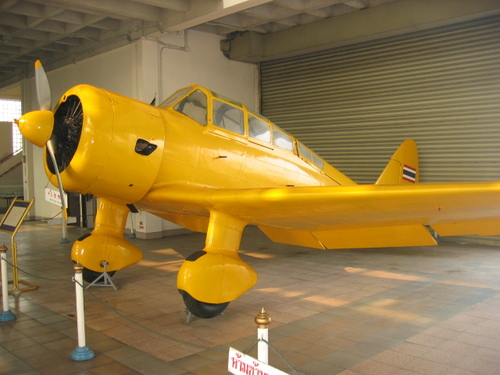
One of the surviving Ki-55 Trainer at Royal Thai Air Force Museum

- Avro 504N (Trainer aircraft, 20 imported in 1930, 50 locally produced. Designated as Type 4 Trainer or บ.ฝ.๔) 2 loaned to Royal Thai Navy to be converted as seaplanes with floats
- Vought V93S Corsair (12 bought on 30 March 1933 (9 V-93S, 3 V-93SA), 25 built locally in 1936, 50 more built locally in 1940, locally designated as Type 18 (บฝ.๑๘) and 18 A (บฝ.๑๘ ก.) Trainers but also received Type 1 Attack Aircraft บ.จ.๑ designation)
- Tachikawa Ki-55 (24 purchased in 1942, locally designated as Type 6 Trainer บ.ฝ.๖)

=== Naval Aircraft ===
Watanabe WS-103S seaplane used by the Royal Thai Navy. RTN roundel is a circular disk with an anchor.

- Avro 504N (2 Aircraft on loan from Royal Thai Air Force fitted with floats.)
- Watanabe WS.103S (Seaplane, ordered in 1936 6 imported in May 1938. Thai designation Type 1 Navy Aircraft / บ.รน.๑) In service with Royal Thai Navy and served on-board HTMS Maeklong , HTMS Tachin and a detachment at Sattahip
- Nakajima E8N (Seaplane, 18 imported) In service with Royal Thai Navy as Type 2 Navy Aircraft / บ.รน.๒
- Aichi E13A1 Model 11 (Observation seaplane, 6 in service with Royal Thai Navy as Type 3 Navy Aircraft / บ.รน.๓ ) (Often mistaken as A6M for the same Japanese Type 0 designation)

=== Miscellaneous ===
- North American NA-68 6 aircraft (Sel.No.41-19082 to 41-19087) ordered from North American in 1939 with license production for total amount of 100 was planned but cancelled when the aircraft was interned at Hawaii in October 1940 due to US arms embargo and fear of losing US made aircraft to Japanese-aligned Siam during the ongoing Franco-Thai War. Used by US Army Air Corps for training at Luke Field, Arizona as P-64.
- North American NA-69 10 aircraft (Sel.No.41-18890 to 18899) interned by the US Army Air Corps in October 1940 and diverted to Nichols Field, Philippines with US designation A-27. All aircraft destroyed during the Japanese Invasion.
- Bristol Blenheim Considered as reinforcement for few Martin bombers in service after the events of Boworadet Rebellion but delivery and license production agreement cancelled in 1940. Thai military aviation historian Thammawat Rattanavijarn suggested that one demonstration aircraft crashed at Songkhla before World War II hostilities began while other airframes were diverted to squadrons in British Malaya.

== See also ==
- List of common World War II infantry weapons
- Thailand in World War II
- Franco-Thai War
- Japanese invasion of Thailand
- Phayap Army
- Free Thai Movement
