= Type 35 rifle =

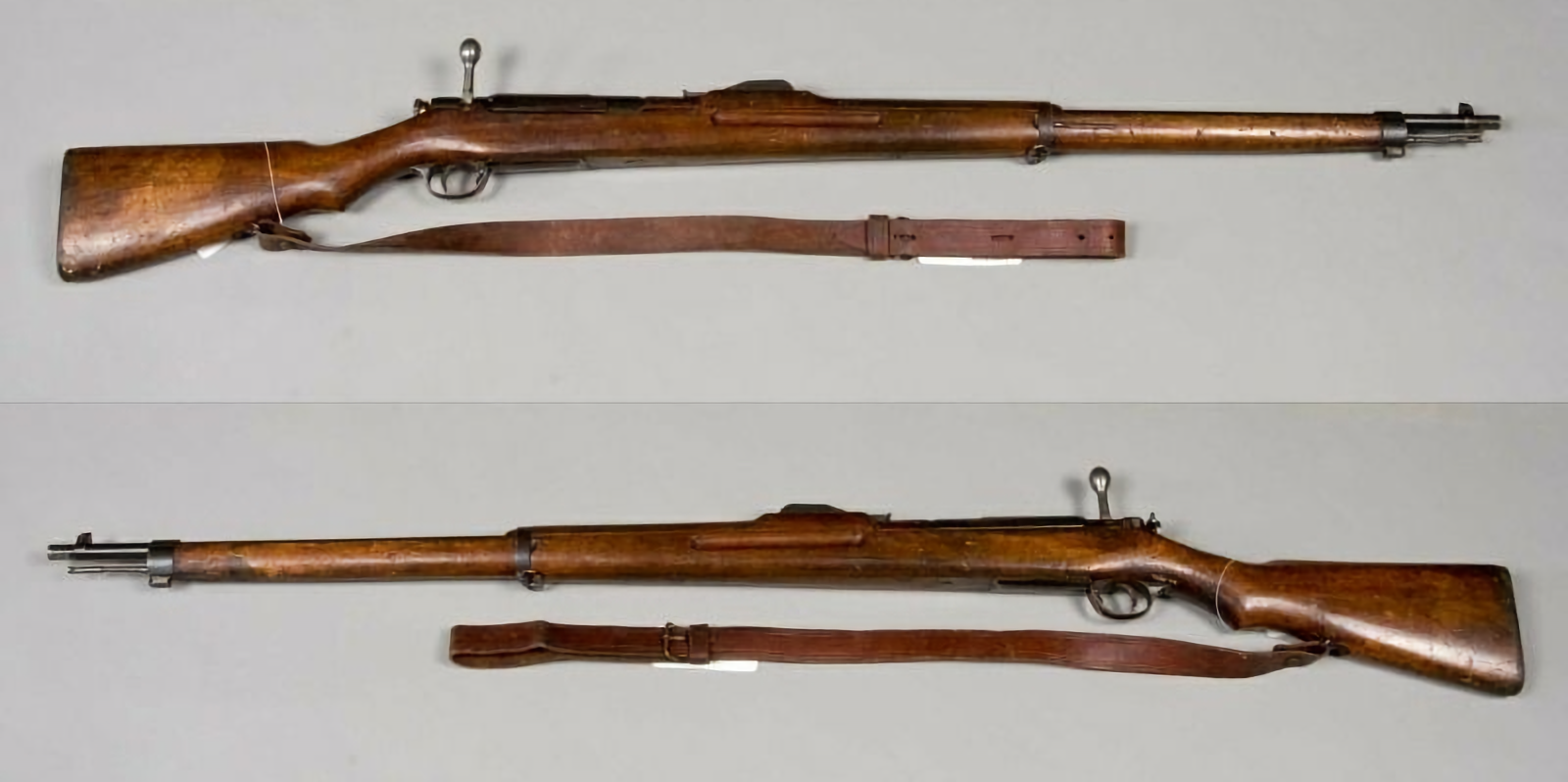
- Type: Service rifle
- Place of origin: Empire of Japan

Service history
- In service: 1902–1945 (Japan)
- Used by: See Users
- Wars: World War I Spanish Civil War; World War II; Chinese Civil War; Indonesian National Revolution; Malayan Emergency; Korean War; First Indochina War; Vietnam War

Production history
- Designed: 1902
- Produced: 1902–1905
- No. built: approximately 38,200
- Variants: Type Hiroki sub-caliber training device, 02-45

Specifications
- Mass: 4.2 kg (9 lb 4 oz)
- Length: 1,273 mm (50.1 in)
- Barrel length: 797 mm (31.4 in)
- Cartridge: 6.5×50mm Arisaka
- Action: Bolt action
- Rate of fire: 10–15 rpm
- Muzzle velocity: 765 m/s (2,510 ft/s)
- Feed system: 5-round internal magazine

The Type 35 rifle (三十五年式) was created from the Type 30 rifle for the Imperial Japanese Navy as a replacement for their aging Type 22 Murata rifles and to try to correct the deficiencies of the Type 30. The 35 referred to the adoption date, the Year 35 (1902) in the Meiji period according to the Japanese calendar.

== History ==
Not long after the Imperial Japanese Army adopted the Type 30 rifle, the Imperial Japanese Navy realized they needed a modern rifle to replace their obsolete Type 22 Murata rifles currently in use by their Special Naval Landing Forces. Furthermore, the Tokyo Artillery Arsenal stopped manufacturing the black powder in use by the 8mm Murata cartridge. Army Captain Kijirō Nambu of the Tokyo Artillery Arsenal was appointed leader of the commission assigned correct the issues of the Type 30 rifle that had arisen in the field with the Type 30.

The Type 35 was produced from 1902 to 1905.

== Development ==
The minor modifications, intended to overcome some of the defects of the Type 30, including converting the gun-sight's rear sight leaf (rear sight ladder) from slide-out to a "fan out" (扇転式, ōten shiki), and adding a dust cover (遊底覆, yūteifuku). Unlike the Type 38 rifle bolt action, the crudely designed dust cover was not connected to the bolt action, and had to be manually moved before and after firing. However, the modified design was unable to overcome the shortcomings of the Type 30, and it was superseded by the Type 38 rifle.

The dust cover design, slightly modified, was also used on the Type 46 rifles and Type 47 carbines made for Siam that was also made at the Tokyo Artillery Arsenal around the same time.

== Variants ==
Type Hiroki sub-caliber training device

The Type Hiroki sub-caliber training device was system designed to be temporarily fastened to a cannon barrel. The device was used to train Imperial Japanese Navy gun crews in basic cannon fire control operation. The device was formed around a stripped down Type 35 action made for this specific purpose. The Type 35 action is like the standard Type 35 rifles, including the stamped Imperial Chrysanthemum, except it lacks a serial number stamped on the action itself and is lacking the manually actuated dust cover. Some of these rifles, stripped from the rest of its device, may have been made into some of the "02/45" rifles.

02/45 rifle Little is known about these rifles, including its official designation, if it ever had one at all. Its name is what collectors refer to them as: 02 as in 1902 when the Type 35s were adopted and 45 as in 1945 when the rifles were supposedly made. The maker is thought, but not confirmed, to be Izawa Firearms Manufactory in Osaka as the company was extensively involved in the making of training rifles and machine guns of the type that parts were used in the making of "02/40" rifles. Pre-production Type 35 models, barreled actions from Hiroki sub-caliber training devices, and uncompleted rifles that were left in storage were mated with Type 99 long rifle training rifle stocks and parts to make functional rifles for the ever-desperate Japanese war effort. Most do not have serial numbers and dust covers. Some of the barrels used in construction of these rifles have reject stamps on them and some of the Type 35 receivers have markings indicating they were scrapped or decommissioned. After using up all the Type 35, 38 and 30 barrels they had on hand, the makers started using training machine gun barrels. Some of these rifles were reported to have been used on Okinawa.

== Accessories ==
The Type 35 bayonet was a slightly modified Type 30 bayonet made specifically for the Type 35 rifle. The dimensions of the bayonet is almost exactly the same as the Type 30 bayonet. The only real difference between the two is the addition of a spring catch that hooks into the scabbard when not in use.

== Users ==
- Finland: A few captured from Red Finns or left behind in Finland during World War I. Later used by the Civil Guard.
- Empire of Japan: Imperial Japanese Navy
- Russian Empire: Bought from Japan during World War I.
- Siam: A few supplied for testing or as sale samples.
- Spanish Republic: Rifles sourced from the USSR were used during the Spanish Civil War.

== Bibliography ==
- Honeycutt Jr., Fred L. and Anthony, Patt F. Military Rifles of Japan. Fifth Edition, 2006. Julin Books, U.S.A. ISBN 0-9623208-7-0.
- Allan, Francis C.; White, Doss H.; Zielinkski, Dr. Stanley. The Early Arisakas 2006. AK Enterprises, U.S.A. ISBN 0-9614814-5-5.
