= Type 45 =

Type 45 may refer to:

- Type 45 destroyer of the British Royal Navy
- Type 45 240 mm howitzer, a weapon of the Imperial Japanese Army
- Type 45 Siamese Mauser, misnomer for Type 46 Siamese Mauser, a service rifle adopted by the government of Siam
