= Type 30 rifle =

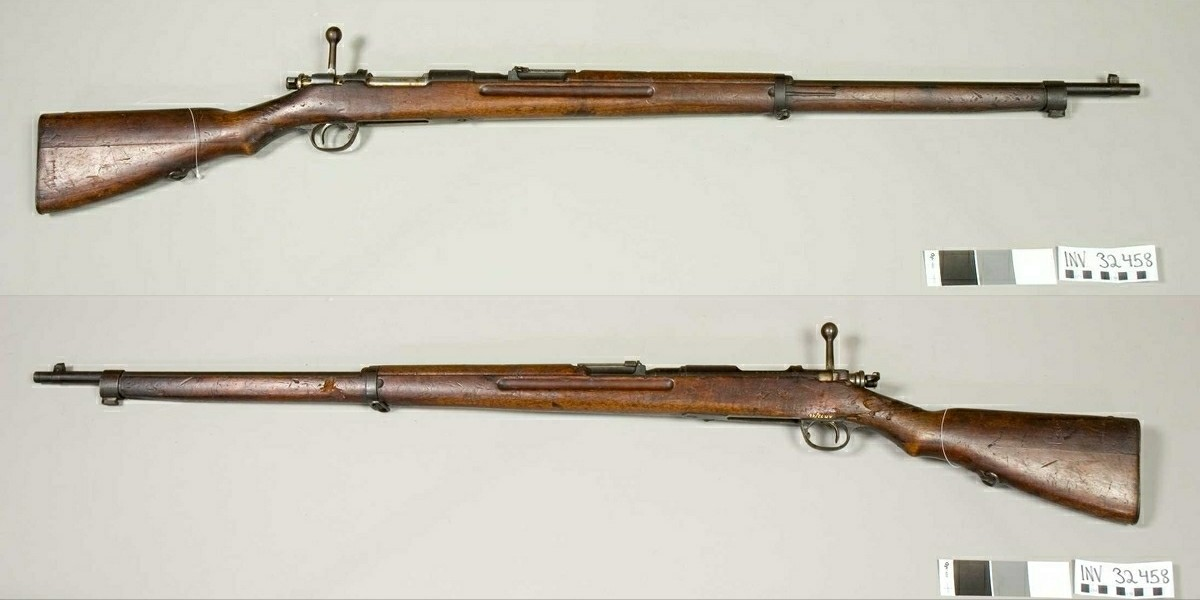
- A Type 30 from the Swedish Army Museum
- Type: Bolt-action rifle
- Place of origin: Empire of Japan

Service history
- In service: 1899–1945 (Japan)
- Used by: Users
- Wars: Boxer Rebellion; Russo-Japanese War; World War I Spanish Civil War; Second Sino-Japanese War; World War II; Chinese Civil War; First Indochina War; Korean War; Indonesian National Revolution; Malayan Emergency; Vietnam War

Production history
- Designed: 1897
- No. built: Rifles: 554,000; Carbines: 45,000

Specifications
- Mass: 3.95 kg (8 lb 11 oz); 3.2 kg (7 lb 1 oz) (carbine)
- Length: 1,274 mm (50.2 in); 964 mm (38.0 in) (carbine)
- Barrel length: 790 mm (31 in); 480 mm (19 in) (carbine)
- Cartridge: 6.5×50mm Arisaka; 6.5×54mm Mannlicher–Schönauer; 7.62×39mm (post-war Chinese modified).303 British
- Action: Bolt action
- Muzzle velocity: 765 m/s (2,510 ft/s)
- Feed system: 5-round internal magazine

The Type 30 rifle Arisaka (三十年式歩兵銃, Sanjū-nen-shiki hoheijū; 'year 30 type infantry firearm') is a box-fed bolt-action repeating rifle that was the standard infantry rifle of the Imperial Japanese Army from 1897 (the 30th year of the Meiji period, hence "Type 30") to 1905.

== History and development ==
The Imperial Japanese Army began development of a new rifle in December 1895 to replace the Murata rifle, which had been in use since 1880. The project was handled by the Koishikawa Arsenal in Tokyo under the direction of Colonel Arisaka Nariakira, and was the first in a series of rifles which would be used through World War II. By 1900, the Imperial Japanese Army had most of its divisions fully equipped with the rifle.

The Type 30 was first designed for the semi-rimmed 6.5×50mm Arisaka cartridge. The sights could be set up to 2,000 meters (2,200 yd). Besides the standard rifle, there was also a carbine version, 962 mm (37.9 in) long, which was intended for the cavalry and other troops who needed a shorter or lighter weapon. It had a sight that could be set up to 1,500 meters (1,600 yd). The prototype was called the "Type 29 rifle" and, after enhancements, was redesignated as the "Type 30". It went into production in 1899. This weapon could be equipped with the Type 30 bayonet.

The Type 30 was used by front-line Japanese forces in the Russo-Japanese War. Although it was a major improvement over the Type 22 rifle (also known as "Murata"), it had some reliability and safety issues. Based on combat experience, an improved version, the Type 38 rifle, was introduced in 1905, although not all units received the new version and, as a result, a mixture of models was retained by the Japanese Army into World War I and later into World War II.

Aside from Japan, the Type 30 was supplied to numerous nations during and after World War I. The most predominant user was the Russian Empire, who ordered up to 600,000 Arisaka rifles, with at least half of those being Type 30 rifles and carbines.

Early in World War I Britain ordered around 150,000 Type 30, and Type 38 rifles and carbines from Japan as a stopgap until the manufacture of their own Lee–Enfield rifles caught up with demand. Some of these rifles were handed over to the Royal Navy and to Arab forces fighting with Lawrence of Arabia. The majority of these weapons (Type 30s and Type 38s) were handed over to Russia in 1916, who were far more desperate for arms. Russia in turn also bought many more thousands of Type 30s rifles and carbines, Type 35 rifles and Type 38 rifles and carbines from Japan. A number of these rifles ended up being left behind in Finland or captured from Red Finns in the Finnish Civil War as the Soviets armed them with Arisakas. Later on Finland gave some of these rifles to Estonia who also received them from other sources. Estonia later converted some or all to take .303 British as Britain had also supplied Estonia with Vickers machine guns and P14 rifles. The Czechoslovak Legion fighting in the Russian Civil War was also armed with Japanese Arisakas, including the Type 30.

In Vietnam, captured or imported Type 30 rifles were primarily used by militias and irregular forces, especially in the decades following World War II, due to widespread availability of ex-Japanese firearms in Southeast Asia.

== Variations and modified types ==
The main production version was the long rifle but carbine versions were available for cavalry and mounted troops.

=== Carbine ===
The Type 30 carbine or cavalry rifle (三十年式騎銃(三十年式騎兵銃), Sanjū-nen-shiki kijū (Sanjū-nen-shiki kiheijū)) is a modified version made 300 mm (12 in) shorter than the infantry model (the carbine's barrel measures 480 mm (19 in) against 790 mm (31 in) for the standard infantry issue). Intended to equip cavalry troops with a modern carbine. Differences other than the shorter barrel and stock from the standard infantry rifle is that it lacked a handguard over the barrel, the rear sight ladder only went up to 1,500 meters (compared to the rifles 2,000 meters), the front sight had protection guards on each side, and slight changes to the bolt stop latch and the sling swivels were moved to the left side of the gun to prevent the bolt from digging into the cavalry trooper's back. The pre-production version lacked a bayonet.

=== Training rifle ===
Approximately 10,000 rifles were converted into blank-firing training rifles around 1905–1921. The weapon's rifled barrel was bored out to make the barrel smooth bore and most of the receiver markings were removed, including the Imperial Chrysanthemum. In its place were the characters 空 放 銃, which mean 'blank firing gun'.

=== Manchu Arisaka ===
The "Manchu Arisaka" is a Chinese contract of the Type 30 rifle and carbine. Collectors refer to them as "Manchu Arisakas"; the actual Chinese military designation is unknown. Three versions are known to exist and are named from the markings on the receiver that are in Chinese. Kuang-Hsū 29 year made (光绪二十九年製), Kuang-Hsū 31 year made (光绪三十一年製), and the Kuang-Hsū 32 year made (光绪三十二年製). The Kuang-Hsū 29 year made and Kuang-Hsū 31 year made rifles and carbines except for the first 1,500 Kuang-Hsū 29 year made rifles which used a Type 30 ladder sight, had tangent leaf rear sights similar to the Siamese Mauser Type 45 and Type 46. The Kuang-Hsū 29 year made and Kuang-Hsū 31 year made rifles also had a different upper handguard than the Type 30 rifle, which contains a rectangular cut-out, completely enclosing the rear sight. Kuang-Hsū 32 year made rifles had the standard Type 30 rear sight ladder. Instead of the Japanese Imperial Chrysanthemum stamped on the receiver as the Japanese version had, the receiver is stamped with a coiled dragon that represents the reign of the Manchu emperors. Named for the nominal Emperor of China at the time, Kuang-Hsū, and the years of his reign when they were produced (29th, 31st, and 32nd). While Kuang-Hsū's name appears on the rifle, the real person that behind the contract of these rifles from Japan was General Yuan Shikai. Very little is known about them because so few of the approximately 36,000 rifles and 7,000 carbines were made and most of those were badly worn rifles imported to the United States from mainland China in the 1980s.

=== North China carbine copy ===
A crude copy of the Japanese Type 30 carbine was made in China to arm puppet troops of Japan. Believed to have been made mostly in the Chinese city of Tientsin, the main difference between this carbine and the Japanese Type 30 carbine is that the copy is made in 7.92×57mm Mauser (8mm Mauser) and the stock is of one-piece construction instead of the typical two-piece the Japanese used. The receiver is marked with a cherry blossom instead of the usual Japanese Imperial Chrysanthemum found on Japanese rifles and carbines.

=== Type 35 naval rifle ===
A modified and improved Type 30 made for the Imperial Japanese Navy.

=== 7.62x39 conversion ===
A few Type 30 carbines were converted to use 7.62x39 ammo with minimal changes. They are rarely seen since the Type 38 is most commonly used weapon converted by China after World War II.

== Users ==
- Austria-Hungary: Some captured on the Eastern Front during World War I. When ammunition was running out some were converted to the 6.5×54mm Mannlicher–Schönauer cartridge and their rear sight leaves were possibly replaced with Mannlicher M95 type ones.
- Czechoslovakia: Used by Czechoslovak Legion during the Russian Civil War
- Empire of Japan
- Estonia: Most Type 30s converted to take the .303 British cartridge
- Finland: Some used by the Finnish Army
- Kingdom of Hejaz: Supplied by Royal Navy to Lawrence of Arabia for Arab Forces during Arab Revolt
- Republic of China: Type 30s used by Zhang Zuolin's Fengtian Army. Some obtained from the Soviet Union from old Tsarist stockpiles.
- Russian Empire: Supplied from Britain as military assistance in World War I and bought from Japan
- Spanish Republic
- United Kingdom: Used by the Royal Navy and home defenses 1914-1916 as stop gap, along with Type 38s, later shipped as military aid to Russia.

== Bibliography ==
- Kowner, Rotem (2006). Historical Dictionary of the Russo-Japanese War. The Scarecrow Press. ISBN 0-8108-4927-5.
