= Type 35 =

Type 35 may refer to:

- Type 35 torpedo boat, a torpedo boat built for Nazi Germany's Kriegsmarine
- Bugatti Type 35, a car produced by Bugatti
- Type 35 rifle, a weapon used by the Imperial Japanese Navy
- Type 35R Raceabout, a car produced by Mercer - see Mercer (automobile)
