= Siamese Mauser style rifle =

Siamese bolt-action rifle

Type 46 Siamese Mauser
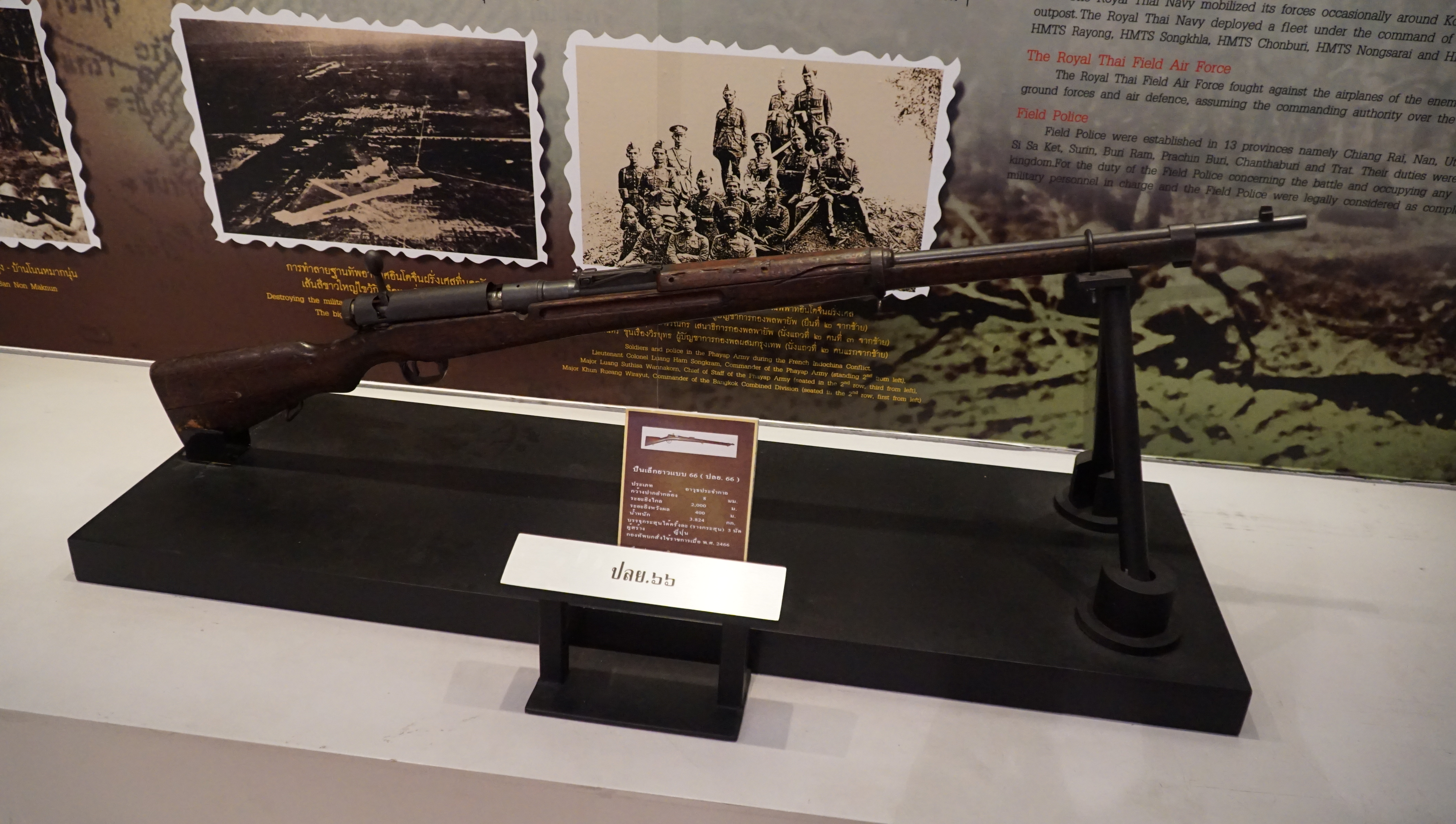
- Type 66 rifle displays in National memorial, Bangkok
- Type: Bolt-action rifle
- Place of origin: Siam

Service history
- In service: 1903 ~ 1950
- Used by: Siam/Thailand
- Wars: World War I World War II

Production history
- Designed: 1903
- Manufacturer: Koishikawa Arsenal
- No. built: ~20,000 (Type 46) ~50,000 (Type 66)
- Variants: Type 46, Type 47, Type 46/66, Type 47/66, Type 66

Specifications
- Cartridge: 8×50mmR Siamese, 8×52mmR Siamese; 30-06 Springfield.30 Carbine
- Caliber: 8 mm, .30 carbine (Type 66)
- Action: Bolt action
- Muzzle velocity: ~ 680 m/s (Type 46/66) ~ 620 m/s (Type 46)
- Feed system: 5-round magazine
- Sights: Iron

Facing the threat of Western colonial expansionism in Southeast Asia during the later part of the 19th century, King Rama V of Siam (now Thailand), sought new weapons as part of a modernization program to ensure the kingdom's independence. After experiments with other rifles, the Siamese military decided to purchase a Mauser rifle based on the Gewehr 98 design as their principle service rifle. Through various modifications, adaptations, and using various cartridges, the Siamese Mausers served as the main infantry weapon of Siam until after World War II.

== History and development ==
Siam's king, Rama V (Chulalongkorn), considered modernization an important check against French colonial expansion from Indochina and British colonial expansion from Malaya following territorial concessions forced upon Siam by both powers. Many countries yielded to pressure from France and Britain and refused to sell Siam modern weapons.

The Siamese military was able to buy out a defaulted Bulgarian contract for Austrian Mannlicher Model 1888/90 rifles. They decided against adopting the Mannlicher, straight-pull bolt action, but the Siamese were impressed with the Austrian 8×50mm rimmed cartridge.

Despite British and French efforts, Siam also managed to buy a license to build Mauser's Gewehr 98 rifle. However, Siam lacked the necessary manufacturing capability. Japan did have the required capability and Siam contracted with Japan's Koishikawa Arsenal to build their rifles.

== Description and variant rifle types ==
=== Type 46 rifle ===
The first Siamese Mauser used the Gewehr 98 bolt with the cock-on-open action, but removed the recoil lug with the narrower lines of the Mauser model of 1896. Some features and characteristics of the Japanese Type 35 rifle (under development in the same arsenal at that time) were also incorporated, such as the sliding dust cover and long wrist tangs. Some Siamese Type 46 rifles also have a split buttstock common on Arisaka rifles. Although the design was licensed from Mauser, none of the components of the Siamese rifles are interchangeable with other Mauser rifles.

The Type 46 was chambered for the Type 45 8×50mm rimmed cartridge. The cartridge designation is the source of a misnomer for the rifle and led to the confusion of some referring to a "Type 45" rifle. The cartridge was formally adopted before the rifles as cartridge dimensions needed to be settled before rifle production could begin.

Just below the Chakram symbol on the forward receiver bridge, the rifles were marked "ร,ศ,๑๒๑" (R.S. 121) representing Rattanakosin Sok (รัตนโกสินทรศก, abbreviated as ร.ศ. and R.S.) for the 121st year of Chakri Dynasty (royal family). Since the Thai year started in April on the Gregorian calendar, there is some overlap, but the adoption year is equated as 1903. In 1913, the new king, King Rama VI (Vajiravudh), changed the calendar to use the Buddhist Era for official documents and the rifle was redesignated as the Type 46 for the year 2446 BE (1903). The Koishikawa Arsenal stamp of four stacked cannonballs is stamped on the left side of the receiver under the dust cover next to an inspection mark.

The serial number on the Type 46 is stamped in Thai numerals on the rear receiver bridge. The numbers can be read left to right just as in Western writing systems. Many imported Siamese Mausers may be inscribed with a second serial number using Arabic numerals added by the importer. Due to a lack of familiarity with Thai numerals, the serial numbers issued by importers rarely match the original Thai serial number.

The rear sight was a folding leaf or Buffington style with a graduated and arched ramp where a slider between the post and ramp raises the sight post. The wings of the sight ramp was inscribed with Thai numerals, possibly representing meters, with the highest number being ๒๐ (20, for 2000m).

Major components were forged, fabricated, and machined in Japan. The components were then sent to an arsenal in Bangkok where the rifles were assembled with technical assistance from the Japanese.

=== Type 47 carbine ===
The Type 47 is a carbine length version of the Type 46 rifle equipped with a shorter barrel and marked "ร,ศ,๑๒๓" (R.S. 123, BE 2447) under the Chakram symbol. Many Type 46 rifles were converted to carbine length in the 1960s. The converted rifles can be identified because the receiver bridge markings were not changed from "ร,ศ,๑๒๑" (R.S. 121).

=== Type 46/66 rifle and Type 47/66 carbine ===
In 1923 (2466 BE), the Siamese military decided to upgrade their ammunition with a spitzer bullet to improve range. The new cartridge was adopted as the Type 66. Existing Type 46 and Type 47 rifles were rechambered for the 8×52mm rimmed Type 66 round. The rear sight ramps were also ground down to reflect the flatter trajectory of the new ammunition. As a result, many of the Thai numbers inscribed on rear sight ramps are partially cut-off. No other changes were made to the rifles or carbines during the rechambering process. Following the rechambering, the rifles were redesignated as the Type 46/66 rifle and Type 47/66 carbine.

After World War II, some Siamese Mausers were shortened and chambered for 30-06 Springfield. The Thai military and police found the recoil from the 30-06 in the shorter rifles excessive.

=== Type 66 rifle ===
The Siamese Type 66 rifle is an export model of the Japanese Type 38 rifle ordered in 1923 and built in the Koishikawa Arsenal. Delivery was delayed until 1928-29 due to catastrophic damage to Tokyo from the 1923 Great Kantō earthquake. Although a Type 38 in appearance and function, very few of the Type 66 parts are interchangeable with the Japanese rifle. Although not strictly a Mauser rifle, the Arisaka receiver is a modified Gewehr 98 action that borrows heavily from the Mauser design.

The Type 66 rifles were chambered for the Type 66, 8×52mmR Siamese, cartridge.

In the late 1950s some were converted to fire .30 Carbine ammunition.

== Description and variant ammunition types ==
=== Type 45 8×50mmR Siamese ===
Before their new rifles could be manufactured, the Siamese military had to settle upon cartridge dimensions. Although dimensionally similar to the Mannlicher round they favored from earlier rifles, the 8×50mmR Siamese was unique to Siam and was not interchangeable with the Austrian ammunition (Siamese ammunition chambers and can be fired in Austrian rifles but not vice versa). The new cartridge was adopted in "ร,ศ,๑๒๐" (R.S. 120) and later redesignated Type 45 for BE 2445 (1902 CE). This was the likely source of confusion and misnomer for the rifle described above. The ammunition is Type 45 and the rifle is Type 46.

The Type 45 cartridge fired a round-nosed bullet typical of main military battle rifles at the time.

=== Type 66 8×52mmR Siamese ===
After the French introduction of the spitzer bullet in the 8×50mmR Lebel rimmed cartridge in 1898, other countries followed suit. Germany introduced a spitzer style bullet in 1903 with the 7.92×57mm Mauser, the United States reworked the recently introduced .30-03 of 1903 into the 30-06 of 1906, and Britain revised their 303 British cartridge with a spitzer bullet in 1910. In 1923, Siam also followed the lead of other countries by adopting the Type 66 cartridge (BE 2466). In addition to a spitzer bullet, the Type 66 ammunition was approximately 2mm longer, making it an 8×52mm rimmed cartridge.

== Variants ==
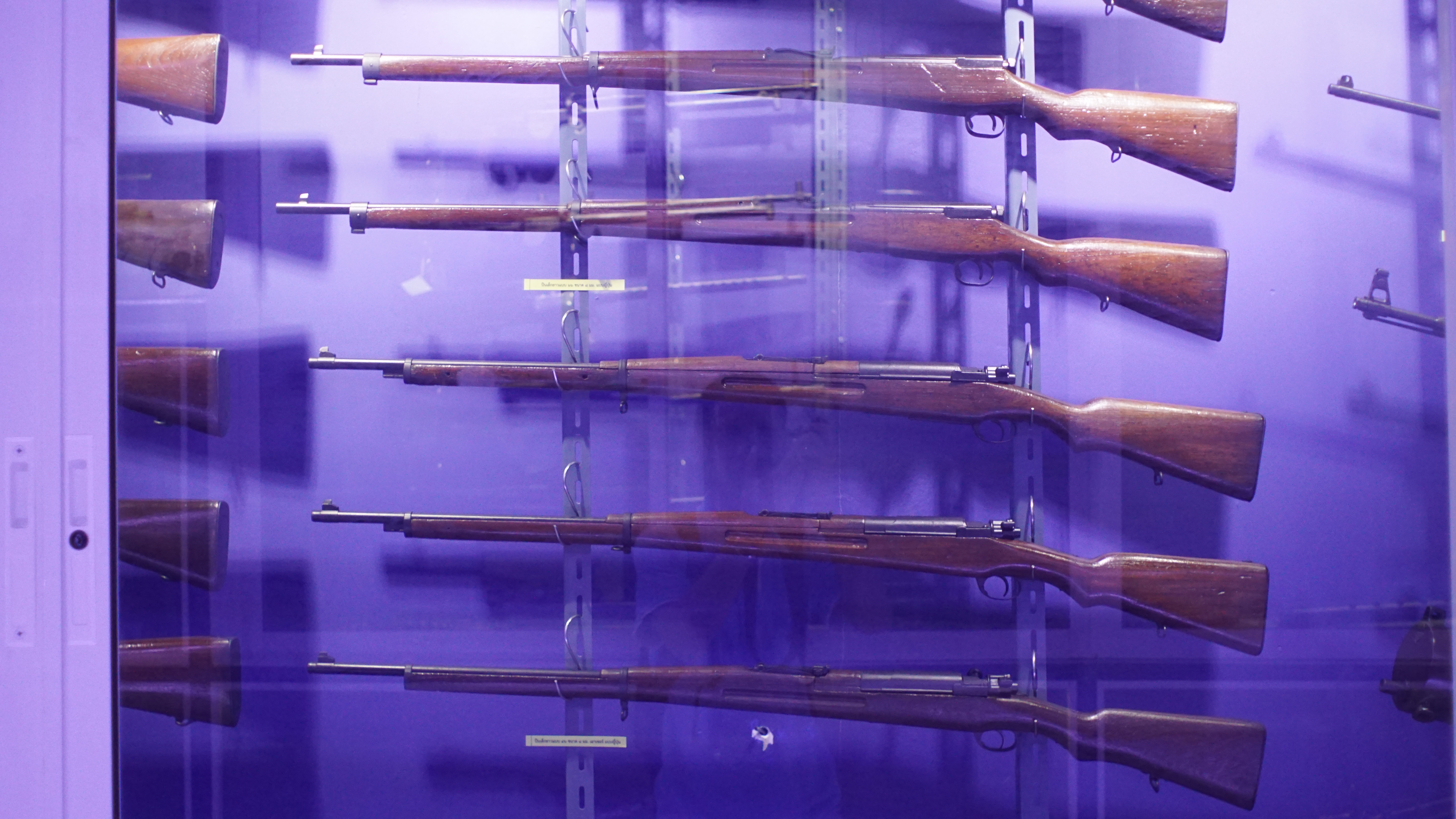
Type 46 and 66 Siamese Mauser in the Royal Thai Air Force Museum

- Type 46 Siamese Mauser rifle (copy of the Swedish Mauser and Gewehr 98)
- Type 47 Siamese Mauser carbine (copy of the Swedish Mauser and Gewehr 98)
- Type 66 Siamese Mauser rifle (copy of the Arisaka type 38)
- Type 46/66 Siamese Mauser rifle (rechambered Type 46)
- Type 47/66 Siamese Mauser carbine (rechambered Type 47)
