= Type 30 bayonet =

Sword bayonet

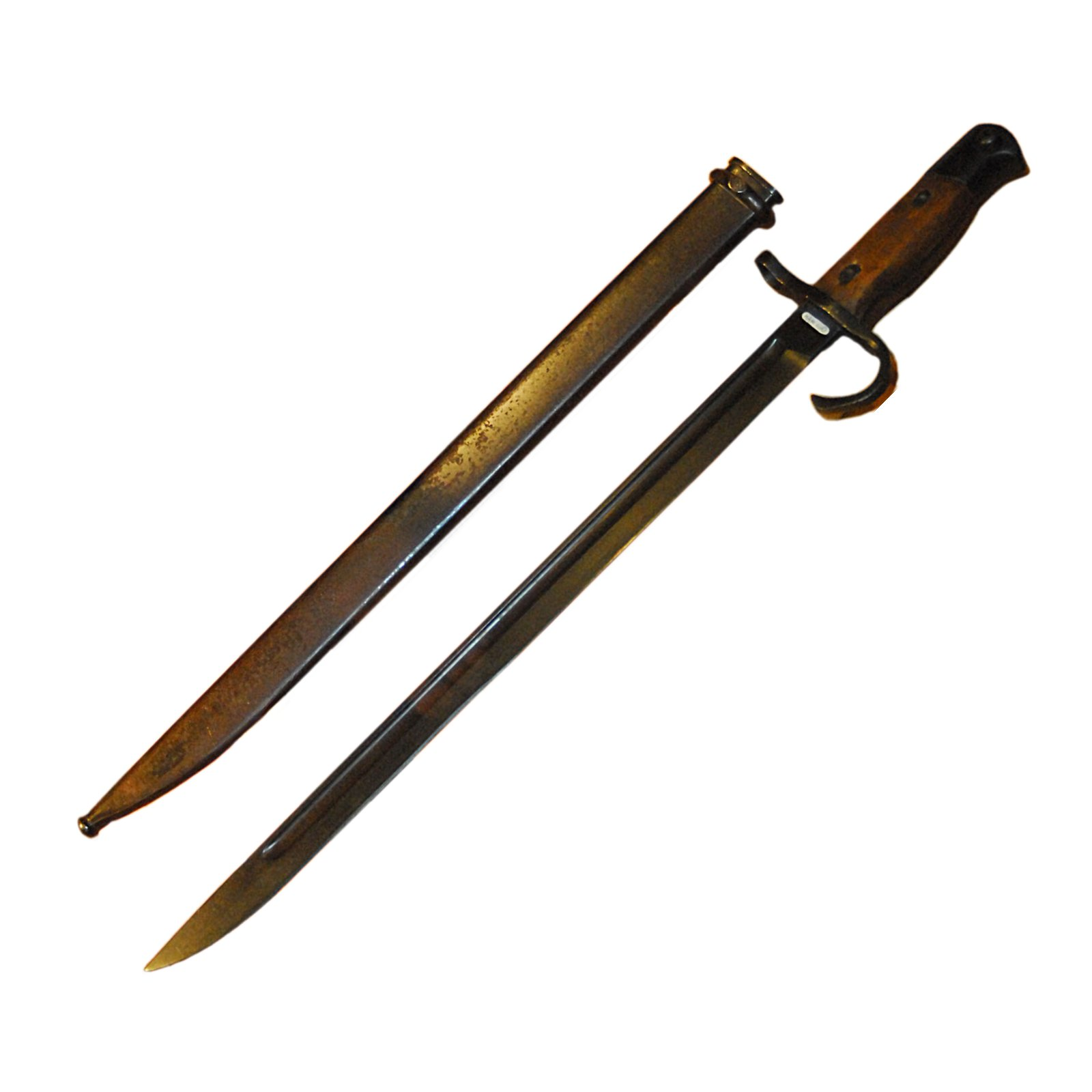
- Japanese Type 30 Bayonet
- Type: Bayonet
- Place of origin: Empire of Japan

Service history
- Wars: Russo-Japanese War; World War I Finnish Civil War; Second Sino-Japanese War; World War II; Chinese Civil War; Indonesian National Revolution; First Indochina War; Korean War; Vietnam War

Production history
- Designed: 1897
- Unit cost: 9.15 yen ($2.5 USD) in August 1939
- Produced: 1897–1945
- No. built: ~8,400,000

Specifications
- Mass: 700 g (25 oz)
- Length: 514 mm (20.2 in)
- Blade length: 400 mm (16 in)

The Type 30 bayonet (三十年式銃剣, sanjūnen-shiki jūken) is a bayonet that was designed for the Imperial Japanese Army to be used with the Arisaka Type 30 Rifle, which was later used on the Type 38 and Type 99 rifles, the Type 96 and Type 99 light machine guns, and the Type 100 submachine gun.

== Design ==
The Type 30 bayonet is a single-edged sword bayonet with a 400 mm (16 in) blade and an overall length of 514 mm (20.2 in) with a weight of approximately 700 g (25 oz). The Type 30 bayonet is also known as the "Pattern 1897 bayonet".

Early Type 30 bayonets usually sported a J-shaped hooked quillon guard designed to catch and trap the enemy's blade. By 1942, the quillon was eliminated to save materials and decrease production time, leaving only a straight guard.

Type 30 scabbards went from metal (pre–1942), to vulcanized fiber (1942–1943), and finally to wood or bamboo (1944–1945). Scabbards were usually painted black and called a burdock sword (gobo ken) as it looked like burdock, a vegetable.

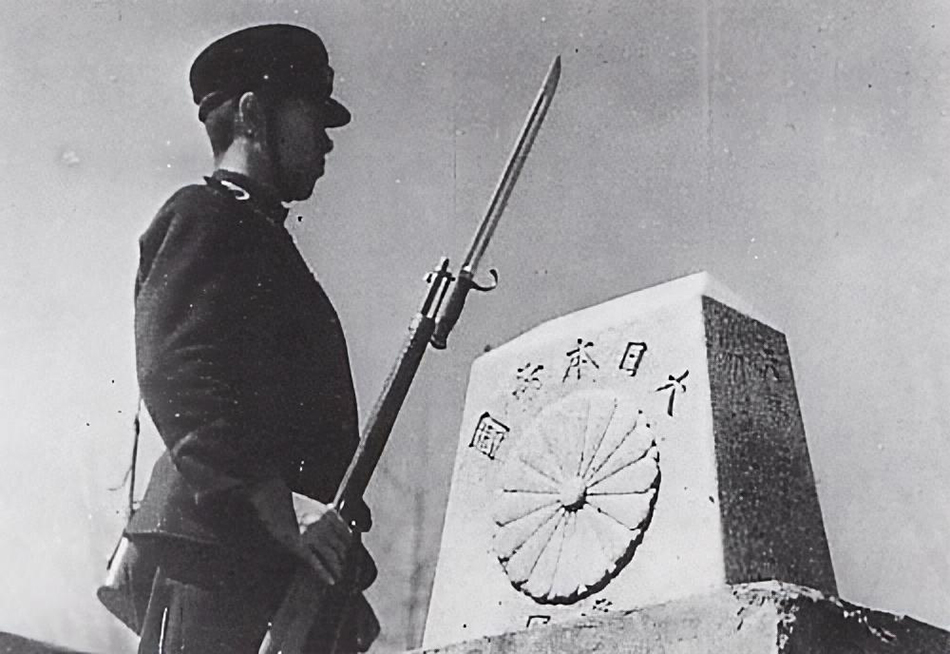
Japanese soldier in Sakhalin equipped with fixed Type 30

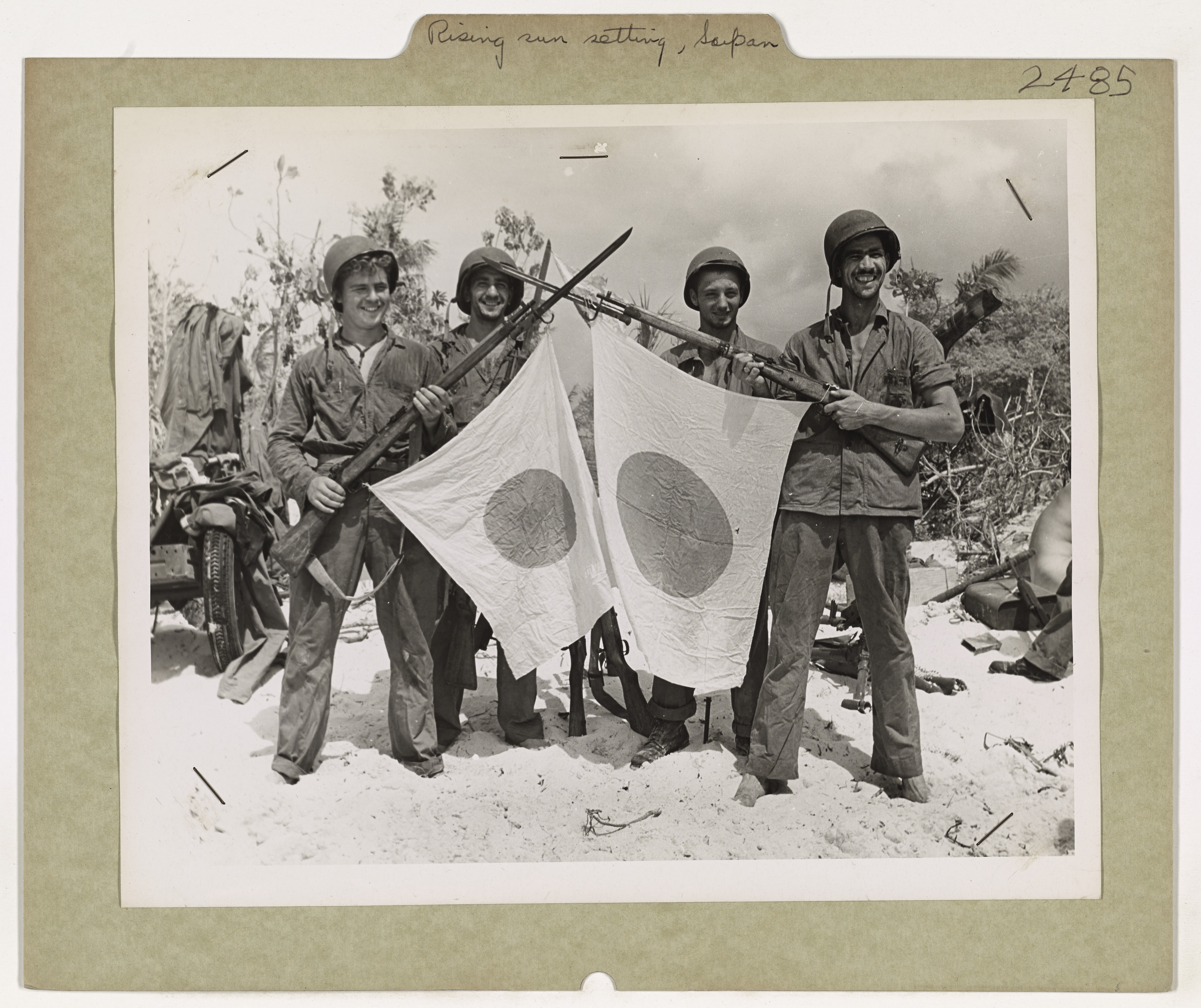
American sailors and coastguardsmen with captured Type 30 bayonets affixed on their rifles on Tarawa, November 1943

The design was intended to give the average Japanese infantryman a long enough reach to pierce the abdomen of a cavalryman. However, the structure had a number of drawbacks, some caused by the poor quality of forgings used, which tended to rust quickly, not hold an edge, and break when bent.

The weapon was manufactured from 1897 to 1945 at a number of locations, including the Kokura Arsenal, Koishikawa Arsenal (Tokyo), and Nagoya Arsenal, as well as under contract by private manufacturers including Matsushita, and Toyoda Automatic Loom.

== Adoption ==
Some 8.4 million were produced, and it remained in front-line use from the Russo-Japanese War to the end of World War II.

All Japanese infantrymen were issued with the Type 30, whether they were armed with a rifle or pistol, or even if they were unarmed. Because of its reliability, it was a valuable tool and weapon for Japanese infantrymen.

== Users ==
- Austria-Hungary
- Republic of China
- Estonia
- Finland
- Indonesia
- Empire of Japan
  - Imperial Japanese Armed Forces
- Korea
- North Vietnam
- Russian Empire
- United Kingdom

== See also ==
- Guntō
