= Hugues Krafft =

French photographer

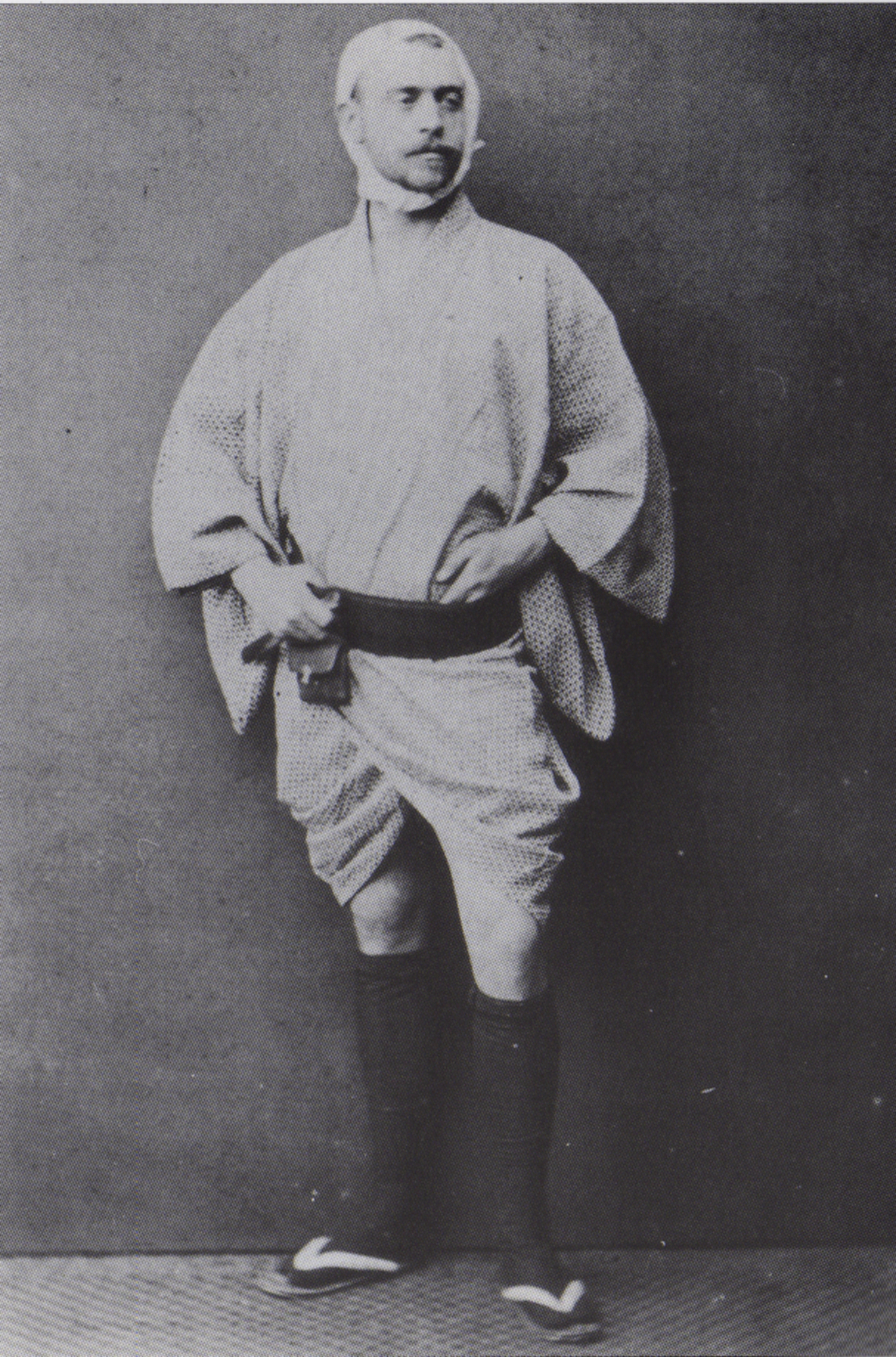
Hugues Krafft in Japan in 1882–1883

Hugues Krafft (1853 – 1935) was a photographer born in Paris. He travelled around the world, and visited Japan in 1882–1883. He left numerous quality photographs of the period.

He was among the first to use instantaneous photography in Japan (he used a Zeiss camera with gelatine-silver bromide plates, a process which became widely available in 1880), which allowed him to take vivid pictures in an open environment, in contrast to the many staged studio photographs made by his predecessors.

== Biography ==
=== Origins and youth ===
Hugues Krafft was born on December 1, 1853, in the Frankfurt am Main temple to his father Guillaume Hugues Krafft, and his mother Emma Mumm. His father was a German who immigrated to France in 1836, working first as a traveler for and then as a partner to Louis Roederer, a Champagne wine merchant. A genealogical research of the family origins was done by Hugues Krafft himself in 1903, the resulting document of which is now kept in the Musée-Hôtel Le Vergeur.

When two years old, the family settled in Reims. He acquired his primary education from private tutors and afterwards in the private boys’ college Eton. Krafft continued his father’s path as a wine merchant. In 1875, he enlisted in the French army as a conditional enlistee of the 3rd Engineer Regiment. After his father’s death in 1877, Krafft left Reims to live in Paris until the death of his mother three years later which left him with the family fortune.

=== Travels ===
The inheritance Krafft received, enabled him to travel. In 1881, he started a world tour with his brother Hermann, and two other friends, Louis Borchard and Charles Kessler. According to Isabelle Chastang, they had modeled their travels based on the journey in Around the World in Eighty Days by Jules Verne. His journey started with Greece and Spain in 1885, continuing to Italy and Bavaria in 1886. His next destination was the ‘Orient’, visiting the Maghreb in the spring of 1887 and Egypt and Palestine in the fall of the same year. In 1896, he traveled to Bosnia and Montenegro, and in 1898 to Russia, where he attended the coronation of Tsar Nicholas II, Crimea, and the Caucasus.

His last major journey took him to Transcaucasia and Russian Turkestan, resulting in his travelogue which was a real success. It was rewarded by the Société de Géographie of Paris as well as the French Academy. Upon returning from his world tour, he gave several conferences on his stay in various countries at the Société de Géographie, where he also exhibited photos from his travels.

=== Late life and death ===
Apart from Société de Géographie, Krafft was also a member of Société française d'archéologie, Société des amis de Versailles, and de l'Association française des amis de l'Orient (AFAO). His membership cards are still preserved in the Musée-Hôtel Le Vergeur. He was knighted in the Legion of Honour by President Sadi Carnot in 1889.

After returning from his travels, he had a house with a Japanese garden built in Jouy-en-Josas. In 1909, he founded the Société des amis du vieux Reims with the help of Ernest Kalas. He bought the Musée-Hôtel Le Vergeur in 1910 which was largely destroyed in World War I. By auctioning off his collection of Far Eastern objects in 1925, he funded its rebuilding and restoration. Some of the auctioned-off collection is now housed in the Musée de l'Homme and the Louvre.

His personal library is still kept in the Musée-Hôtel Le Vergeur. He had a considerable collection of travel accounts, mostly purchased by himself and some received as gifts from fellow travelers such as Guillaume Depping and Edmond Cotteau.

After a bicycle accident in 1896, he required regular hydrotherapy and therefore limited his travels. From 1911, he visited Bagnoles-de-l'Orne annually to receive this treatment. He died on May 10, 1935, leaving the hotel to the Société des amis du vieux Reims, still being its headquarters.

== Travel writing ==
Less than two years after the end of his world tour, Krafft published his travelogue named Souvenirs de notre tour du monde with 24 collotypes, 20 of them taken by himself, and five maps tracing his route through his journey. His book contains the letters he sent to his family, mainly his sister Félicie, during his 18-months journey to English India, Ceylon (Sri Lanka) and Cochinchina (Vietnam), Java, China, Japan, and America. Among the countries he visited, he spent most of his book talking about Japan, where he spent a quarter of his trip there alone. Furthermore, of the 24 photographs, 11 are from Japan. In addition to this travelogue, his travel diary has also been found in the Musée-Hôtel Le Vergeur, which covers the world tour from the start until May 1882, before arriving in Japan. His letters also mention a ‘special Japan’ diary which has not been found so far.

In a short preface, Krafft indicates the purpose of publishing his travelogue:

“Certainly, there are not yet enough French people who, taking advantage of their wealth and independence, or who, encouraged by their too frequently fearful families, decide to travel the world. Are we not counting too easily those who, free of apprehensions that are for the most part ill-founded, go to seek in our own colonies, in these distant centers where the English language now reigns unchallenged, the activity and prosperity that so many foreigners know how to find there? If the story of our journey could, in its small way, contribute to bringing out of our old Europe a too hesitant youth, and stimulate the interest that, nowadays, everyone should devote to questions that have become universal, I would have achieved my goal. In that case, I shall be glad to have withdrawn these simple "Souvenirs de notre Tour du Monde" from the shadows for which I had originally intended them.”

== Photography ==
Krafft is a photography enthusiast who used “a Zeiss camera with glass plates covered with an impressionable layer of gelatin-silver bromide, a technique widespread since 1880.” The camera, its plates, and its accessories were so heavy that they required an additional rickshaw just for them. The difficulty of using this equipment prevented Krafft from taking every shot that he wished but forced him to take those only worth the hassle and to organize photographic sessions. He developed the photos he took during the journey and for this purpose, he installed a photographic laboratory at his residence in Japan.

The Musée-Hôtel Le Vergeur holds 435 photographs of Japan, 378 with their original photographic plates. Not counting the duplicate photos, there are 361 individual photos, of which 60 are not done by Krafft but from the workshop of Felice Beato. The majority of photos done by Krafft revolve around ‘human types’ and the Japanese population.

== Works ==
- Souvenirs de notre tour du monde (1885)
- A travers le Turkestan russe (1902)
- A travers le Turkestan russe : ouvrage illustré de deux cent-soixante-cinq gravures d'après les clichés de l'auteur et contenant une carte en couleurs (1902)

== Gallery ==
Media related to Hugues Krafft at Wikimedia Commons

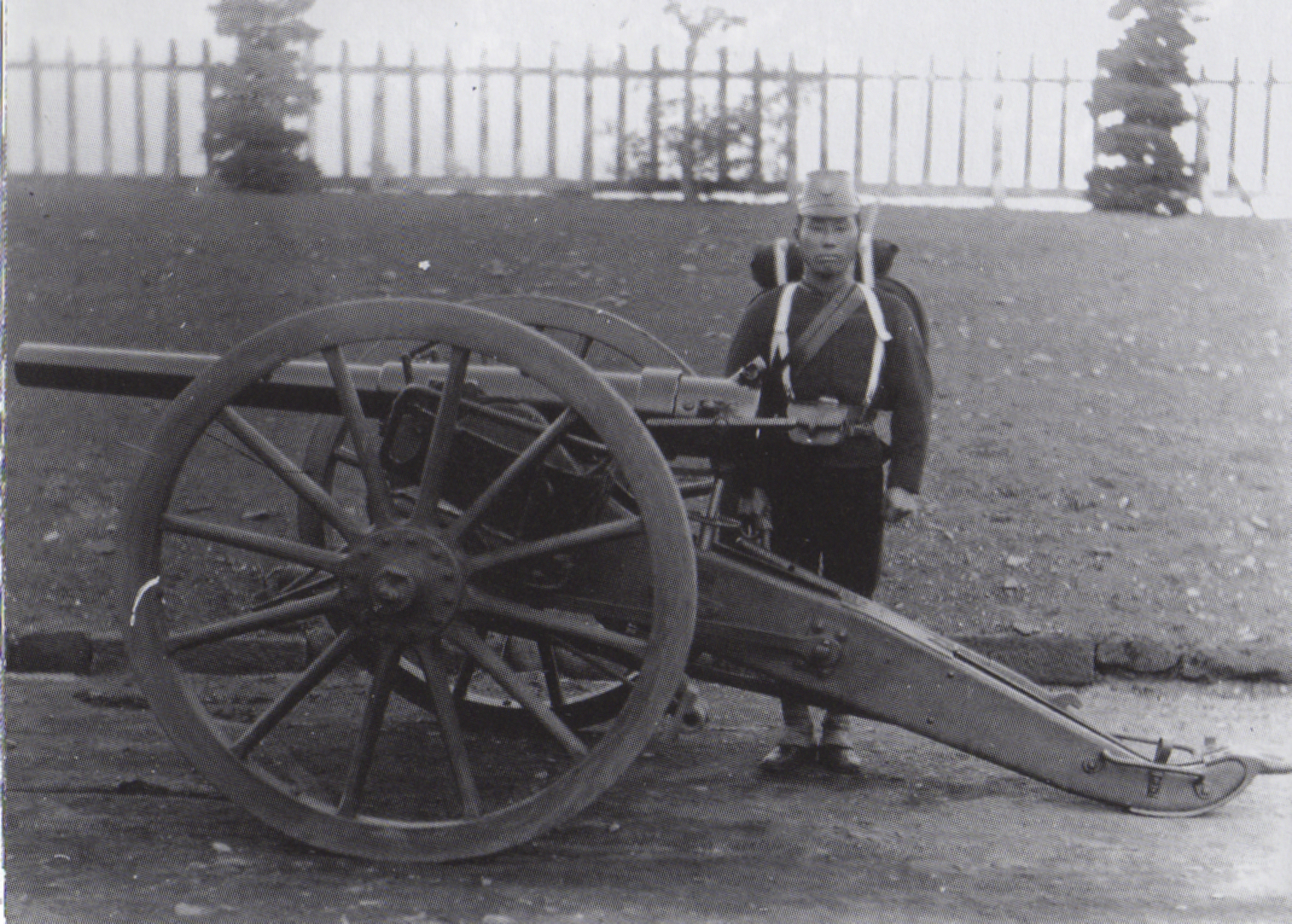
Artillery unit at the Koishikawa arsenal, Tokyo, in 1882.

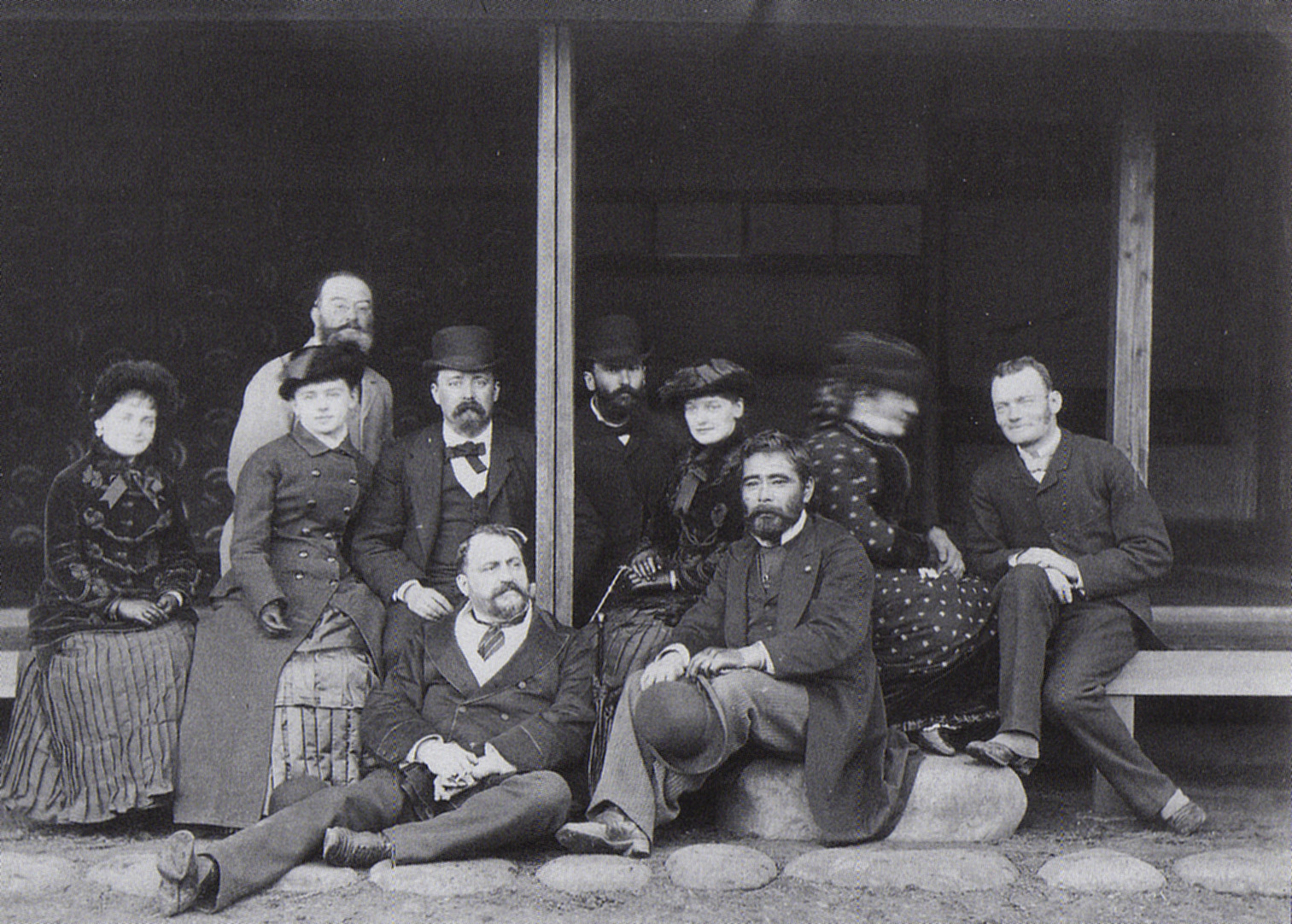
Felice Beato with Saigō Tsugumichi (seated in front) in 1882.

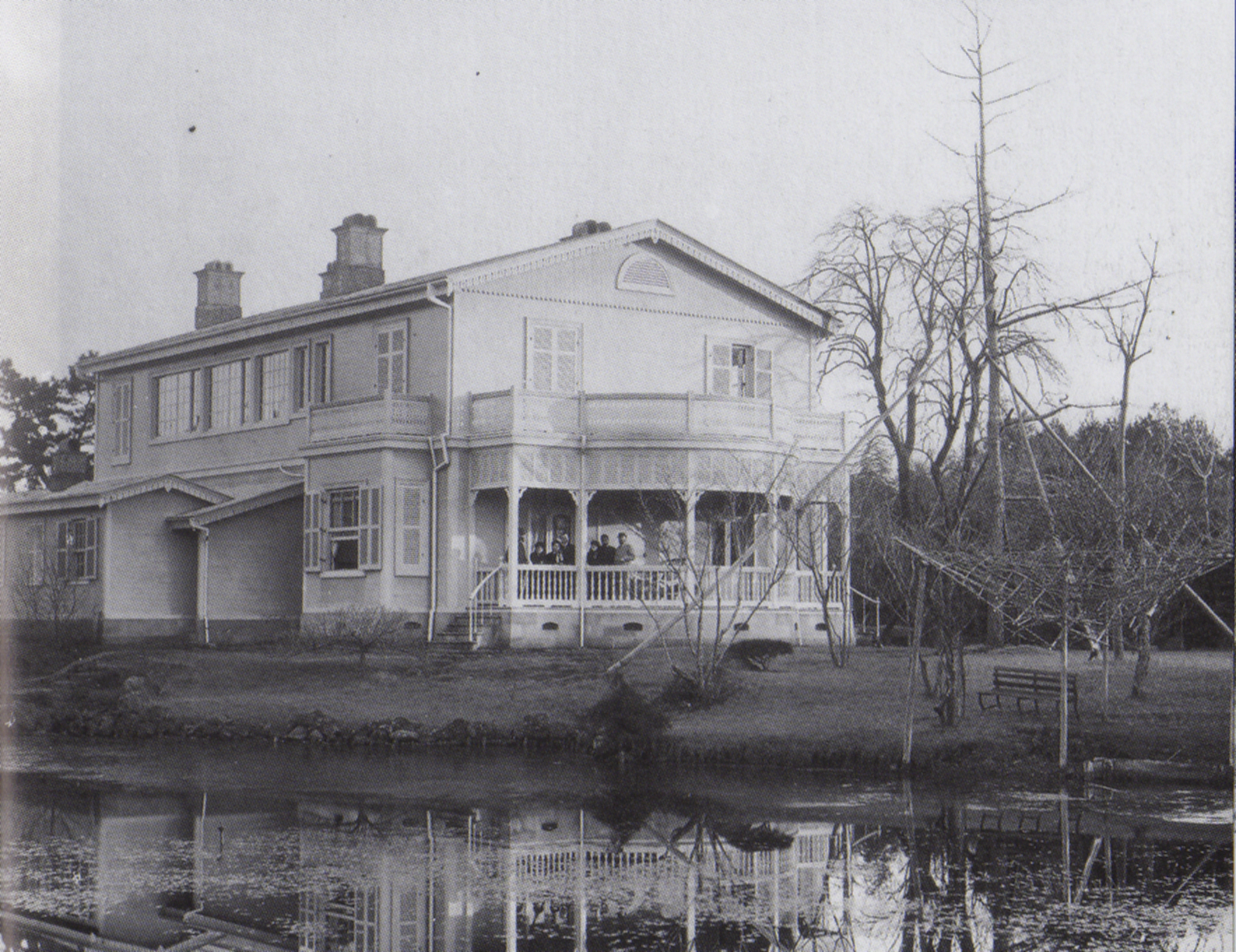
The house of Saigo Tsugumichi.

== See also ==
- List of French photographers
- Felice Beato

== Sources ==
- Chastang, I. (2006). Le Tour du monde en cinq cent soixante-treize jours, ou les rencontres entre Le tour du Monde en quatre-vingt jours de Jules Verne (1873) et Souventirs de Notre Tour du Monde de Hugues Krafft. Bulletin de La Société Des Amis Du Vieux Reims, 32–39.
- Cheishvili, A. (2017). A la découverte de Bakou, Voyages de Hugues Krafft dans le Caucase // Discovering Bakou, Hugues Krafft's journeys to the Caucasus. Catalogue de l'exposition tenue au Musée-hôtel Le Vergeur du 25 novembre 2017 au 4 février 2018. TEAS Press Publishing House. ISBN 978-9952-520-53-8.
- Cheishvili, A.; Pichon C. (2018). Hugues Krafft à travers le Caucase : une collection photographique inédite. Regards sur notre patrimoine, revue semestrielle publié par la Société des Amis du Vieux Reims. n°41. pp. 3–12. ISSN 1283-5447.
- Chu, P. T.-D., & Dixon, L. S. (2008). Twenty-first-century perspectives on nineteenth-century art: Essays in honor of Gabriel P. Weisberg. University of Delaware.
- Esmein, S. (2003). Hugues Krafft au Japon de Meiji: Photographies d’un voyage, 1882-1883. Hermann.
- Ladam, N. (2008). Le Japon de Krafft, 1882-1883: Une rencontre entre Orient et Occident : Musée Le Vergeur [Université de Reims Champagne-Ardenne]. http://catalogue.bnf.fr/ark:/12148/cb42779076t

== Bibliography ==
- Anglo-American Name Authority File, s.v. “Krafft, Hugues”, LC Control Number n 88619670. Accessed 27 March 2007.
- Esmein, Suzanne. Hugues Krafft au Japon de Meiji: photographies d'un voyage, 1882–1883 (in French) (Paris : Hermann, 2003). .
- Ladam, Nicolas. Le Voyage d'Hugues Krafft au Soleil Levant. Pratiques du voyage et représentations du Japon d'un grand bourgeois français dans les années 1880, mémoire de Master d'Histoire soutenu à l'université de Reims Champagne-Ardenne, sous la direction de Catherine Nicault, 2008. Available for free here (in French)
