= Koishikawa =

Town located in Bunkyō-ku, Tokyo

Coordinates: 35°42′54″N 139°44′44″E

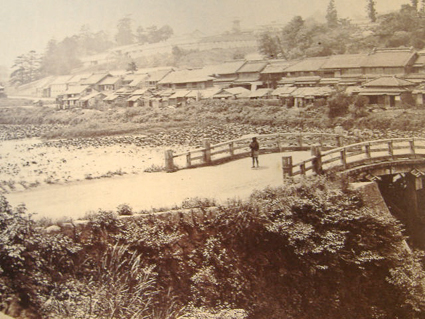
19th-century view of Koishikawa ("東京小石川遠景").

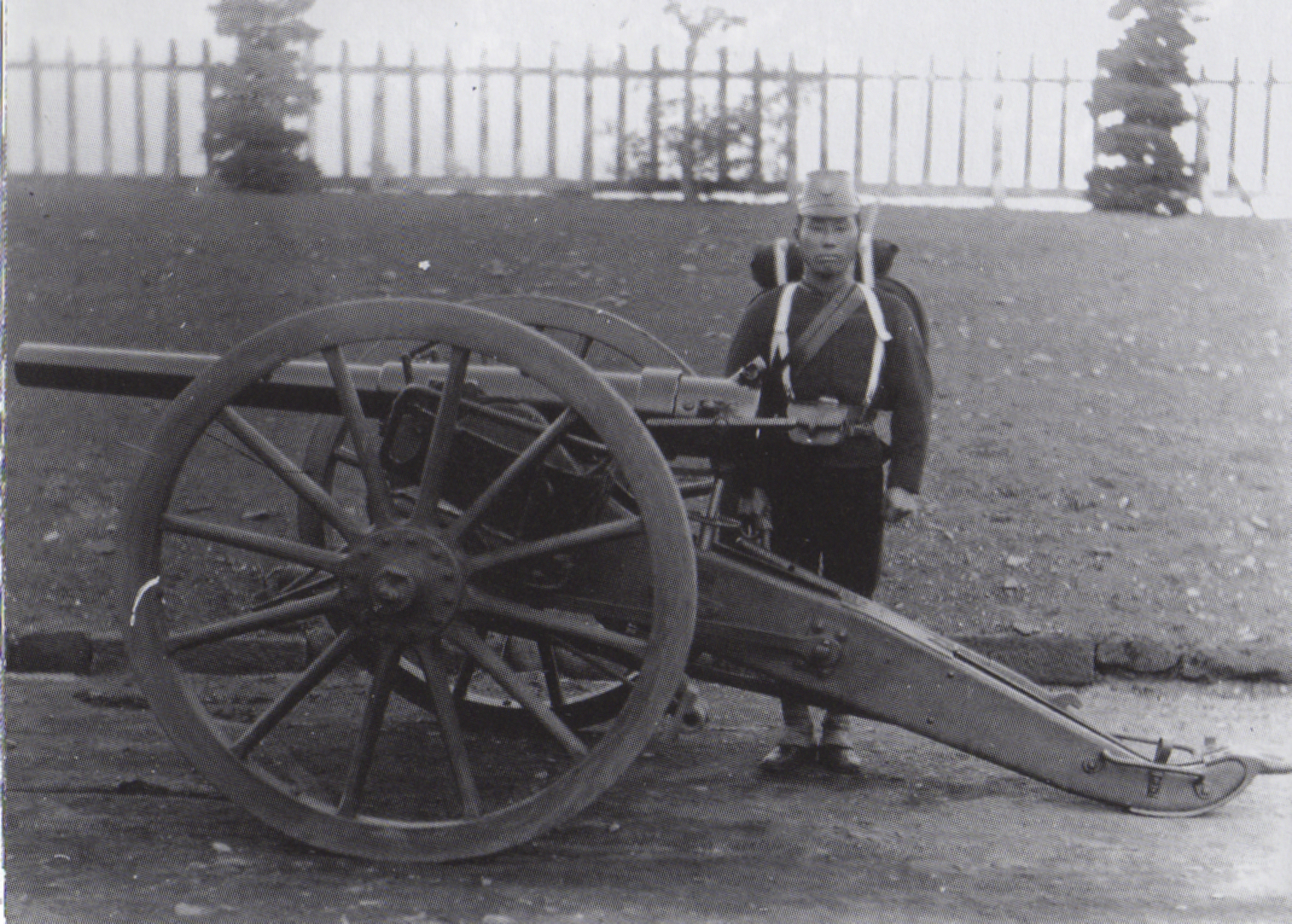
Japanese artillery unit, at the Koishikawa Arsenal, Tokyo, in 1882. Photographed by Hugues Krafft.

Koishikawa (小石川) is a district of Bunkyo, Tokyo. It consists of five sub-areas, 1-5 chome (1~5丁目). In Koishikawa are located two well regarded gardens: the Koishikawa Botanical Garden (operated by the University of Tokyo) in Hakusan, and the Koishikawa Korakuen Garden in Kōraku.

Train stations for accessing this locality include Hakusan Station (白山駅, Hakusan-eki), Kōrakuen Station (後楽園駅, Kōrakuen-eki), Kasuga Station (春日駅, Kasuga-eki), and Myōgadani Station (茗荷谷駅, Myōgadani-eki).

The Koishikawa Arsenal was an important military installation during the Meiji era.

== Education ==
Bunkyo operates the local public elementary and middle schools.

Zoned elementary schools are: Kanatomi (金富小学校), Kubomachi (窪町小学校), Rekisen (礫川小学校), and Yanagicho (柳町小学校).

Zoned junior high schools are: No. 1 (第一中学校), No. 3 (第三中学校), and Meidai (茗台中学校).

Koishikawa High School is operated by the Tokyo Metropolitan Government Board of Education. In addition the metropolis operates the Koishikawa Secondary Education School.

== Gallery ==
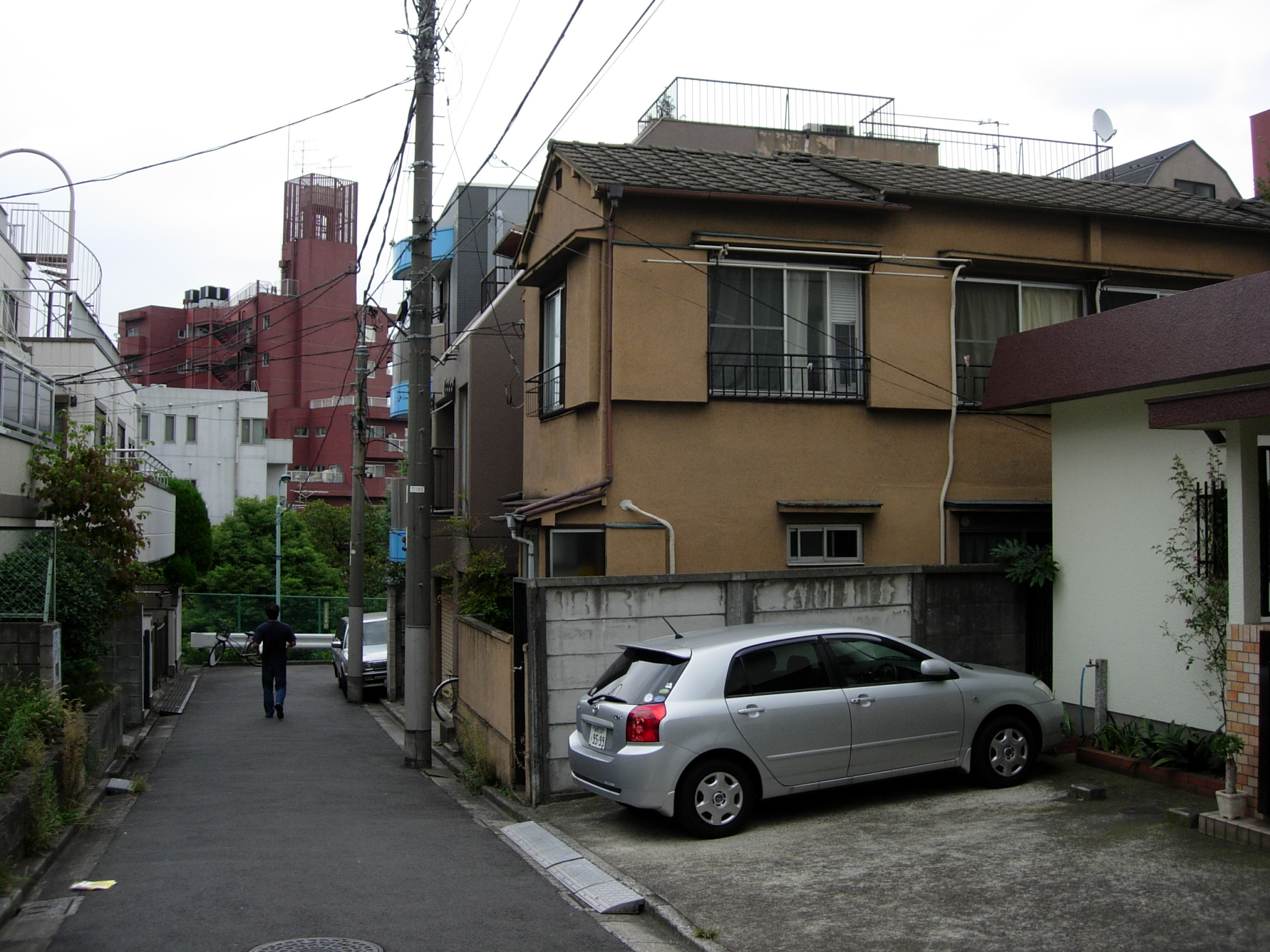
Residential street in Koishikawa

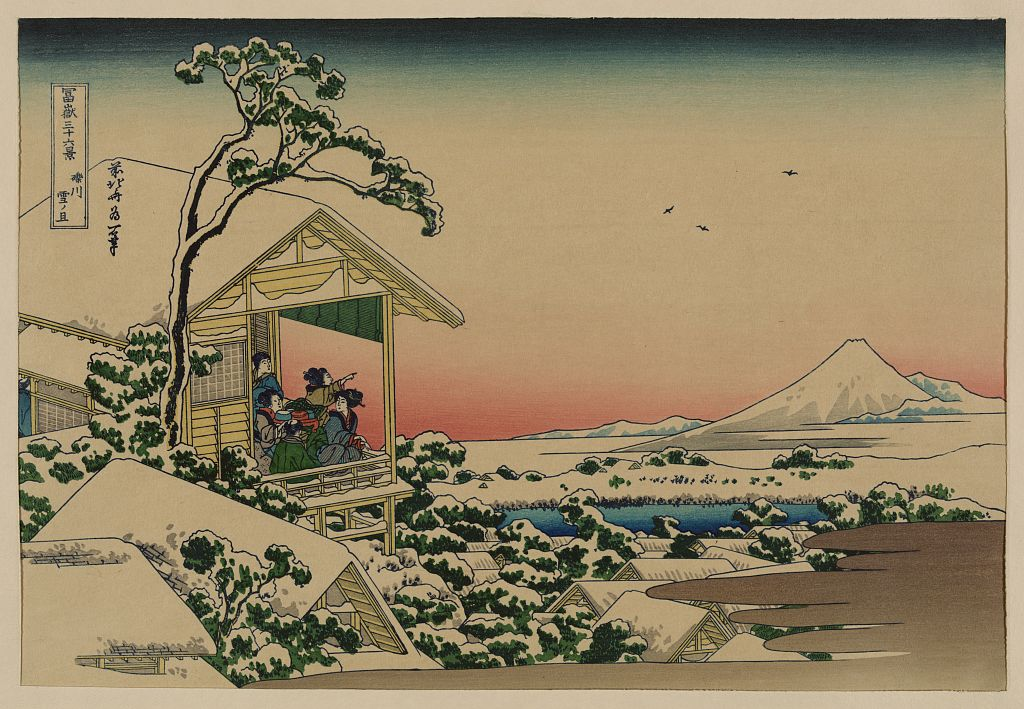
Hokusai print

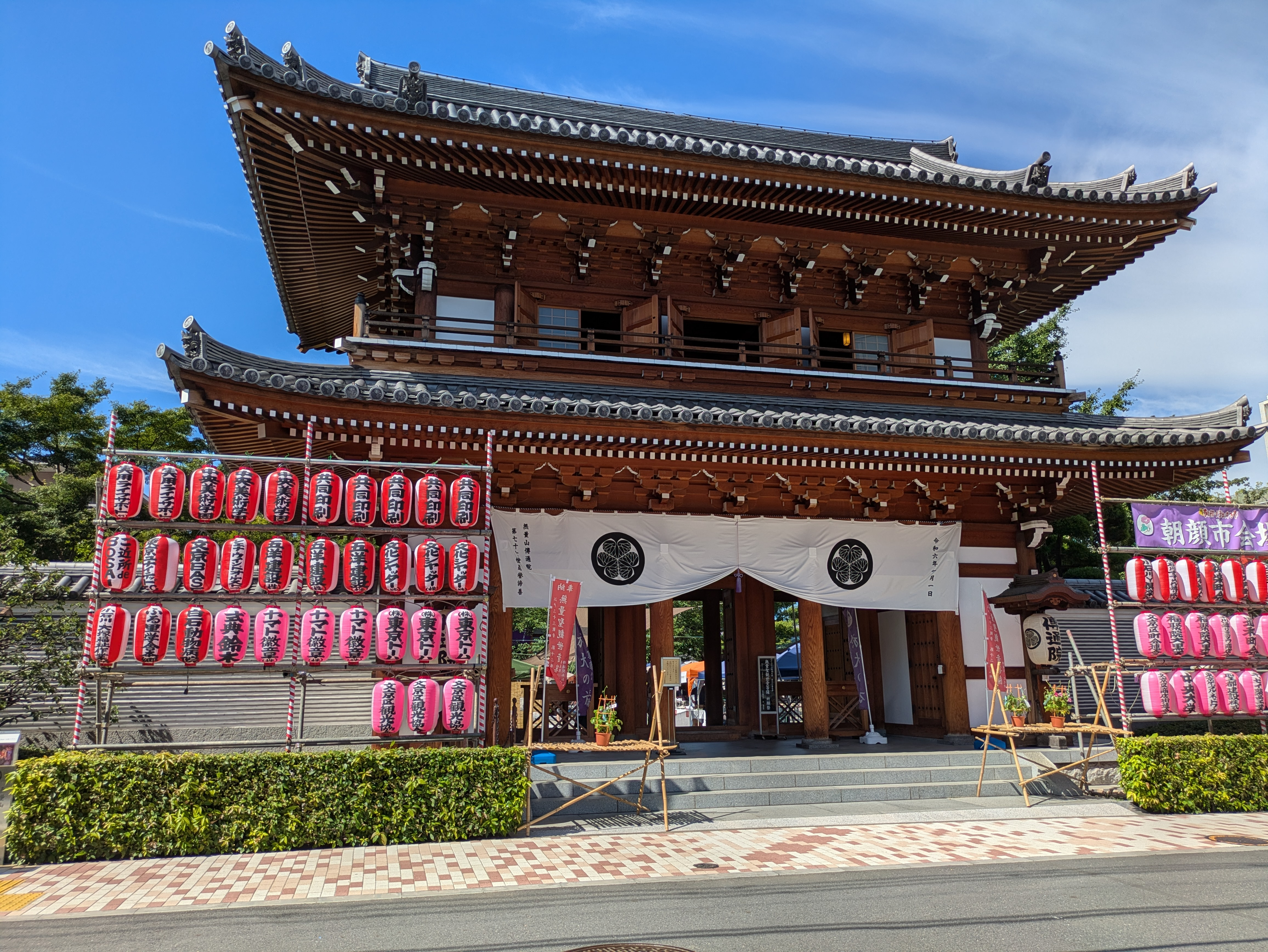
Sanmon of Denzū-in

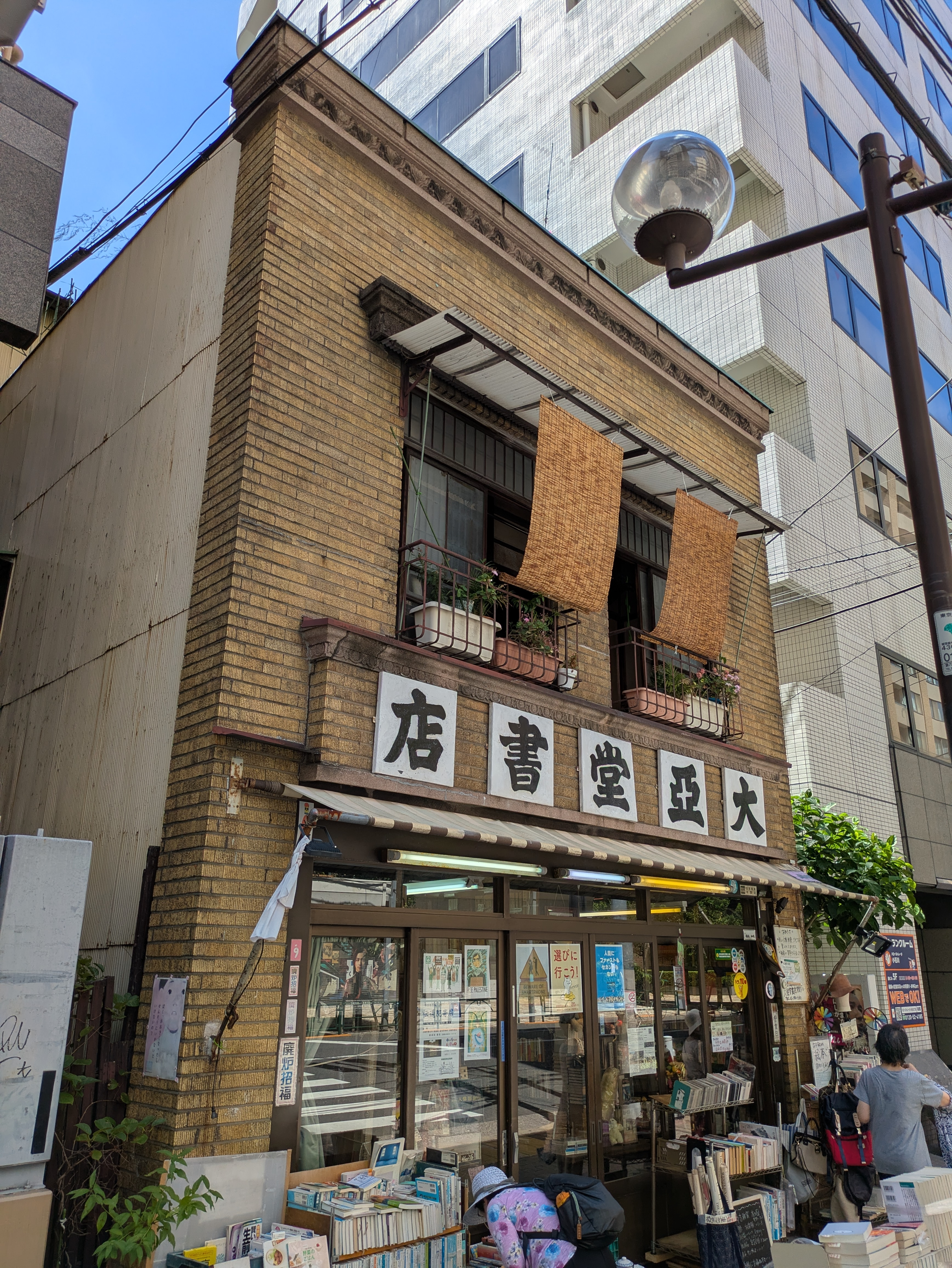
A used bookstore, 大亜堂書店 (Taiadō Shoten) built in 1932
