= Type 38 rifle =

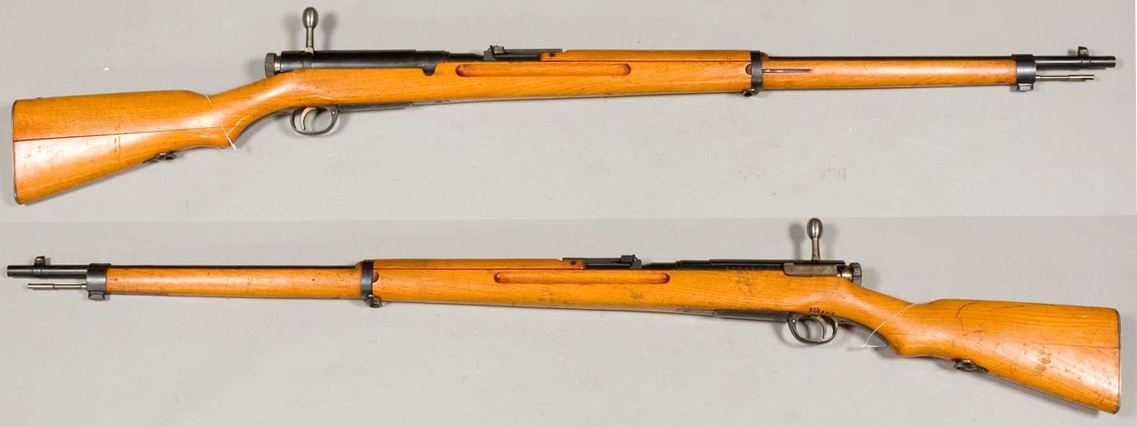
- Type 38 rifle from the collections of the Swedish Army Museum
- Type: Bolt-action rifle
- Place of origin: Empire of Japan

Service history
- In service: 1906–1945 (Japan)
- Used by: See Users
- Wars: Mexican Revolution; Mexican Border War; World War I Russian Civil War; Spanish Civil War; February 26th Incident; Second Sino-Japanese War; World War II; Chinese Civil War; Indonesian National Revolution; Malayan Emergency; Korean War; First Indochina War; Vietnam War

Production history
- Designed: 1905
- No. built: Rifles: 2,999,200; Carbines: 579,300; Other variants: 403,000
- Variants: See Variants

Specifications
- Mass: Rifle: 4.19 kg (9.2 lb); Carbine: 3.3 kg (7.3 lb)
- Length: Rifle: 1,275 mm (50.2 in); Carbine: 966 mm (38.0 in)
- Barrel length: Rifle: 797 mm (31.4 in); Carbine: 487 mm (19.2 in)
- Cartridge: 6.5×50mm Arisaka; 7.62×39mm (post-war Chinese modified); 7.92×57mm Mauser (Chinese modified).303 British (Estonian modified)
- Action: Bolt action
- Rate of fire: 10–15 rounds per minute
- Muzzle velocity: 762 m/s (2,500 ft/s)
- Effective firing range: 366–457 m (400–500 yd) (with iron sight)
- Maximum firing range: 2.37 km (1.47 mi)
- Feed system: 5-round stripper clip

The Type 38 rifle (三八式歩兵銃, sanhachi-shiki hoheijū) is a bolt-action service rifle that was used by the Empire of Japan predominantly during the Second Sino-Japanese War and Second World War. The design was adopted by the Imperial Japanese Army in 1905 (the 38th year of the Meiji period, hence "Type 38"). Due to a perceived lack of power in its 6.5×50mmSR Arisaka cartridge, it was partially replaced during World War II with the 7.7×58mm Arisaka Type 99 rifle, but both rifles saw usage until the end of the war.

== History and development ==
The Imperial Japanese Army introduced the Type 30 rifle in 1897. However, the weapon had numerous shortcomings, which were highlighted by combat experience in the early stages of the Russo-Japanese War. These included bursting cartridges, a poorly designed lock in which excess gunpowder tended to accumulate, burning the face of the shooter, frequent misfires, jamming, difficulty in cleaning, and cartridge extraction. Major Kijiro Nambu undertook a redesign of the Type 30, which was introduced in 1906. Nambu reduced the number of parts making up the Type 30's bolt from nine to six and at that same time simplified manufacture and disassembly of the bolt without the need for tools. A dust cover was added because of experiences in the Russo-Japanese War that left rifles inoperable from dust. The weapon was produced in several locations:

- Tokyo Arsenal from 1906 to 1932; 2,029,000 units (est.)
- Kokura Arsenal from 1937 to 1941: 495,500 units (est.)
- Nagoya Arsenal from 1932 to 1942: 312,500 units (est.)
- Jinsen (in what is now Incheon) arsenal during 1942: 13,400 units (est.)
- Hoten (was called Mukden Arsenal before the Japanese took it over. In what is now Shenyang) arsenal from 1937 to 1944: 148,800 units (est.)

In 1939, the Type 38 rifle manufactured by these arsenals cost 75.9 yen per unit. By 1940 more than three million Type 38s had been issued to the Imperial Japanese Army. However, a concern that the 6.5×50mmSR Arisaka cartridge did not compare favorably to the ammunition used by the other great powers in the war led to the introduction of a further generation of rifles in 1939, during the Second Sino-Japanese War. Designated the Type 99 rifle, this new rifle used the more powerful 7.7×58mm Arisaka cartridge already in use with the Type 92 heavy machine gun and the Type 97 light machine gun. However, not all units received the new weapon, and the mixture of types with incompatible cartridges led to considerable logistics issues during World War II.

During the Korean War, both North and South Korea issued the Type 38 to second-line units and security personnel. In contrast, the Type 38 served as one of the main service rifles for the Chinese forces, alongside the Hanyang 88 and the Chiang Kai-shek rifle. It is confirmed that the Type 38 served as the standard service rifle for several Chinese divisions, including the 114th, 120th, 126th, 150th, 196th, and 197th Divisions.

== Variants ==
The Type 38 rifle used the 6.5×50mm Arisaka cartridge. This cartridge produces little recoil when fired. However, while on par with the Norwegian and Italian 6.5 mm military cartridges of the time, the 6.5×50mm was not as powerful as several others in use by other nations. The Type 38 at 128 cm (50.4 in) was the longest rifle of the war, due to the emphasis on bayonet training for the Japanese soldier of the era, whose average height was 160 centimeters (5 ft 3 in). The rifle was even longer when the 40 cm (15.75 inches) Type 30 bayonet was fixed. The Type 38 was fairly heavy, at about 4.25 kg.

Post-war inspection of the Type 38 by the U.S. military and the National Rifle Association of America found that the Type 38's receiver was the strongest bolt action of any nation's and capable of handling more powerful cartridges.

Nomenclature note: In the West, Japanese equipment is commonly referred to as "Type XX", rather than "Model XX". In the case of a firearm, "model" is a more accurate interpretation of the SHIKI (式) character, but the word "type" has become well-established by collectors for decades.

=== Type 38 short rifle ===
In the late 1930s to the early 1940s, an unknown number of Type 38 rifles were converted into short rifles at Nagoya Arsenal, that did all rebuilds of Type 38 and Type 44 rifles and carbines. The barrels were shortened to 635 mm (25.0 in) from the standard 794 mm (31.3 in) barrel and the stock shortened to match the barrel while the handguard retained its original length. The result is a Type 38 which is similar in size to the Arisaka Type 99 short rifle. There is no consistency to serial numbers or arsenal marks as the rifles were converted from existing stock. Although total production is unknown, it is estimated that approximately 100,000 were converted.

=== Type 38 carbine ===
Intended for use by cavalry, engineers, and other roles where a full sized rifle would be a hindrance, the Type 38 carbine was introduced into service at the same time as the standard Type 38. Its barrel was 487 millimeters (19.2 in), overall length 966 millimeters (38.0 in), and weight 3.3 kilograms (7.3 lb). The carbine lacked a bayonet and the cost in 1939 was 67.9 yen per unit. It was produced in a number of locations:

- Tokyo Arsenal from 1906 to 1931; 209,500 units (est.)
- Kokura arsenal from 1938 to 1941: 51,500 units (est.)
- Nagoya arsenal from 1935 to 1942: 206,500 units (est.)
- Hoten/Mukden arsenal from 1937 to 1944: 52,300 units (est.)

=== Type 44 carbine ===
Similar to the Type 38 carbine from the middle band back. The Type 44 cavalry carbine is almost entirely different from the middle band forward with an under-folding bayonet, metal nosecap, stacking hook to the left side of the nosecap and wide front sight guards. This model was introduced in 1911. There are three variations of this rifle. Each variation based entirely on the nosecap size and the spacing of the nosecap screws. They have a unique storage compartment in the buttstock for a cleaning rod. These additional features increased the cost of the carbine to 86.2 yen per unit by 1939. It was produced in three arsenals:

- Tokyo Arsenal from 1912 to 1932; 56,900 units (est.)
- Kokura arsenal from 1935 to 1941: 21,800 units (est.)
- Nagoya arsenal from 1935 to 1942: 14,300 units (est.)

=== Type 97 sniper rifle ===
As with the standard Type 38, but with a rifle scope with 2.5x magnification, the Type 97 was introduced in 1937. The scope was offset to allow loading by stripper clip and bolt handle slightly bent down. Some 22,500 were produced.

=== Chinese six/five infantry rifle ===
Chinese copy of the Japanese Type 38 at the Taiyuan Arsenal in the very late 1920s to early 1930s for the warlord of Shanxi province, General Yan Xishan. The receiver is marked "six-five rifle" (六五步槍). Estimated to have been 108,000 made.

=== Type 918 rifle ===
These copies of the Type 38 rifles are believed to have been manufactured at the South Manchuria Army Arsenal (also known as the 918 Arsenal), but very little is known about them. Chinese sources state that these rifles were made in China for Japan, but for whom it is not known. It does not bear the Japanese Imperial Chrysanthemum, but instead has a heart symbol and under it written "918 Type" (九一八式). It is also not known if these were made before or right after the surrender of Japanese forces. It has an under-folding bayonet similar to the Japanese Type 44. The 918 stamped on top of the receivers stands for the date of September 18, 1931; the date of the Mukden Incident.

=== North China Type 19 carbine ===
A relatively crude mix of the Type 38 and Type 99 that is believed to have been made mostly in the Chinese city of Tientsin and may have been intended for puppet troops. The Type 19 is in 6.5 Japanese, unlike its predecessor, the North China Type 30 carbine copy which is in 8mm Mauser. Like the North China Type 30, it has a cherry blossom on the breech instead of the Japanese Imperial Chrysanthemum, and is marked with "North China Type 19" (北支一九式) above the cherry blossom unlike the North China Type 30. The 19 may mean the 19th year of Showa Era or 1944. The true military designation is unknown. Approximately 43,000 carbines are thought to have been produced.

=== Siamese Type 66 long rifle ===
Siam (Thailand) ordered 50,000 Type 38 rifles in 1924 from the Tokyo Army Arsenal chambered in their Type 66 8x52mmR cartridge. The receiver is marked with the Siamese Charkra with "Type 66" (แบบ ๖๖) written under it. Not only was the caliber changed, but the sights, bayonet and cleaning rod are different than the Japanese version. Almost all parts, including screws cannot be interchanged with the Japanese Type 38.

=== Thai Type 83 rifle ===
Unlike the Siamese Type 66 (แบบ ๖๖), this rifle is a standard Japanese Type 38 in 6.5x50mmSR that was sent as aid from Japan to Thailand in 1940. These were taken straight from assembly lines at Nagoya and Kokura arsenals, after the Japanese Imperial Chrysanthemum was canceled out by zeros along the petals. In Thailand they called it the Type 83 (แบบ ๘๓). These rifles were issued to second-line troops to free up rifles in their main caliber from front line duties for the Franco-Thai War. Later in the 1950s, some of these rifles had their barrels and stocks cut down to short rifle length with many of those being rechambered for .30-06 Type 88 cartridge and becoming Type Type 83/88s (แบบ ๘๓/๘๘). Very few of these rifles were imported into the United States because of the Gun Control Act of 1968 restricting former military arms from entering the country.

=== Thai Type 91 police carbine ===
Made after World War II, these carbines were made in Thailand at the Royal Thai Arsenals in Bangkok from Type 38 parts for a handy carbine for police. The stock and barrel was cut down. The stocks were cut out like a M1 carbine stock and used M1 carbine slings and oilers. Some bolts were turned down, some not. Some had the Royal Thai Police symbol stamped on the receiver with "91" (๙๑) stamped above it and some received the Siamese Charkra stamped on the receiver. They all retained their original Japanese caliber of 6.5x50sr.

=== Mexican Model 1913 rifle and carbine ===
Ordered in mid 1913 by the Huerta government in the standard Mexican military caliber, 7×57mm Mauser, for 50,000 rifles and later for another 25,000 carbines from the Tokyo Artillery Arsenal. They were made to fit the Mexican Mauser model 1895, 1902 or 1910 bayonets. Due to the Mexican Revolution, Japan instead sold them to Russia. The breech had the Mexican crest under "Republica Mexicana" where the Japanese Imperial Chrysanthemum would be on a Type 38 Arisaka. Early Model 1913s did not have three interlocking circles instead of the Mexican crest as reported in The Type 38 Arisaka (2007), with an early Model 1913 shown to have the Mexican crest.

=== Estonian KL .303 ===
Estonian conversion of the standard Type 38 to the .303 British cartridge, intended for usage by second line troops of the Estonian Defence League. A total of 24,000 rifles were rebored during 1929–1934.

=== 7.62x39 conversion ===
After World War II, Type 38s captured from the IJA were converted to use the 7.62×39mm cartridge by the People's Republic of China since the PLA was being equipped with AK and SKS rifles in that caliber during the 1950s.

Two versions of the converted Type 38s consisted of rifles with just a SKS barrel or of a SKS barrel with a front stock cap and folding bayonet.

== Users ==
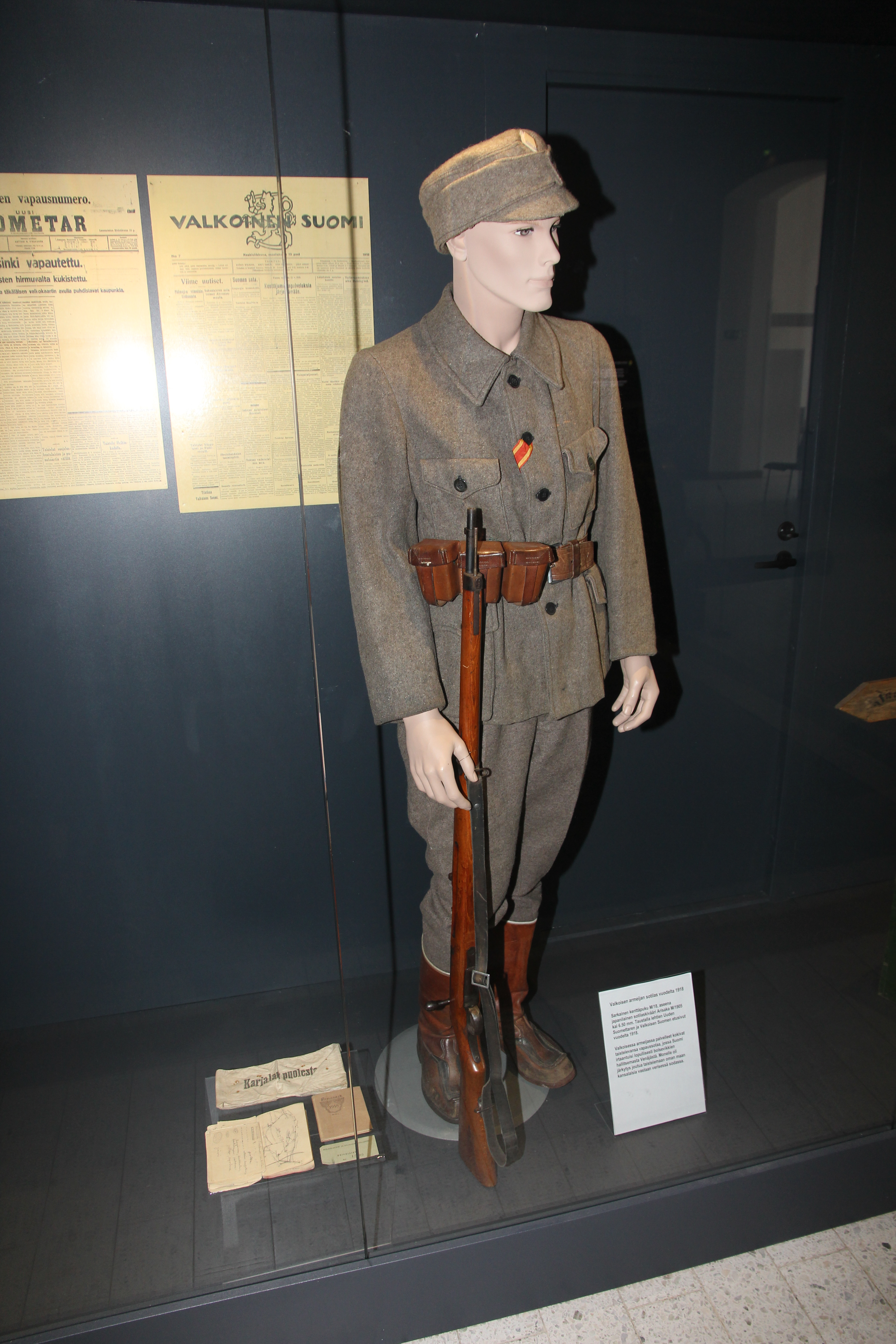
Finnish Civil War White Guard soldiers were equipped with 6.5 mm M/1905 (Type 38 Arisaka) rifles.

- Austria-Hungary: Used captured Russian examples during World War I.
- China: In service during the Chinese Civil War and the Korean War. Was previously in service as the Type 65 with the People's Militia in the 1960s.
- Republic of China: Japan sent more than 200,000 Type 38 rifles and carbines to China in 1917–1918, including 125,000 to the central government. The delivery to various warlords continued in the 1920s. The Whampoa Military Academy obtained Type 38s from the Soviet Union as military aid, as did Feng Yu-hsiang's warlord army. The pro-Japanese Collaborationist Chinese Army also received Type 38 rifles in the 1940s while many more rifles were captured by anti-Japanese forces. Chinese copies were also locally produced.
- Estonia: A total of 2,400 Type 38 rifles provided by Finland were converted to .303 British for the Estonian Defence League. Designated the KL18.
- Finland: Ex-Russian stock
- Indonesia: Captured Japanese weapons after Japan's World War II surrender and used them in the Indonesian Independence War.
- Empire of Japan: 3.5 million from 1906 to 1944
- Malaysia: Used by the Malayan Communist Party in the Malayan Emergency
- Manchukuo: the cavalry of the Manchukuo Imperial Army received 50,000 Type 38 carbines in 1935 while the front-line infantry was re-equipped with Type 38 rifles between 1935 and the early 1940s
- Myanmar: used by the Burmese Independence Army. Used by the Myanmar Army till 1960s.
- North Korea
- Philippines: Filipino guerrillas used captured Type 38 rifles. A handful remained in military and police armories which saw limited use in CAT, ROTC, and military academies.
  - Hukbalahap: Utilized captured rifles from the Japanese occupation and continued using these in limited numbers during the early phase of the Hukbalahap Rebellion.
- Second Polish Republic: Ex-Russian stocks of Arisaka Type 30 (c.1897AD), Type 35 (c.1902AD) and Type 38 (c.1905AD) rifles and carbines. The Arisaka Type 38 rifle was classified as the karabin japoński wz.05 Arisaka and the Arisaka Type 38 Carbine was the karabinek japoński wz.05 Arisaka. They were issued to police, border guards and paramilitary militia formations.
- Russian Empire: During World War I, bought the remaining 35,400 rifles originally intended for Mexico, and also received 128,000 Type 30 and 38 rifles from Britain in 1916. This in addition to about 600,000 in 6.5 mm ordered directly from Japan.
- South Korea: Provided to Korean Constabulary in January 1946 as service rifle by the United States Army Military Government in Korea. The Armed Forces were equipped with 9,593 Type 38 rifles before the Korean War.
- Spanish Republic: Used Japanese and Mexican variants sourced from the USSR during the Spanish Civil War. Some examples were converted to 8mm Mauser.
- United Kingdom: Bought a mixed batch of 150,000 Type 30 and Type 38 rifles from Japan at the start of World War I to equip the Royal Navy, freeing up Lee-Enfield rifles for the British Army. Most were used by training battalions and the rifles were declared obsolete in 1921 According to another source, Japanese exports of this model were much greater: 500,000 to Great Britain and 620,000 to Russia.
- Vietnam: Captured rifles seized from the troops of Japanese occupation troops in Indochina, and later used by the Viet Minh during the war in Indochina with France. A clone was made to be chambered in 7.62x25mm for five rounds.

== Gallery ==
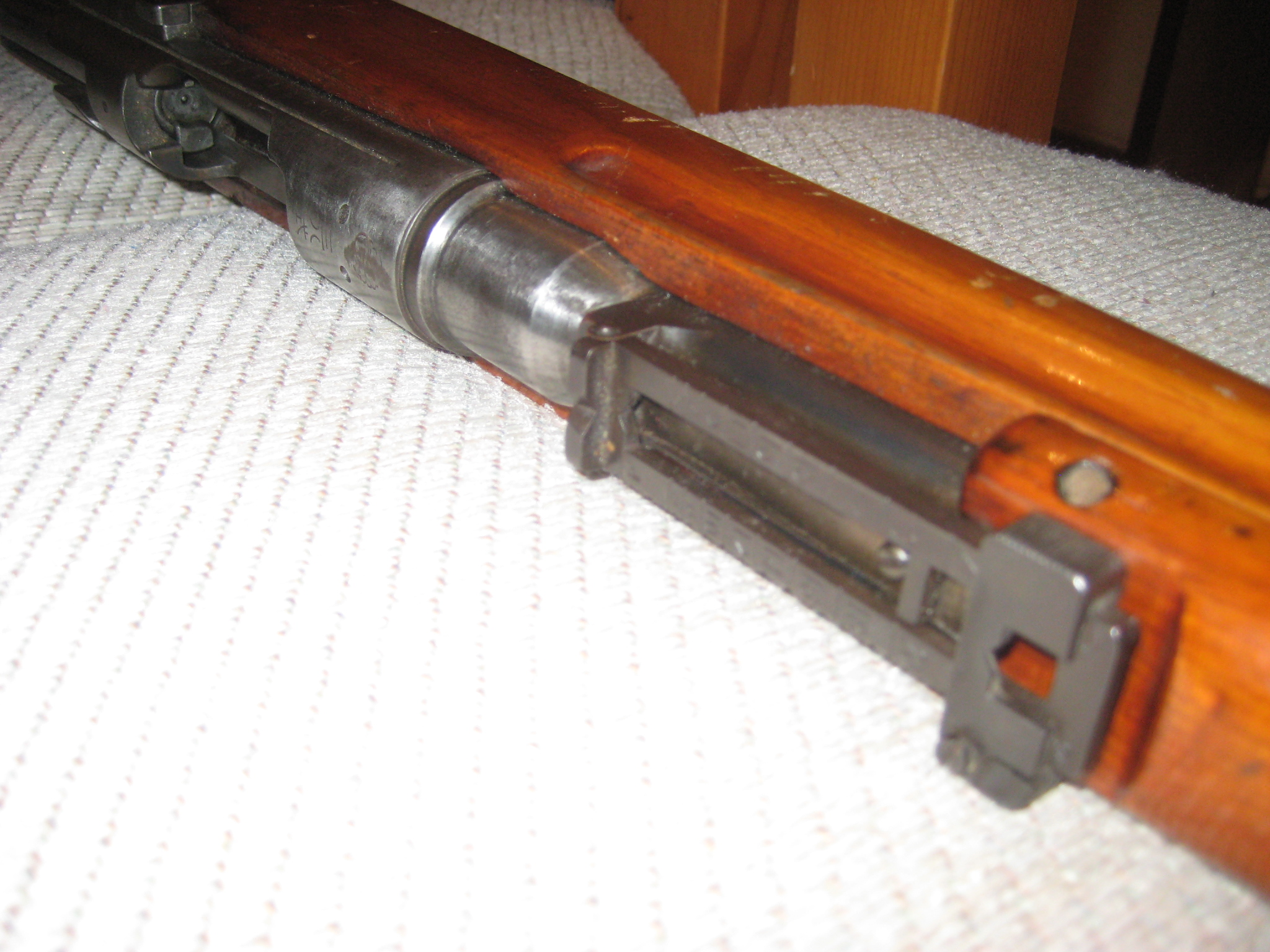
Detail of rear sight of a Japanese Arisaka Type 38 rifle

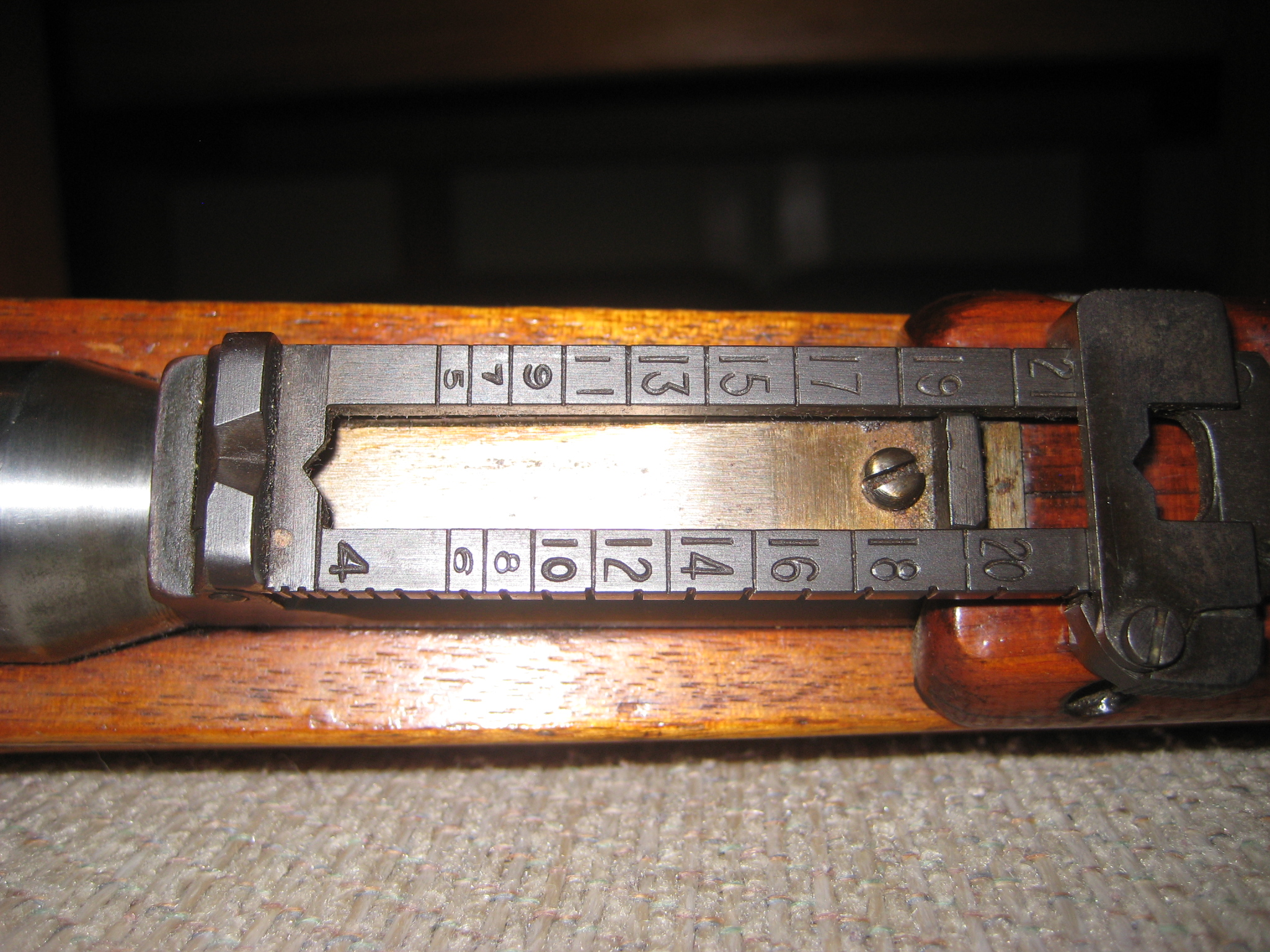
Top view of the rear sight on a Japanese Arisaka Type 38 rifle

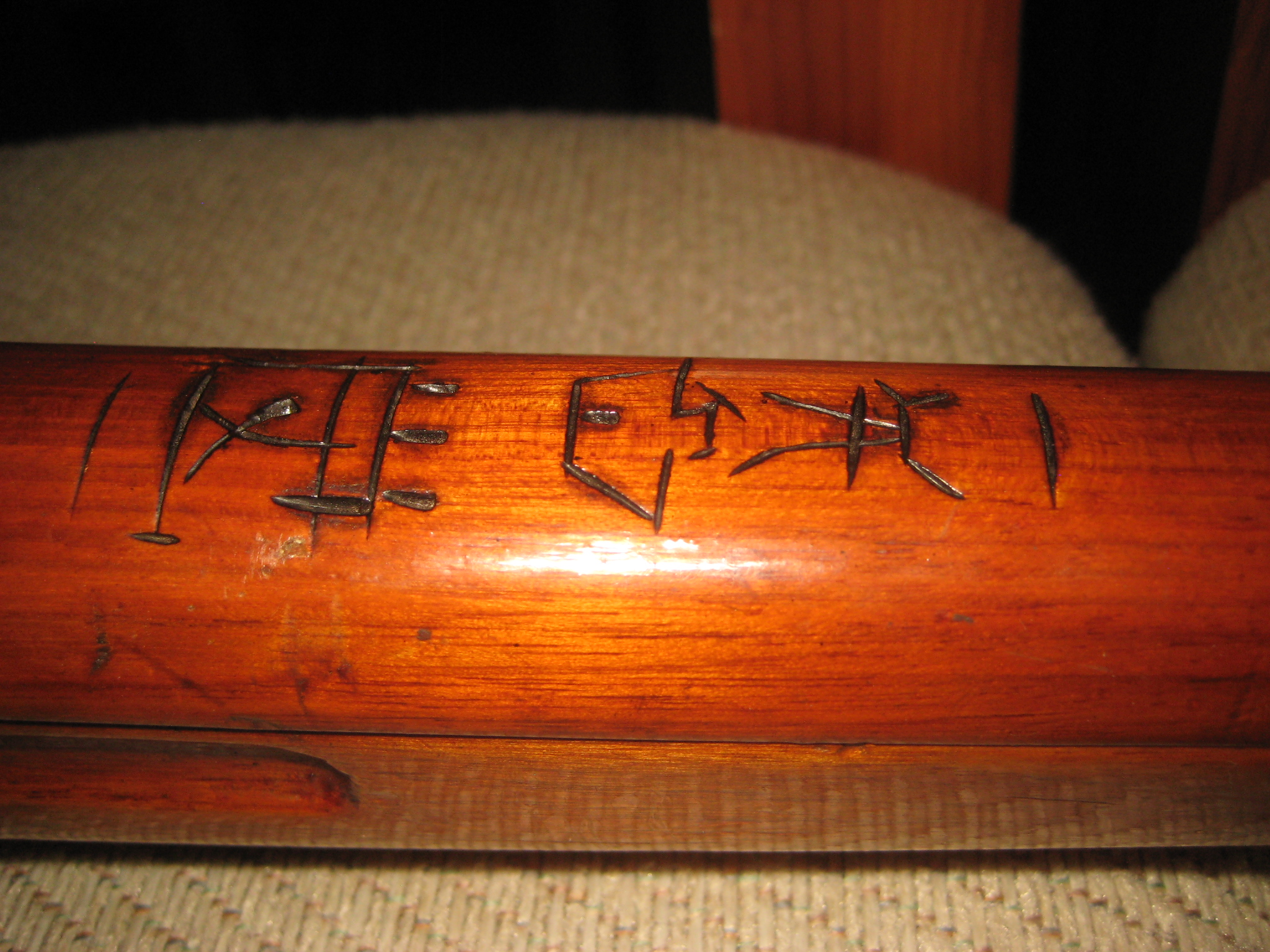
Inscriptions on the upper handguard of a Japanese Arisaka Type 38 rifle

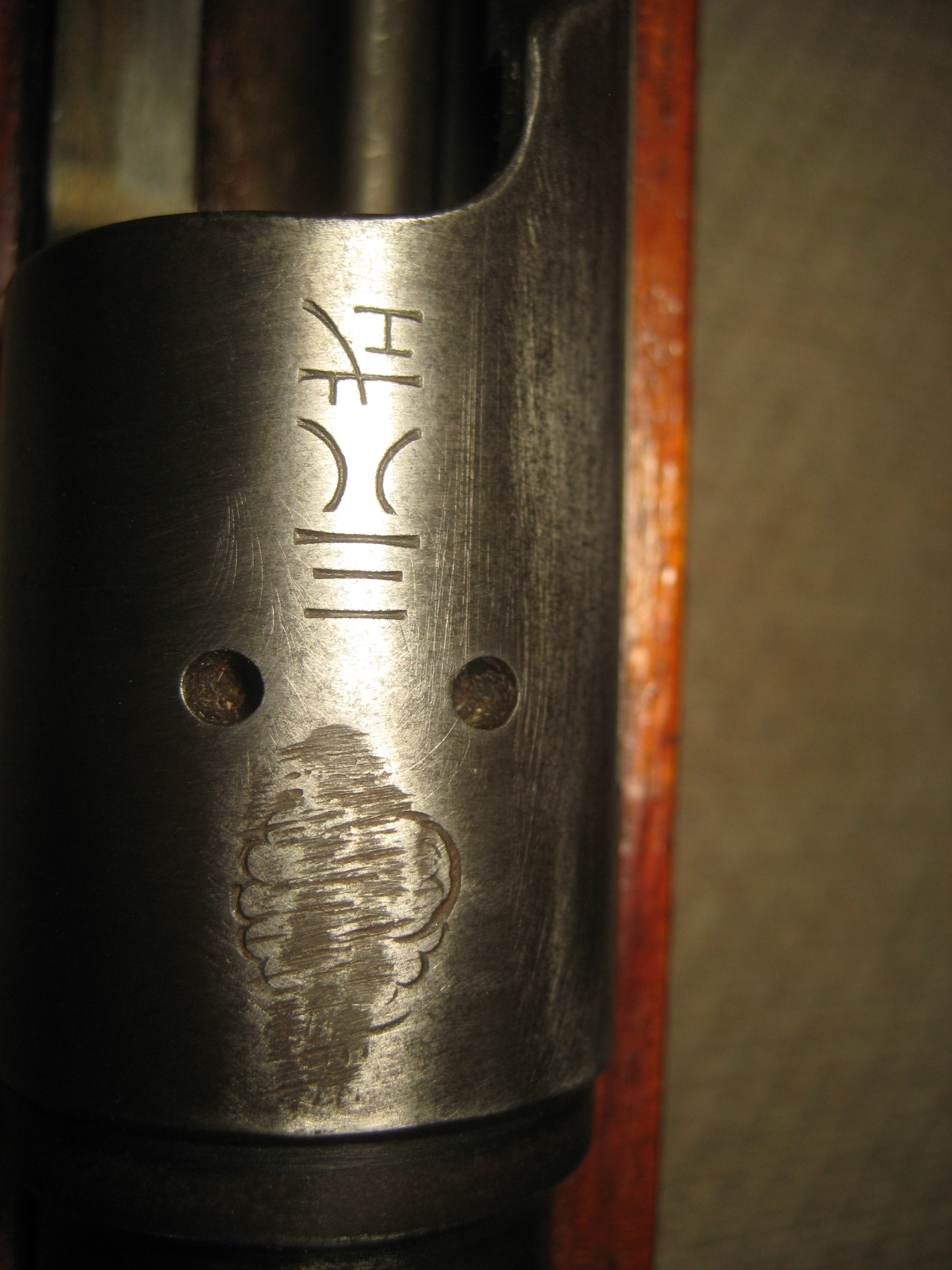
Inscriptions found on top part of receiver of a Japanese Arisaka Type 38 rifle (the "Imperial Chrysanthemum" is ground out)

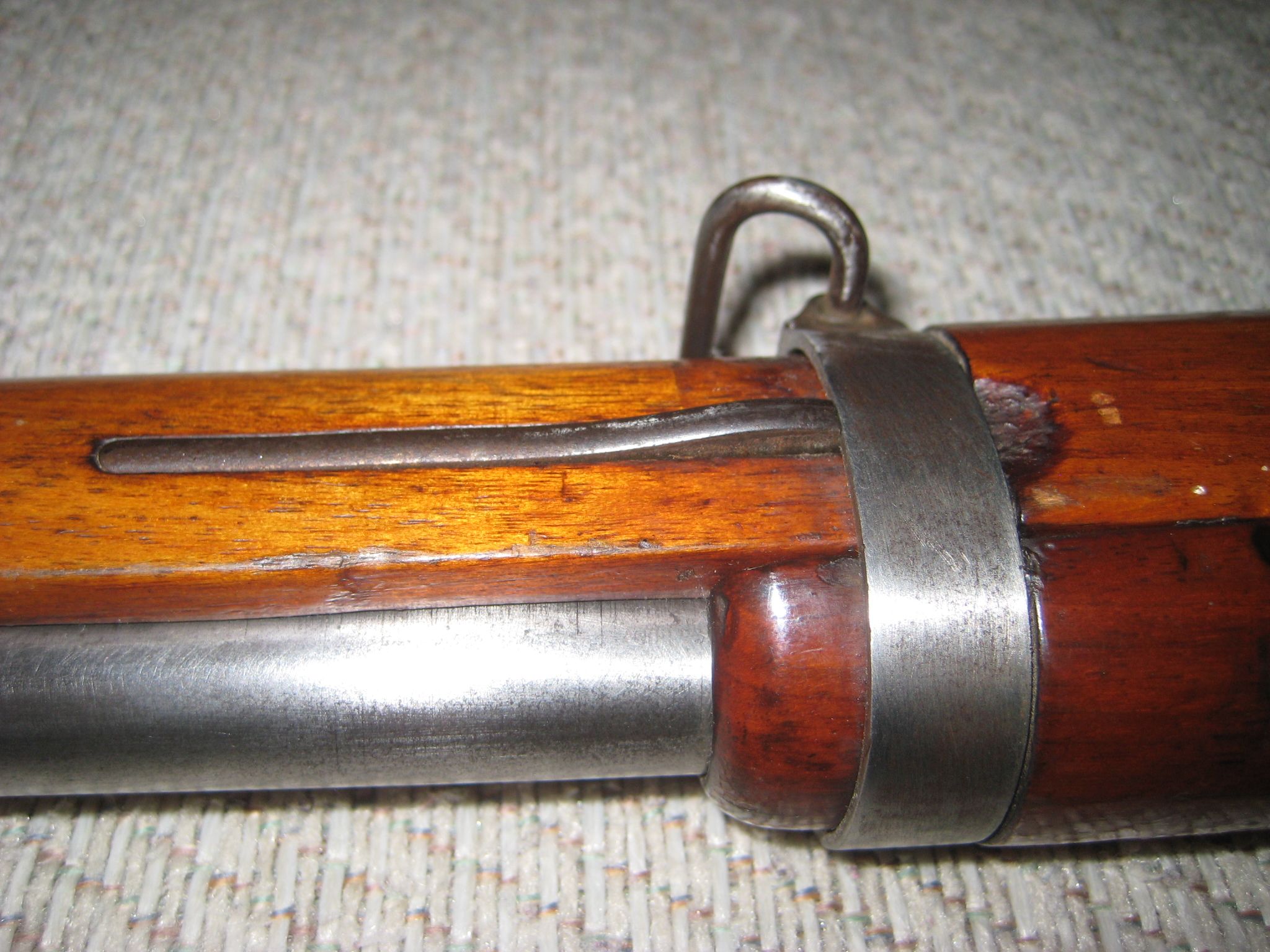
Detail of the front stock of a Japanese Arisaka Type 38 rifle

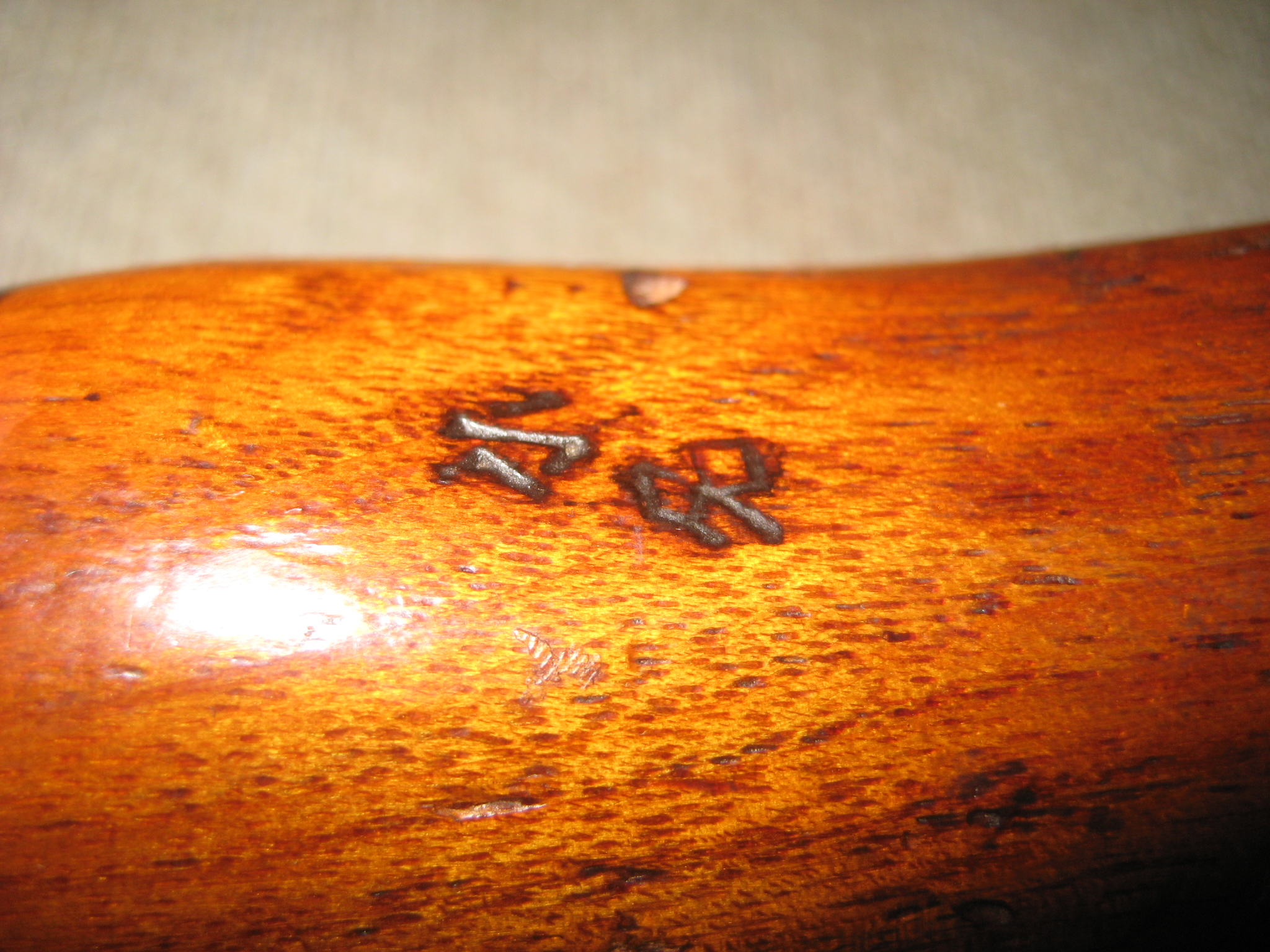
Detail of the rear stock inscriptions on a Japanese Arisaka Type 38 rifle
