= Koishikawa Arsenal =

Former arsenal in Tokyo, Japan

Coordinates: 35°42′20″N 139°44′57″E

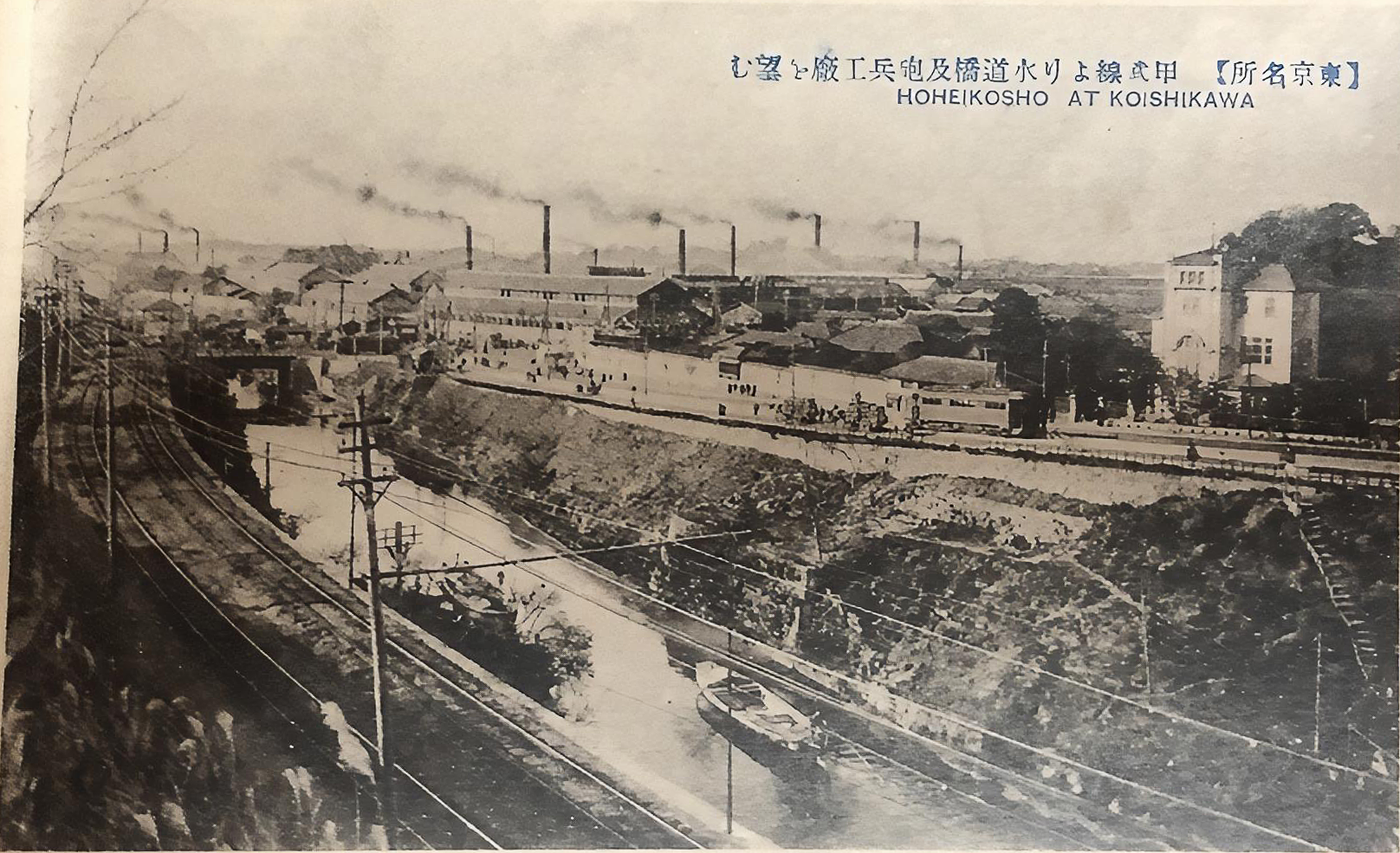
- Koishikawa Arsenal in Tokyo, circa 1920
- Built: 1871
- Location: Koishikawa, Tokyo, Japan
- Industry: Armament
- Defunct: 1935

The Koishikawa Arsenal (小石川工廠, Koishikawa Kōshō), formally Imperial Japanese Army Tokyo Arsenal (日本帝国陸軍東京砲兵工廠, Nippon Teikoku Rikugun Tokyo Hōheikōshō) was an arsenal in the Koishikawa area of Tokyo, on the grounds of today's Tokyo Dome City and the Koishikawa Kōrakuen Garden. It was located on the site of the former residence of the lords of the Mito Domain.

== History ==
The arsenal was inaugurated in 1871, soon after the Meiji restoration. One of its main early productions was the Murata rifle, the first locally produced Japanese rifle. As of 1893, it was producing about 200 rifles and 200,000 cartridges daily. The arsenal was especially active between the two World Wars, as the Arisaka rifle was produced there. The arsenal also produced licensed Mauser style rifles based on the Gewehr 98 for the military of Siam (now Thailand).

The arsenal began producing airplanes after World War I for the Japanese army, and also for the Imperial Russian Army, which placed an order for 10 airplanes before 1916.

Discipline and organization at the arsenal are thought to have been extremely strict, leading to the development of labor disputes in which the Koishikawa arsenal took a leading role in Japan.

After the First World War, the Imperial Japanese Army Institute of Science was established within the Koishikawa arsenal. In 1937, the Number Nine Research Laboratory was established as a breakaway unit from this station.

The arsenal suffered considerable destruction during the Great Kantō earthquake on 1 September 1923. Complete reconstruction was deemed too expensive, so that the arsenal was transferred to Kokura in Kyūshū (小倉工廠) in October 1935, after 66 years of operation.

== Gallery ==
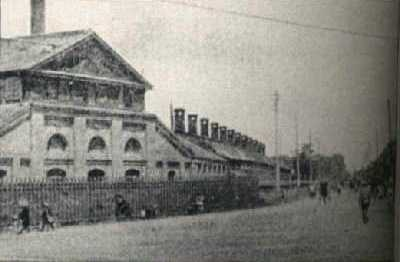
Old Koishikawa Arsenal, circa 1890

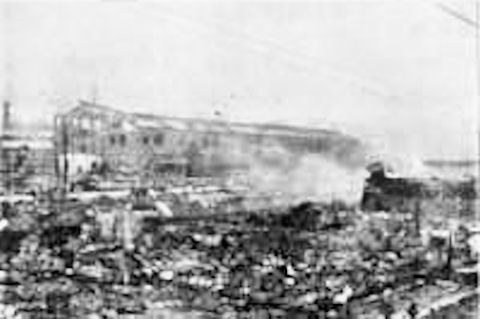
Destruction of the old Tokyo Koishikawa Arsenal in the Great Kantō earthquake in 1923.

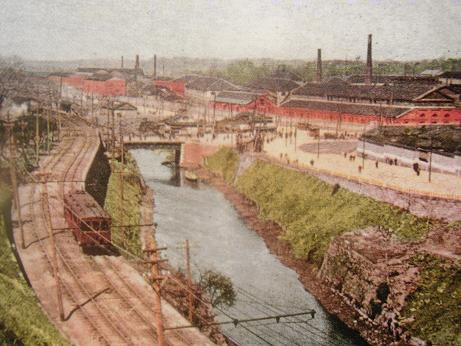
View of the red brick Koishikawa Arsenal from the direction of Suidobashi

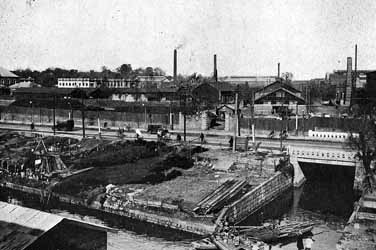
The new Koishikawa Arsenal, circa 1930.
